= BAR domain =

Group of highly conserved protein dimerisation domains

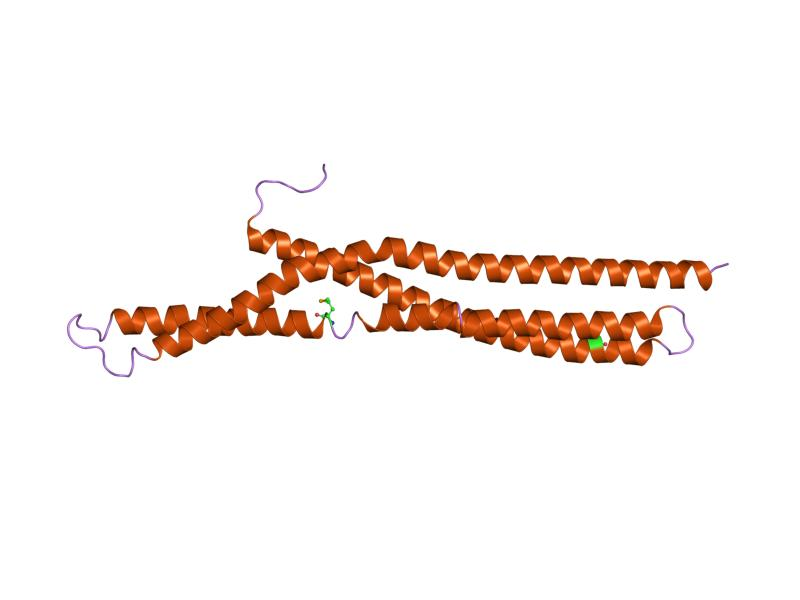
- Structure of amphiphysin BAR.

Identifiers
- Symbol: BAR
- Pfam: PF03114
- InterPro: IPR004148
- SMART: SM00721
- PROSITE: PDOC51021
- SCOP2: 1uru / SCOPe / SUPFAM
- CDD: cd07307
Available protein structures:
- PDB: IPR004148 PF03114 (ECOD; PDBsum)
- AlphaFold: IPR004148; PF03114

Bin/amphiphysin/Rvs domain

Identifiers
- Symbol: BAR-2
- Pfam: PF10455
Available protein structures:
- PDB: PF10455 (ECOD; PDBsum)
- AlphaFold: PF10455

BAR domain of APPL family

Identifiers
- Symbol: BAR-3
- Pfam: PF16746
Available protein structures:
- PDB: PF16746 (ECOD; PDBsum)
- AlphaFold: PF16746

EFC/F-BAR homology domain

Identifiers
- Symbol: FCH
- Pfam: PF00611
Available protein structures:
- PDB: PF00611 (ECOD; PDBsum)
- AlphaFold: PF00611

Vps5 C terminal like (BAR domain)

Identifiers
- Symbol: Vps5
- Pfam: PF09325
- InterPro: IPR015404
Available protein structures:
- PDB: IPR015404 PF09325 (ECOD; PDBsum)
- AlphaFold: IPR015404; PF09325

WASP-binding domain of sorting nexin proteins

Identifiers
- Symbol: BAR-3-WASP
- Pfam: PF10456
Available protein structures:
- PDB: PF10456 (ECOD; PDBsum)
- AlphaFold: PF10456

In molecular biology, BAR domains are highly conserved protein dimerisation domains that occur in many proteins involved in membrane dynamics in a cell. The BAR domain is banana-shaped and binds to membrane via its concave face. It is capable of sensing membrane curvature by binding preferentially to curved membranes. BAR domains are named after three proteins that they are found in: Bin, Amphiphysin and Rvs.

== Occurrence with other domains ==
Many BAR family proteins contain alternative lipid specificity domains that help target these protein to particular membrane compartments. Some also have SH3 domains that bind to dynamin and WASP family proteins and thus proteins like amphiphysin and endophilin are implicated in the orchestration of vesicle scission and actin cytoskeletal remodeling.

== N-BAR domain ==
Some BAR domain containing proteins have an N-terminal amphipathic helix preceding the BAR domain. This helix inserts (like in the epsin ENTH domain) into the membrane and induces curvature, which is stabilised by the BAR dimer. Amphiphysin, endophilin, BRAP1/bin2 and nadrin are examples of such proteins containing an N-BAR. The Drosophila amphiphysin N-BAR (DA-N-BAR) is an example of a protein with a preference for negatively charged surfaces.

== F-BAR (EFC) domain ==
Examples of the F-BAR domain family are CIP4/FBP17/Toca-1, Syndapins (also called PACSINs) and muniscins. or EFC for Extended FCH Homology) are BAR domains that are extensions of the already established FCH domain. They are frequently found at the amino terminus of proteins. They can bind lipid membranes and can tubulate lipids in vitro and in vivo, but their exact physiological role still is under investigation.

Gene knock-out of syndapin I in mice revealed that this brain-enriched isoform of the syndapin family is crucial for proper size control of synaptic vesicles and thereby indeed helps to define membrane curvature a physiological process. Work of the lab of Britta Qualmann also demonstrated that syndapin I is crucial for proper targeting of the large GTPase dynamin to membranes.

== Human proteins containing this domain ==
AMPH; ARHGAP17; ARHGAP44; BIN1; BIN2; BIN3; SH3BP1; SH3GL1; SH3GL2; SH3GL3; SH3GLB1; SH3GLB2.

The sorting nexin family of proteins includes several members that possess a BAR domain, including the well characterized SNX1 and SNX9.

== See also ==
- Arfaptin, includes a BAR-like domain
- I-BAR/IMD domain, a BAR-like domain with inverse curvature
- SNX8 - protein family with a combination of BAR-like and PX domains
- Epsin
- Membrane curvature
