= SNX8 =

Protein found in humans

Identifiers
- Aliases: SNX8, Mvp1, sorting nexin 8
- External IDs: OMIM: 614905; MGI: 2443816; GeneCards: SNX8

Gene location (Human)
Chr.	Chromosome 7 (human)
Band	7p22.3	Start	2,251,770 bp
Band	7p22.3	End	2,354,318 bp

Gene location (Mouse)
Chr.	Chromosome 5 (mouse)
Band	5|5 G2	Start	140,326,054 bp
Band	5|5 G2	End	140,375,017 bp
RNA expression pattern
Bgee	Human / Mouse (ortholog); Top expressed in: stromal cell of endometrium; left testis; right testis; spleen; gonad; appendix; lymph node; tendon of biceps brachii; gallbladder; prefrontal cortex / Top expressed in: yolk sac; epithelium of small intestine; stroma of bone marrow; calvaria; mesenteric lymph nodes; human kidney; right kidney; proximal tubule; superior cervical ganglion; spleen; More reference expression data
BioGPS	n/a
Gene ontology
Molecular function	lipid binding; protein binding; phosphatidylinositol binding; identical protein binding
Cellular component	retromer complex; endosome; early endosome membrane; intracellular membrane-bounded organelle; membrane; extrinsic component of membrane; cytosol
Biological process	early endosome to Golgi transport; protein transport; intracellular protein transport; endocytosis; vesicle organization; retrograde transport, endosome to Golgi
Sources:Amigo / QuickGO
Orthologs
Databases	NCBI: entry; OMA: entry
Species	Human	Mouse
Entrez	29886	231834
Ensembl	ENSG00000106266	ENSMUSG00000029560
UniProt	Q9Y5X2	Q8CFD4
RefSeq (mRNA)	NM_013321	NM_172277
RefSeq (protein)	NP_037453	NP_758481
Location (UCSC)	Chr 7: 2.25 – 2.35 Mb	Chr 5: 140.33 – 140.38 Mb
PubMed search
- Wikidata
View/Edit Human	View/Edit Mouse

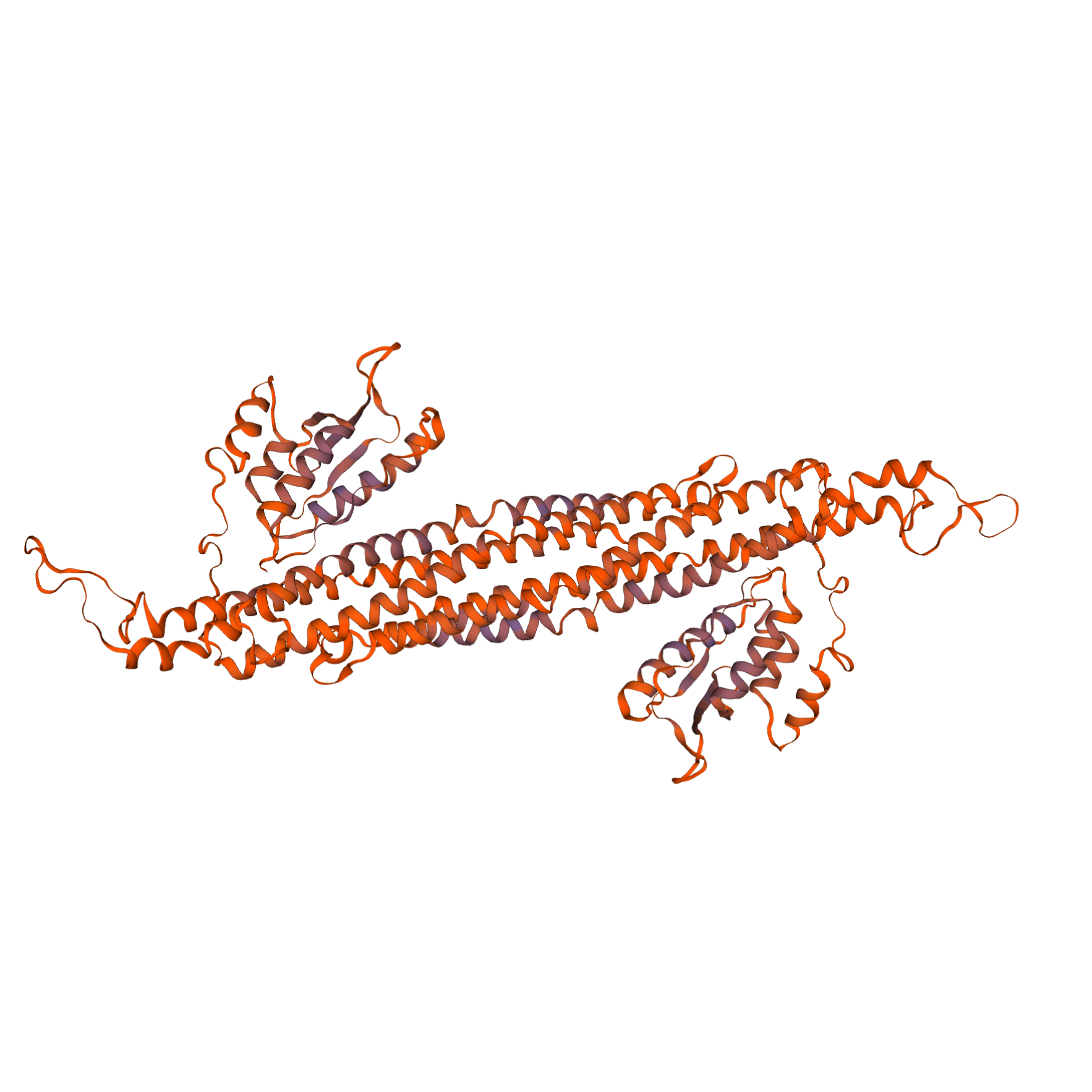
Tertiary structure of the SNX9 which gives an idea of the tertiary structure of the SNX8, since primary structure shares 20% sequence identity and 0.3 sequence similarity with SNX8 primary structure.

Sorting nexin-8 is a protein that in humans is encoded bu the SNX8 gene. SNX8 is a sorting nexin protein involved in intracellular protein trafficking from the early endosomes to the trans-golgi network. It is suggested that it acts as an adaptor protein in events related to immune response and cholesterol regulation, for example. As a protein of the SNXs family, the SNX8 is formed of 465 aminoacids and presents a BAR domain and a PX domain which are very relevant in relation to its functions. Furthermore, SNX8 study is motivated by its medical significance in relation to diseases such as Alzheimer's Disease, cancer, neurodevelopmental malformations and to its role in fighting against viral infections.

== Structure ==
=== Sorting nexins (snxs) ===
SNX8 belongs to the sorting nexin family of proteins, which mainly contain two functional membrane-binding that allow SNXs to have different roles in endosomal sorting and protein trafficking thanks to its membrane curvature ability. To begin with, SNX-PX is a distinct phosphoinositide (PI)-binding domain. The preferential interaction of this domain with membrane lipids makes the main function of SNX-PX the targeting of proteins to phosphatidylinositol-3-phosphate (PI(3)P) to endosomes. On the other hand, the BAR (Bin/amphiphysin/Rvs) domain is a key regulator of phosphoinositide-mediated, tubular-based endosomal sorting. Accordingly, this domain also dimerizes to sense, stabilize and induce membrane curvature. The SNX-BAR proteins that contain both domains are a part of phosphoinositide-enriched, high-curvature tubular micro-domains of the endo-lysosomal network.

The mammalian genome contains 12 genes coding for SNX-BAR proteins (SNX1, SNX2, SNX4, SNX9, SNX18, SNX32 and SNX33). Other domains, such as PDZ (postsynaptic density protein-95, discs-large, zona occludens-1), SH3 (Src homology 3) and RA (Ras-associated), are involved in protein-protein interactions.

=== SNX8 ===
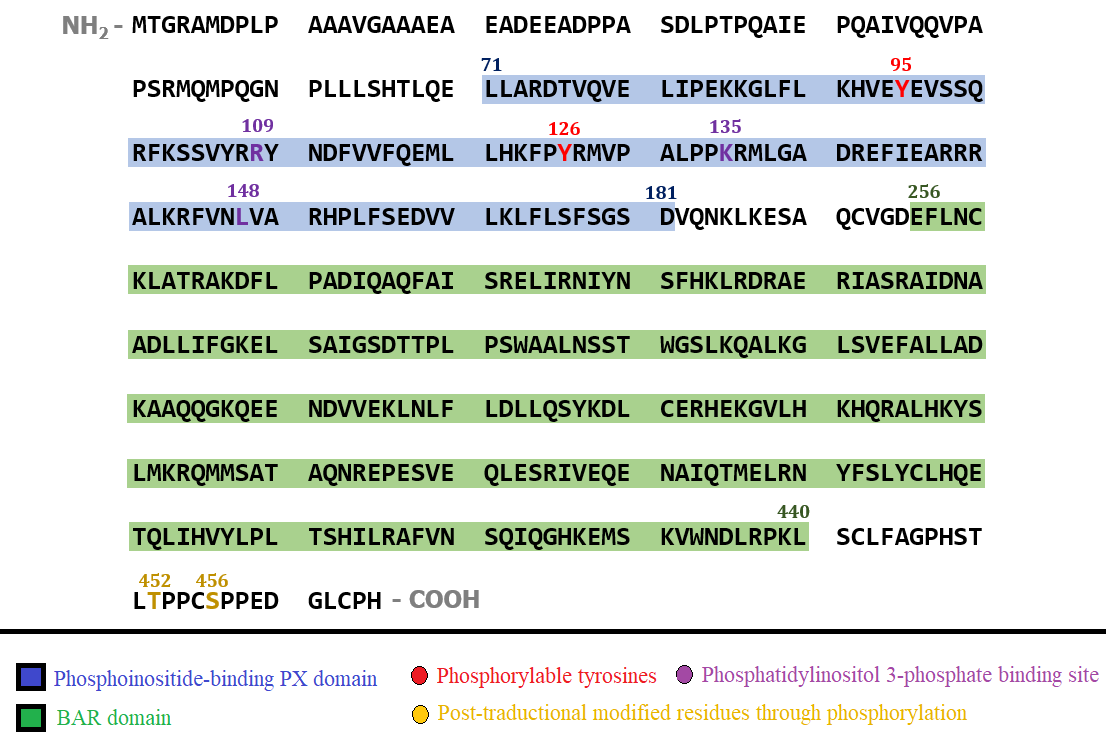
SNX8 primary structure highlighting relevant domains and amino acids.

The SNX8 protein, even though is very similar to the other sorting nexins, presents a domain structure which resembles the most to SNX1's and SNX9's; for this reason, although its terciary structure remains unknown, it theoretically resembles that of SNX9 shown in the model above. Overall, the SNX8 protein is integrated by one unique peptide chain that has 465 amino acids with a molecular mass of 52.569 Da.

==== PX domain-containing n-terminus ====
SNX8 contains a PX domain in its N-terminus, which is located between amino acids 71 and 181. A homology domain with yeast's PX domain is localized between amino acids 75 and 178 within this same domain. As it is a phosphoinositide-binding domain, it is important to highlight amino acids 109, 135 and 148 as residues directly related to phosphatidylinositol 3-phosphate since being specific binding sites, constituting a phosphoinositid binding site with a span of 40 amino acids. Furthermore, it includes a pair of phosphorylable tyrosines in positions 95 and 126 that are key in its function in the IFNγ-triggered IKKβ-mediated noncanonical signaling pathway. Overall, the PX domain main function is to target SNX8 mainly to early endosomes and other membranes rich in phosphatidylinositol 3-phosphate phospholipids.

==== BAR domain-containing c-terminus ====
SNX contains a BAR domain in its C-terminus, which is located between amino acids 256 and 440. Its ability to form coatings in membranes in order to induce their curvature is key in SNX8 participation in tubular structures formation. Furthermore, SNX8 C-terminus contains a threonine in position 452 and a serine in position 456 which can go through post-traductional changes that induces its phosphorylation, resulting in a phosphothreonine and a phosphoserine. Therefore, there are classified as phosphorylation sites.

==== MVP1 ortholog ====
SNX8 has a yeast ortholog protein, the MVP1 encoded by the also homolog gene Mvp1p, which also plays a role by mediating transport of cargo to the vacuolar and lysosomal compartments. For this reason, its investigation can lead to a better understanding of SNX8 functions in human cells.

== Biological functions and its molecular mechanisms ==
SNX8 is thought to be an adaptor protein involved in the endosome-to-Golgi transport pathway, participating in endocytosis and endosomal sorting and signaling. It downregulates retrograde transport of intracellular proteins from the early endosome compartment to the trans-Golgi network in a retromer-mediated manner. SNX8 is therefore localized in early endosomes, as its colocalization with components of the retromer such as SNX1, SNX2, Vps26 and Vps35 has been demonstrated by some studies (and also with EEA1). Furthermore, the dynamics of endosomal structures with SNX8-enriched membrane domains are regulated by the opposite motor proteins dynein-1 containing LIC1 and kinesin-1, both of which allow SNX8-mediated cargo movement through the cytosol by exerting forces on these structures. The biological functions of SNX8 that have been studied, all of which involve its role in intracellular endosomal transport, are explained in more detail in the following sections.

=== Innate immune response ===
==== Cytosolic RNA virus-triggered response ====
SNX8 is a key component in the induction of downstream effector antiviral gene transcription in response to RNA viruses, as it is necessary for RLR-mediated activation of the IFNβ promoter that leads to host defense in a dose-dependent manner. It positively regulates the aggregation and activation of VISA, a key adaptor protein involved in the innate immune response against this type of infections; this process is critical in the recruitment of other signaling components. Although SNX8's standard localization includes the cytoplasm and other compartments such as the ER, the ER-Golgi intermediate compartment, the Golgi apparatus or endosomes, it is partially localized at mitochondria. Furthermore, RNA viral infections cause the translocation of SNX8 from the cytosol to the mitochondria. During the early stage of the infection, SNX8 association with VISA increases above constitutive levels (degradation of VISA in later stages results in a reduction of this phenomenon). Structurally, the C-terminus transmembrane domain of VISA and both N-terminus PX domain and C-terminus of SNX8 are necessary for this linkage. The formation of the SNX8-VISA complex potentiates VISA prion-like polymerization and aggregation. After VISA activation, its accumulation allows the recruitment of signaling components which play a role in RLR-mediated antiviral response activation such as the intermediates of this pathway TBK1, IRF3, IκBα or ISRE. IRF3 cooperative activation with NF-κB transcription factor through phosphorylation leads to the induction of the IFNβ promoter transcription. Examples of genes whose RNA virus-triggered expression is stimulated by SNX8 are IFNB1, ISG56 and IL6 (being IL6 and IFNB1 related to cytokine secretion).

In addition, SNX8 also plays a role in RIG-I containing CARD domain-mediated and MDA5-mediated activation of the IFNβ promoter, since VISA works as an intermediate for both signaling pathways. The mechanism for SNX8 recruitment to VISA remains unclear, although two options have been suggested: translocation of viral RNA-bound RIG-I or MDA5 to VISA may result in a conformational switch that would increase its affinity for SNX8 or the RNA virus may induce post-translational modifications of one of these proteins allowing the translocation of SNX8 to mitochondria for its interaction with VISA.

==== Cytosolic DNA virus-triggered response ====
Simplified scheme of DNA-triggered SNX8-mediated association of MITA and VPS34, and its intracellular transport pathway from RE to perinuclear microsomes via Golgi apparatus.

SNX8 is a key component in the induction of downstream effector antiviral gene transcription in response to DNA viruses, as it is necessary for MITA-mediated activation of the IFNβ promoter in a dose-dependent manner. It regulates the activation of MITA, a central adaptor protein in the innate immune response to DNA viral infections that activates and onsets the antiviral response, by allowing its association with the class III phosphatylinositol 3 kinase VPS34-containing translocon machinery to form the MITA-Vps34 translocation complex; this linkage is crucial for MITA transport from the ER to perinuclear microsomal punctuate structures, which are induced by infection of viruses such as HSV-1, via Golgi mediated intracellular traffic. This MITA transport pathway is vital for the immune response to start. SNX8 is suggested to play a role in MITA's activation through this transport pathway, modulating its phosphorylation at serine in position 366 and recruiting the transcription factor IRF3 whose activation is important in the activation of the IFNβ promoter transcription. This hypothesis is supported by the fact that MITA, SNX8 and VPS34 colocalize in the cytoplasm, and that SNX8 localization in ER, ER-Golgi intermediate compartment, Golgi and endosomes is similar to that of MITA. Examples of genes whose DNA virus-triggered expression is stimulated by SNX8 are IFNB1, ISG56, CXCL10 and IL6 (being IFNB1 and IL6 related to cytokine secretion).

==== Ifnγ-triggered ikkβ-mediated noncanonical signaling pathway ====
SNX8 is a component of an IKKβ-mediated noncanonical signaling pathway triggered by the interferon gamma, which takes places parallelly to the more known IFNγ-induced JAK-STAT1 mediated pathway. Overall, it participates in a series of chemical reactions and molecular interactions that lead to the selective promotion of a particular subset of downstream effector gene transcription that encode IFNγ-induced GTPases of the GBP family, which participate in host defense against intracellular pathogens, and secretion proteins of the chemokine family such as CXCL9, CXCL10, and CXCL11 which present direct antimicrobial activity. In addition, SNX8 enhances the IFNγ-induced activation of the IRF1 promoter in a dose-dependent manner.

Simplified scheme of SNX8 participation in the IFNγ-triggered IKKβ-mediated noncanonical signaling pathway (autophosphorylation not shown).

Specifically, the steps of this pathway that are regulated by SNX8 are the following. The reception of IFNγ activates Janus kinase 1, resulting in the stimulation of its association with Sxn8 above standard constitutive levels. The link between these two protein within the JAK1-SNX8 complex allows JAK1 to catalyse SNX8's tyrosines phosphorylation in positions 95 and 126. This phosphorylation activates the JAK1-SNX, and the SNX8 acts as an adaptor or scaffolding protein by permitting the recruitment of the inhibitor of nuclear factor-kappa-B kinase subunit beta (IKKβ) to JAK1 in the JAK1-SNX8-IKKβ complex. This linkage is essential for IKKβ activation through autophosphorylation at serine in position 177 (as SNX8 lacks enzymatic activity) and further dimerization and oligomerization.

=== Cholesterol regulation ===
SNX8 protein regulates cholesterol levels as an activator of the SREBPs (Sterol Regulatory Element Binding Proteins), which is a family of transcription factors that control the expression of enzymes needed for the synthesis and uptake of fatty acids, endogenous cholesterol, triacylglycerides and phospholipids; this results in an overall regulation of intracellular lipid homeostasis. Although its precise mechanism of action remains unknown, data suggests that SNX8 produces changes in cholesterol distribution through regulation of the SREBP transcriptional activity by modulating intracellular traffic events rather than by interacting with proteins of the SREBP pathway like INSIG or SREBP cleavage-activating protein (SCAP). For example, it is unclear if SNX8 has a direct participation in the transport of SREBP pathway components or if it regulates endosomal and lysosomal compartmentalization through the production of cholesterol cargoes. This last possibility is supported by the fact that the ability of altering membrane curvature is shared by some proteins of the SNXs family.

It has been observed that variation in cholesterol levels alter SNX8 transcription: it remains unaltered in conditions of moderate high concentrations of cholesterol, and it experiments a decrease in conditions of restricted levels of cholesterol due to the action of the fungus-derived cholesterol-lowering statin mevinolin and the drug U18666a which promotes cytosolic cholesterol clustering within the endosomal and lysosomal compartments by acting as an intracellular cholesterol transport inhibitor. On the other hand, SNX8 overexpression induces intracellular clustering of cholesterol under conditions of high cellular cholesterol levels and aggravates abnormal distribution of cholesterol. In relation to the SREBP pathway, SNX8 is not able to successfully reduce the inhibitory impact of cholesterol on SREBP-mediated transcription, but it has an important effect that counteracts the block of this pathway triggered by the insulin-induced gene INSIG.

=== Intracellular non-amyloidogenic APP traffic ===
Simplified scheme of APP traffic and its amyloidogenic and non-amyloidogenic proteolytic degradative pathways

The amyloid precursor protein (APP) is consecutively transported from the ER after its synthesis to the plasma membrane via the trans-Golgi network; during this traffic, the neuroprotective soluble fragment sAPPα is produced as a product of APP cleavage by α-secretases. Lately, APP that reaches the membrane without being severed can be internalized into endosomes in order to be proteolytically processed through two parallel pathways: an amyloidogenic pathway via acidified late endosomes and a non-amyloidogenic or anti-myloidogenic retrograde pathway via Golgi apparatus. The amyloidogenic pathway leads to APP processing by γ-secretases and β-secretases such as BACE1, resulting in production of the neurotoxic amyloid beta (Aβ) peptide that accumulates in extracellular locations forming senile plaques.

SNX8 promotes non-amyloidogenic transport from the Golgi apparatus to other cellular locations, leading to an increase of APP levels, a stimulated distribution throughout the outer face of cell membrane, an enhanced sAPPα secretion and a reduced Aβ production (specifically, production of Aβ40 and Aβ42) . In addition, SNX8 improves APP stability, which is responsible for a longer lifespan, without having any effect in its mRNA transcription. This hypothesis is supported by the fact that SNX8 mainly colocalizes with Rab5 at early endosomes and partially with Rab4 at recycling endosomes, with Rab7 at late endosomes and with Giantin at Golgi apparatus.

=== Construction of tubular profiles ===
Although the endosomal compartment is composed of vesicular and tubular structures, it has been demonstrated that sorting involving recycling pathways is mainly tubule-mediated. Therefore, tubular structures building is essential for the activity of SNXs containing BAR domains (such as SNX1, SNX4 or SNX8) as phosphoinositide-mediated endosomal sorting proteins. This BAR domain allows them to assembly in a dose-dependent manner a helical coat with the capacity to detect, promote and stabilize the curvature of endosomal vesicular membranes into tubular profiles during the so-called incidence detection process, specially in phosphoinosited-enriched regions where they are localized thanks to the affinity of the PX domain for these membrane phospholipids. In particular, SNX8 colocalizes with Rab5 at early endosomes membranes and at the tubular endosomal network (TEN) around the endosomal vacuole, which is an important compartment for successful sorting of cargoes.

It is also worth mentioning the existing coupling of tubular structures formation and the maduration processes from early endosomes to late endosomes, which is mainly characterized by a retrograde movement from the cell periphery to a juxtanuclear position, an acidification of early endosomes lumen and a switch from Rab5 GTPase to Rab7 GTPase. The construction of these tubules, which is important for SNX-mediated endosomal sorting, experiments an important acceleration during this transition process; therefore, it is suggested that SNX8 may be involved in the transport of endogenous acid environment-requiring cargo. In addition, as SNX8 interacts with elements of the retromer, it is important to highlight the role of both subcomplexes of the retromer in the coordinated relationship between endosomal maturation and the generation of tubular profiles from vesicular structures.

== Medical and clinical significance ==
=== Alzheimer's disease ===
Insoluble accumulations of β-amyloid peptide in brain regions related to memory and cognition are a defining characteristic of Alzheimer's disease (AD). SNX8 has a neuroprotective role related to AD: it enhances the non-amyloidogenic APP pathway and, hence, reduces the Aβ plaques and deposit accumulations and suppresses cognitive impairment caused by AD. Some studies found that SNX8 levels were drastically lower in patients with AD. Furthermore, it has been demonstrated that SNX8 overexpression mediated by adeno-associated virus (AVV) reduced Aβ levels and reversed cognitive impairment in AD mice. It is also important mentioning that a pair of polymorphisms (rs2286206 and rs10249052) within the human SNX8 gene locus have also been associated with late-onset AD.

=== Neurodevelopmental disorders ===
Several case studies studying deletions in the 7p22.3 genomic region, where the SNX8 gene is located, found that it contributes to neurodevelopmental problems with considerable impairments in the motor, cognitive and socio-emotional areas, with malformations in the heart and craniofacial structures, with developmental, intellectual and language delay, with mild intellectual disability and with cognitive impairment associated with autism in some cases. This idea is supported by the fact that the overlapping deleted regions of the different patients of these studies contained SNX8, which suggests that it is one of the accountable genes.

=== Antiviral activity ===
SNX8 plays an antiviral role against Listeria monocytogenes through the IFNγ-triggered IKKβ-mediated noncanonical signaling pathway; murine cells expressing SNX8 under this infection showed a higher expression and secretion of IFNβ and IL6 cytokines in blood and lower presence of bacteria in liver and spleens, which resulted in a reduction of Listeria monocytogenes lethality, in comparison to SNX8-negative induced murine cells.

In addition, SNX8 plays an antiviral role against DNA viruses such as HSV-1 through the MITA-mediated activation of the IFNβ promoter; murine cells expressing SNX8 under this infection showed a higher expression and secretion of IFNβ and IL6 cytokines in blood and a decreased presence of cerebral viral titers, which resulted in a reduction of HSV-1 lethality, in comparison to SNX8-negative induced murine cells.

Finally, SNX8 also plays an antiviral role against RNA viruses such as SeV (Sendai virus) through VISA-mediated activation of the IFNβ promoter; murine cells expressing SNX8 under this infection showed a higher expression and secretion of IFNβ and IL6 cytokines in blood and a reduced presence of viral accumulations, which resulted in a reduction of SeV lethality, in comparison to SNX8-negative induced murine cells.

=== Cardiac malformations ===
It is suggested that SNX8 participates in the development of the embryonic cardiac tissue since the gene is expressed with cells within the area of heart. This hypothesis is supported by the fact that SNX8 activity has been associated to sortin nexin L, a protein of the same family encoded by the SNX21 gene, which plays a role in the development of the embryonic liver. Deletions of chromosome 7p22 that induce happloinsufficiency of SNX8 among other genes (FTSJ2, NUDTI and MAD1L1) seem to cause craniosynostosis, dysmorphic features and cardiac malformations encompassing tetralogy of Fallot, one of the most common cyanotic congenital heart defects. Nevertheless, evidence demonstrates the existence of patients with SNX8 deletion whose cardiac tissue development does not experience any alteration. Finally, although cardiac malformation requires SNX8 haploinsufficiency, its deletion is not enough to cause this malformations on its own.

==== Relationship between cardiac malformations and cholesterol regulation ====
This bar plot shows the proportion of tumor samples from 15 cancer types that have any kind of altering mutation(s) in the given protein.

SNX8 role in cholesterol levels regulation is markedly relevant since disruption of intracellular cholesterol metabolism and trafficking is the main cause of multiple human disorders. For example, some studies suggest that SNX8 deletions might produce cardiac malformations since its function in normal cholesterol levels regulations would be completely impaired.

=== Neuropathic pain ===
SNPs (single nucleotide polymorphisms) in the SNX8 gene are related to neuropathy due to its role in endosomal content sorting. Neuropathic pain is a chronic debilitating pain condition caused by a nervous system lesion or dysfunction, which usually emerges after head and neck cancer treatment. This hypothesis is supported by the fact that other SNXs activity has also been identified with other pain conditions.

=== Cancer ===
Some mutations of SNX8 have been related to certain types of cancer, specially to stomach and endometrial cancer. The bar plot on the right shows the proportion of tumor samples from 15 cancer types that have any kind of altering mutations in the given protein. Moreover, some studies seem to draw an important relationship between different type of cancers and SNX8 expression; although most of the patients with colorectal, stomach or testis cancer showed high levels of SNX8, almost any patient with prostate, endometrial or carcinoid cancer presented low or any concentrations of SNX8. The rationale behind this differential phenotype of SNX8 synthesis remains unclear.
