= Sorting nexin =

PX domain
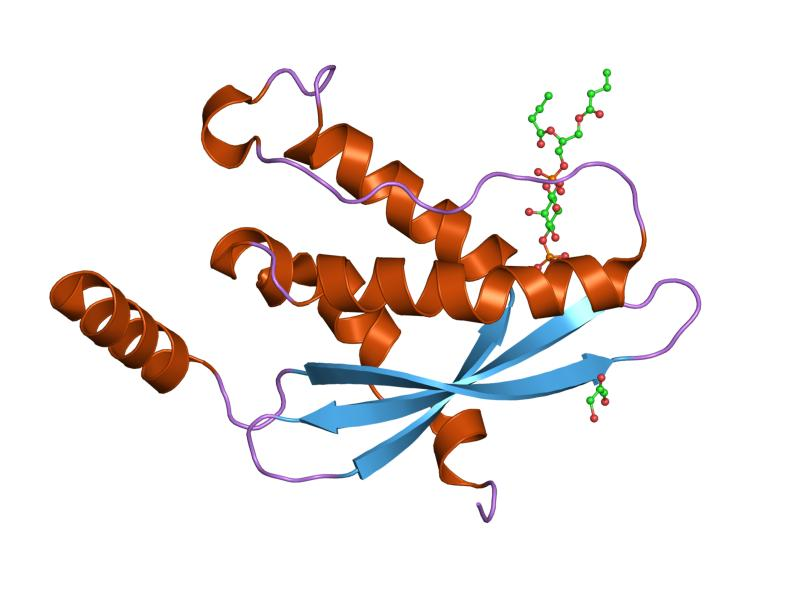
- Structure of the PX domain from p40(phox) bound to phosphatidylinositol 3-phosphate.

Identifiers
- Symbol: PX
- Pfam: PF00787
- InterPro: IPR001683
- SMART: PX
- PROSITE: PDOC50195
- SCOP2: 1h6h / SCOPe / SUPFAM
- OPM superfamily: 57
- OPM protein: 4on3
Available protein structures:
- Pfam: structures / ECOD
- PDB: RCSB PDB; PDBe; PDBj
- PDBsum: structure summary

Sorting nexin, N-terminal domain

Identifiers
- Symbol: Sorting_nexin
- Pfam: PF03700
- InterPro: IPR005329
Available protein structures:
- Pfam: structures / ECOD
- PDB: RCSB PDB; PDBe; PDBj
- PDBsum: structure summary

Vps5 C terminal like (BAR domain)

Identifiers
- Symbol: Vps5
- Pfam: PF09325
- InterPro: IPR015404
Available protein structures:
- Pfam: structures / ECOD
- PDB: RCSB PDB; PDBe; PDBj
- PDBsum: structure summary

Sorting nexin, C terminal domain

Identifiers
- Symbol: Nexin_C
- Pfam: PF08628
- InterPro: IPR013937
Available protein structures:
- Pfam: structures / ECOD
- PDB: RCSB PDB; PDBe; PDBj
- PDBsum: structure summary

WASP-binding domain of Sorting nexin protein

Identifiers
- Symbol: BAR3-WASP
- Pfam: PF10456
Available protein structures:
- Pfam: structures / ECOD
- PDB: RCSB PDB; PDBe; PDBj
- PDBsum: structure summary

Sorting nexins are a large group of proteins that are localized in the cytoplasm and have the potential for membrane association either through their lipid-binding PX domain (a phospholipid-binding motif) or through protein–protein interactions with membrane-associated protein complexes Some members of this family have been shown to facilitate protein sorting.

== Family members ==
In humans, sorting nexins are transcribed from the following genes:

Genes	Domain Composition				
Genes	N-terminus	Mid-1	Mid-2	Mid-3	C-terminus
SNX1, SNX2	Sorting_nexin_N	–	PX	–	BAR (Vps5)
SNX4, SNX7, SNX8, SNX30	–	–	PX	–	BAR (Vsp5)
SNX5, SNX6, SNX32	–	–	PX	–	BAR
SNX9, SNX18, SNX33	SH3	–	PX	–	BAR (BAR_3_WASP_bdg)
SNX13, SNX14, SNX19, SNX25	PXA	RGS	PX	–	Nexin_C
SNX15	–	–	PX	–	MIT
SNX17, SNX31	–	–	PX	RA	FERM_M
SNX23	kinesin_motor	SMAD_FHA	PX	–	–
SNX26	–	–	PX	SH3	RhoGAP
SNX27	PDZ	–	PX	-	FERM_M
SNX28	–	–	PX	SH3	SH3
SNX3, SNX10, SNX11, SNX12, SNX16, SNX20, SNX21, SNX22, SNX24, SNX29	–	–	PX	–	–

== Structure ==
Sorting nexins either consist solely of a PX domain (e.g. SNX3) or have a modular structure made up of the PX and additional domains.

A subgroup of sorting nexins (comprising, in humans, SNX1, SNX2, SNX4, SNX5, SNX6, SNX7, SNX8, SNX9, SNX18, SNX30, SNX32 and SNX33) possess a BAR domain at their C-terminus. (The BAR domain of SNXs 1, 2, 4, 7, 8 and 30 is classified by pfam as 'Vps5 C terminal like'.)

An example of a sorting nexin domain structure can be seen here for SNX1:

1. NTD – N-terminal domain
2. PX domain
3. CTD – C-terminal BAR domain

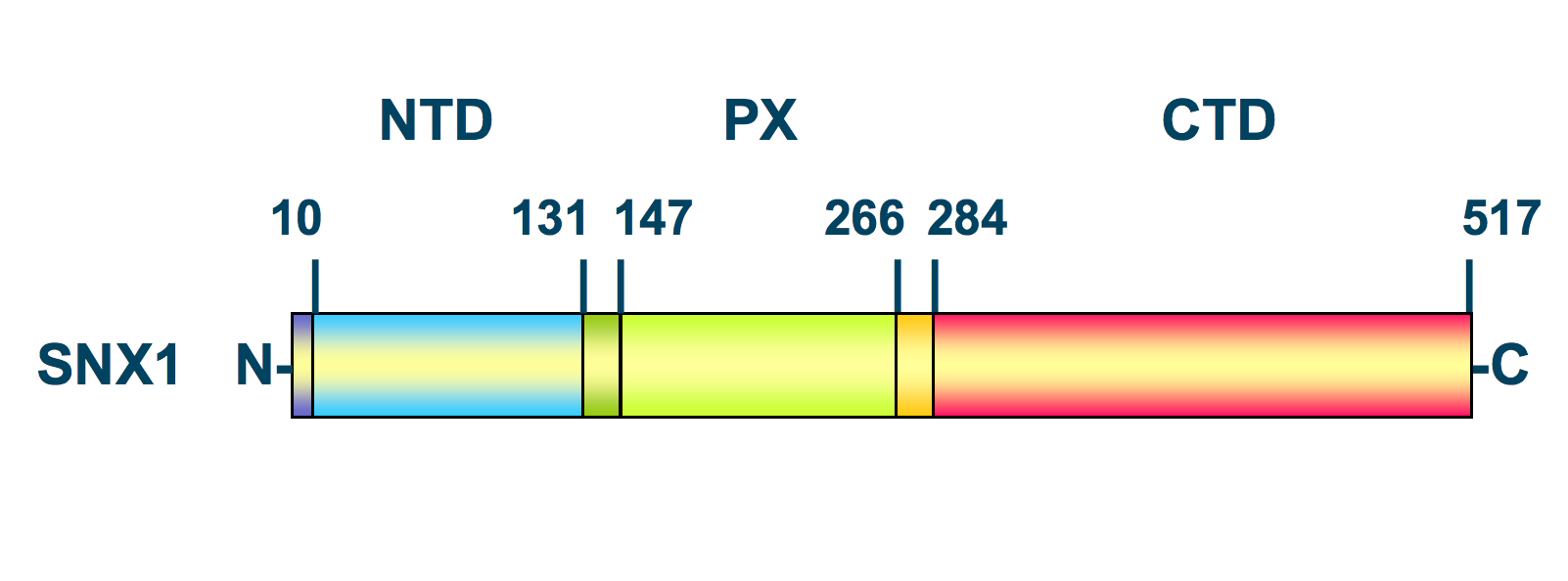
Schematic diagram of the 1D structures of a representative sorting nexin, the sorting nexin 1 (SNX1). NTD = N-terminal SNX domain, PX = PX domain, CTD = C-terminal BAR domain.
