= SNX2 =

Protein-coding gene in the species Homo sapiens

Identifiers
- Aliases: SNX2, TRG-9, sorting nexin 2
- External IDs: OMIM: 605929; MGI: 1915054; GeneCards: SNX2

Gene location (Human)
Chr.	Chromosome 5 (human)
Band	5q23.2	Start	122,775,079 bp
Band	5q23.2	End	122,834,543 bp

Gene location (Mouse)
Chr.	Chromosome 18 (mouse)
Band	18|18 D1	Start	53,309,388 bp
Band	18|18 D1	End	53,353,937 bp
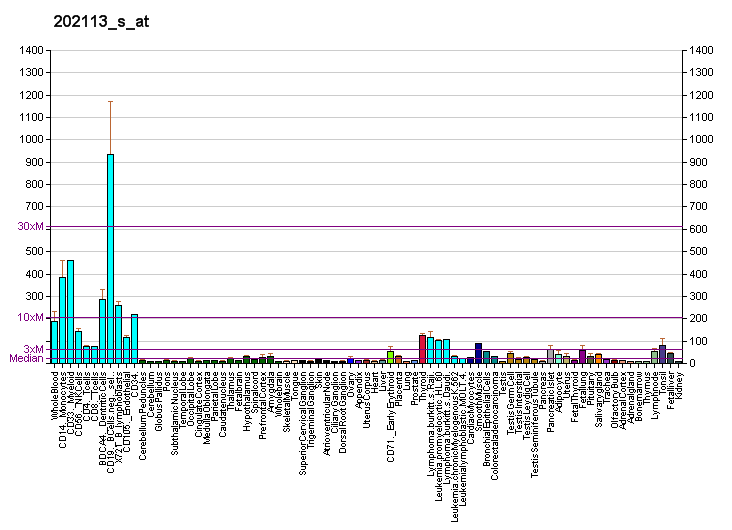

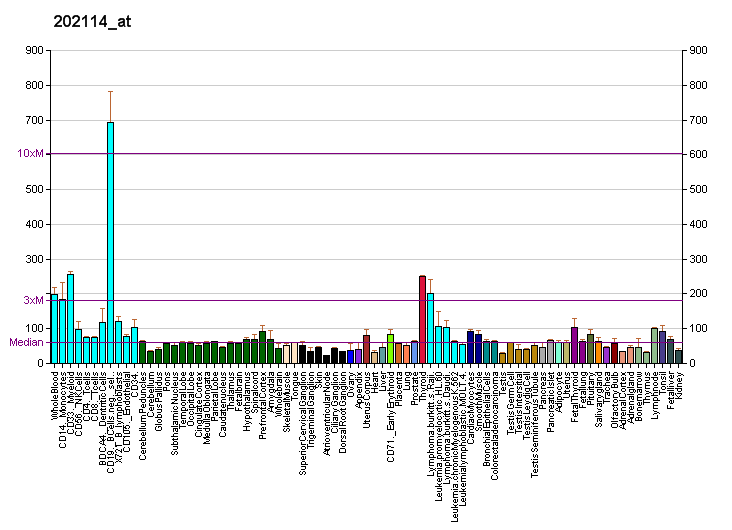
RNA expression pattern
Bgee	Human / Mouse (ortholog); Top expressed in: monocyte; Achilles tendon; islet of Langerhans; ventricular zone; gallbladder; rectum; ganglionic eminence; Descending thoracic aorta; popliteal artery; tibial arteries / Top expressed in: blastocyst; yolk sac; spleen; sciatic nerve; placenta; morula; morula; olfactory epithelium; uterus; stomach; More reference expression data
BioGPS	More reference expression data
Gene ontology
Molecular function	protein homodimerization activity; insulin receptor binding; leptin receptor binding; epidermal growth factor receptor binding; protein binding; phosphatidylinositol binding; protein heterodimerization activity; transferrin receptor binding; lipid binding; cadherin binding
Cellular component	cytoplasm; cell projection; early endosome membrane; membrane; retromer, tubulation complex; retromer complex; endosome membrane; lamellipodium; extrinsic component of membrane; cytosol; lysosome; endosome; protein-containing complex
Biological process	endocytosis; vesicle organization; early endosome to Golgi transport; retrograde transport, endosome to Golgi; protein complex oligomerization; protein transport; intracellular protein transport; lamellipodium morphogenesis
Sources:Amigo / QuickGO
Orthologs
Databases	NCBI: entry; OMA: entry
Species	Human	Mouse
Entrez	6643	67804
Ensembl	ENSG00000205302	ENSMUSG00000034484
UniProt	O60749	Q9CWK8
RefSeq (mRNA)	NM_003100; NM_001278199	NM_026386; NM_001357463
RefSeq (protein)	NP_001265128; NP_003091	NP_080662; NP_001344392
Location (UCSC)	Chr 5: 122.78 – 122.83 Mb	Chr 18: 53.31 – 53.35 Mb
PubMed search
- Wikidata
View/Edit Human	View/Edit Mouse

Sorting nexin-2 is a protein that in humans is encoded by the SNX2 gene.

== Function ==
This gene encodes a member of the sorting nexin family. Members of this family contain a phox (PX) domain, which is a phosphoinositide binding domain, and are involved in intracellular trafficking. This protein associates with formin-binding protein 17, but its function is unknown. This protein may form oligomeric complexes with family members.

== Interactions ==
SNX2 has been shown to interact with FNBP1.
