= FNBP1 =

Protein-coding gene in the species Homo sapiens

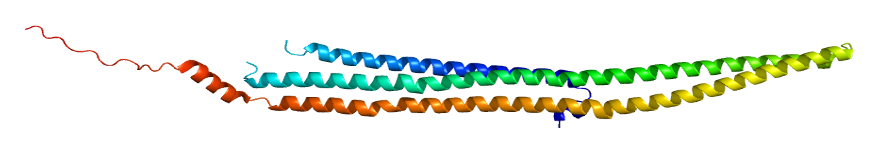

Identifiers
- Aliases: FNBP1, FBP17, formin binding protein 1
- External IDs: OMIM: 606191; MGI: 109606; GeneCards: FNBP1
Available structures
| PDB | Ortholog search: PDBe RCSB |
| PDB | List of PDB id codes 2EFL |

Gene location (Human)
| Chr. | Chromosome 9 (human) |
| Band | 9q34.11 | Start | 129,887,187 bp |
| Band | 9q34.11 | End | 130,043,194 bp |

Gene location (Mouse)
| Chr. | Chromosome 2 (mouse) |
| Band | 2|2 B | Start | 30,916,218 bp |
| Band | 2|2 B | End | 31,032,020 bp |
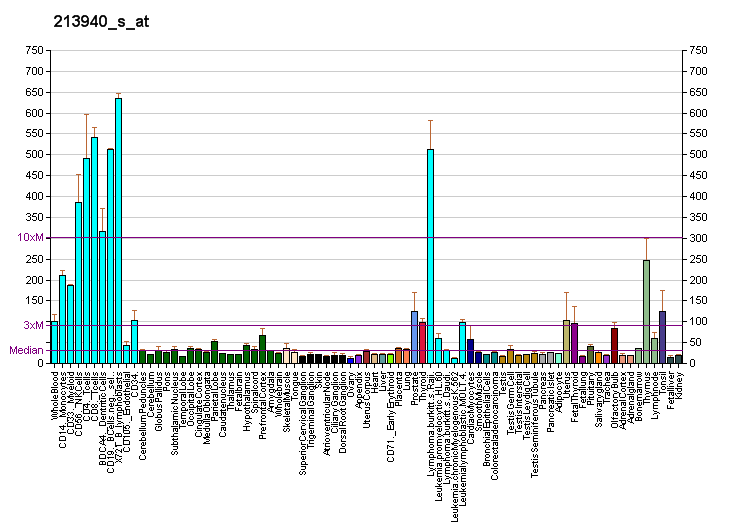

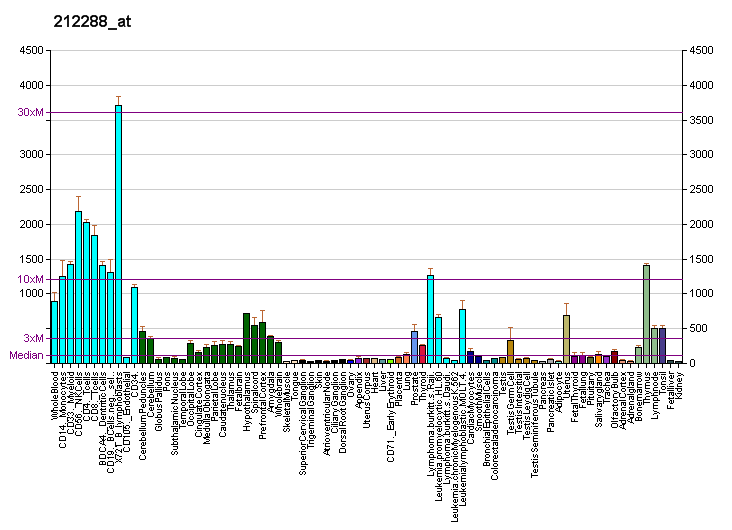
RNA expression pattern
| Bgee | Human / Mouse (ortholog); Top expressed in: corpus callosum; gastric mucosa; cerebellar hemisphere; saphenous vein; right hemisphere of cerebellum; inferior ganglion of vagus nerve; paraflocculus of cerebellum; thymus; epithelium of colon; sural nerve / Top expressed in: cerebellar cortex; cerebellar vermis; lobe of cerebellum; pontine nuclei; deep cerebellar nuclei; ventral tegmental area; medial geniculate nucleus; lateral geniculate nucleus; medial dorsal nucleus; globus pallidus; More reference expression data |
| BioGPS | More reference expression data |
Gene ontology
| Molecular function | protein binding; identical protein binding; lipid binding |
| Cellular component | cytoplasm; plasma membrane; clathrin-coated pit; lysosome; cell cortex; cytoskeleton; membrane; cytoplasmic vesicle; cytosol |
| Biological process | endocytosis; membrane organization |
Sources:Amigo / QuickGO
Orthologs
| Databases | NCBI: entry; OMA: entry |
| Species | Human | Mouse |
| Entrez | 23048 | 14269 |
| Ensembl | ENSG00000187239 | ENSMUSG00000075415 |
| UniProt | Q96RU3 | Q80TY0 |
| RefSeq (mRNA) | NM_015033; NM_001363755 | NM_001038700; NM_001177648; NM_001177649; NM_001177650; NM_019406 NM_001355105; NM_001355106 |
| RefSeq (protein) | NP_055848; NP_001350684 | NP_001033789; NP_001171119; NP_001171120; NP_001171121; NP_062279 NP_001342034; NP_001342035 |
| Location (UCSC) | Chr 9: 129.89 – 130.04 Mb | Chr 2: 30.92 – 31.03 Mb |
| PubMed search |
- Wikidata
| View/Edit Human | View/Edit Mouse |

Formin-binding protein 1 is a protein that in humans is encoded by the FNBP1 gene.

== Function ==
The protein encoded by this gene is a member of the formin-binding-protein family. The protein contains an N-terminal Fer/Cdc42-interacting protein 4 (CIP4) homology (FCH) domain followed by a coiled-coil domain, a proline-rich motif, a second coiled-coil domain, a Rho family protein-binding domain (RBD), and a C-terminal SH3 domain. This protein binds sorting nexin 2 (SNX2), tankyrase (TNKS), and dynamin; an interaction between this protein and formin has not been demonstrated yet in human.

== Interactions ==
FNBP1 has been shown to interact with:

- AKAP9,
- DNM1,
- Fas ligand
- SNX2, and
- TNKS.
