= PXK =

Identifiers
- Aliases: PXK, MONaKA, PX domain containing serine/threonine kinase like
- External IDs: OMIM: 611450; MGI: 1289230; GeneCards: PXK

Gene location (Mouse)
Chr.	Chromosome 14 (mouse)
Band	14 A1|14 4.7 cM	Start	14,304,656 bp
Band	14 A1|14 4.7 cM	End	14,371,562 bp
Gene ontology
Molecular function	nucleotide binding; actin binding; protein kinase activity; phosphatidylinositol binding; ATP binding; protein C-terminus binding
Cellular component	cytoplasm; membrane; nucleus; microtubule organizing center; cytosol; plasma membrane; protein-containing complex
Biological process	protein phosphorylation; inflammatory response; negative regulation of ATP-dependent activity; negative regulation of ion transport; modulation of chemical synaptic transmission; regulation of membrane potential
Sources:Amigo / QuickGO
Orthologs
Databases	NCBI: entry; OMA: entry
Species	Human	Mouse
Entrez	54899	218699
Ensembl	ENSG00000168297	ENSMUSG00000033885
UniProt	Q7Z7A4	Q8BX57
RefSeq (mRNA)	NM_001289095; NM_001289096; NM_001289098; NM_001289099; NM_001289100 NM_001289101; NM_017771	NM_145458; NM_178279; NM_001360313; NM_001360314; NM_001360315 NM_001360316
RefSeq (protein)	NP_001276024; NP_001276025; NP_001276027; NP_001276028; NP_001276029 NP_001276030; NP_060241; NP_001336417; NP_001336418; NP_001336419; NP_001336420; NP_001336421; NP_001336422; NP_001336423; NP_001336424; NP_001336425; NP_001336426; NP_001336427; NP_001336428; NP_001336429; NP_001336430; NP_001336431; NP_001336432; NP_001336433; NP_001336435; NP_001336436; NP_001336437; NP_001336438; NP_001336439; NP_001336440; NP_001336441; NP_001336442; NP_001336443; NP_001336444; NP_001336445; NP_001336446; NP_001336447; NP_001336448; NP_001336449; NP_001336450; NP_001336451; NP_001336453; NP_001336454; NP_001336455; NP_001336456; NP_001336457; NP_001336458; NP_001336459; NP_001336460; NP_001336461; NP_001336462; NP_001336463; NP_001336464; NP_001336465; NP_001336466; NP_001336467; NP_001336468; NP_001336469	NP_663433; NP_840063; NP_001347242; NP_001347243; NP_001347244 NP_001347245
Location (UCSC)	n/a	Chr 14: 14.3 – 14.37 Mb
PubMed search
- Wikidata
View/Edit Human	View/Edit Mouse

PX domain containing serine/threonine kinase also known as PXK is a protein which in humans is encoded by the PXK gene.

== Function ==
PXK binds to the Na⁺/K⁺-ATPase beta-1 (ATP1B1) and beta-3 (ATP1B3) subunits and modulates both Na⁺/K⁺-ATPase enzymatic and ion pump activities.

== See also ==
- PX domain
