= Bridging integrator 3 =

Protein-coding gene in the species Homo sapiens

BIN3

Identifiers
- Aliases: BIN3, bridging integrator 3
- External IDs: OMIM: 606396; MGI: 1929883; GeneCards: BIN3

Gene location (Human)
Chr.	Chromosome 8 (human)
Band	8p21.3	Start	22,620,418 bp
Band	8p21.3	End	22,669,148 bp

Gene location (Mouse)
Chr.	Chromosome 14 (mouse)
Band	14|14 D2	Start	70,337,554 bp
Band	14|14 D2	End	70,375,655 bp
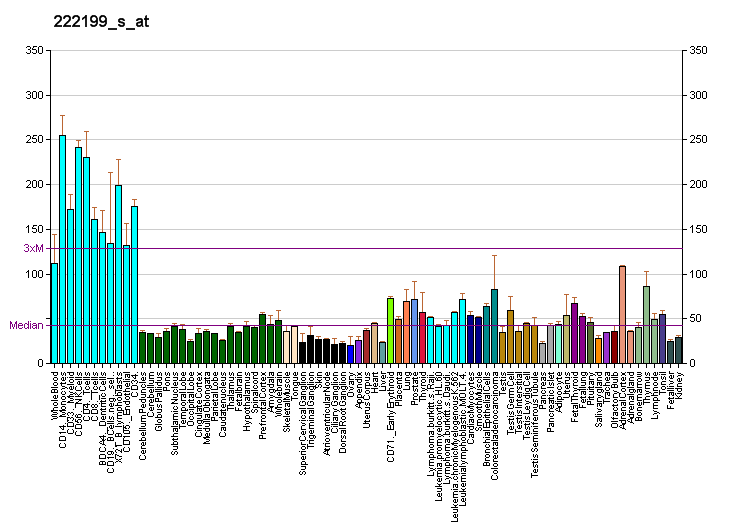
RNA expression pattern
Bgee	Human / Mouse (ortholog); Top expressed in: sural nerve; right adrenal cortex; left adrenal gland; left adrenal cortex; oocyte; blood; right uterine tube; olfactory zone of nasal mucosa; granulocyte; stromal cell of endometrium / Top expressed in: granulocyte; fetal liver hematopoietic progenitor cell; spermatocyte; tibiofemoral joint; zygote; secondary oocyte; mesenteric lymph nodes; blood; stroma of bone marrow; skin of external ear; More reference expression data
BioGPS	More reference expression data
Gene ontology
Molecular function	cytoskeletal anchor activity; protein binding; cytoskeletal protein binding; lipid binding
Cellular component	cytoplasm; cytoskeleton; actin filament; actin cortical patch
Biological process	regulation of lamellipodium assembly; unidimensional cell growth; protein localization; division septum assembly; cell cycle; myoblast migration involved in skeletal muscle regeneration; skeletal muscle fiber development; skeletal muscle tissue regeneration; actin filament organization; cell division; cytoskeleton-dependent cytokinesis; endocytosis; actin cortical patch localization; plasma membrane tubulation
Sources:Amigo / QuickGO
Orthologs
Databases	NCBI: entry; OMA: entry
Species	Human	Mouse
Entrez	55909	57784
Ensembl	ENSG00000147439	ENSMUSG00000022089
UniProt	Q9NQY0	Q9JI08
RefSeq (mRNA)	NM_018688; NM_001363046	NM_021328; NM_001360404
RefSeq (protein)	NP_061158; NP_001349975	NP_067303; NP_001347333
Location (UCSC)	Chr 8: 22.62 – 22.67 Mb	Chr 14: 70.34 – 70.38 Mb
PubMed search
- Wikidata
View/Edit Human	View/Edit Mouse

Bridging integrator 3 is a protein. In humans it is encoded by the BIN3 gene.

== Function ==
The product of this gene is a member of the BAR domain protein family. The encoded protein is composed solely of a BAR domain which is predicted to form coiled coil structures and is proposed to mediate dimerization, sense and induce membrane curvature, and bind small GTPases. BAR domain proteins have been implicated in endocytosis, intracellular transport, and a diverse set of other processes.
