= PX domain =

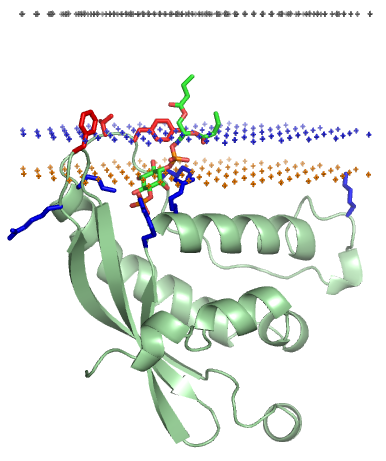
- PX domain of NADH oxidase (p40phox), lipid-bound

Identifiers
- Symbol: PX
- Pfam: PF00787
- InterPro: IPR001683
- SMART: PX
- PROSITE: PDOC50195
- SCOP2: 1h6h / SCOPe / SUPFAM
- OPM superfamily: 57
- OPM protein: 1xte
- CDD: cd06093
Available protein structures:
- Pfam: structures / ECOD
- PDB: RCSB PDB; PDBe; PDBj
- PDBsum: structure summary

The PX domain is a phosphoinositide-binding structural domain involved in targeting of proteins to cell membranes.

This domain was first found in P40phox and p47phox domains of NADPH oxidase (phox stands for phagocytic oxidase). It was also identified in many other proteins involved in membrane trafficking, including nexins, Phospholipase D, and phosphoinositide-3-kinases.

The PX domain is structurally conserved in eukaryotes, although amino acid sequences show little similarity. PX domains interact primarily with PtdIns(3)P lipids. However some of them bind to phosphatidic acid, PtdIns(3,4)P2, PtdIns(3,5)P2, PtdIns(4,5)P2, and PtdIns(3,4,5)P3. The PX-domain can also interact with other domains and proteins.

== Human proteins containing this domain ==
The human genome encodes about 40 PX-domain proteins, including multiple sorting nexins. Other examples include:

- HS1BP3
- KIF16B (SNX23)
- NCF1; NCF1C; NCF4; NISCH
- PIK3C2A; PIK3C2B; PIK3C2G; PLD1; PLD2; PXK
- RPS6KC1
- SGK3; SH3PXD2A; SNAG1; SNX9
