= DNM1 =

Protein-coding gene in the species Homo sapiens

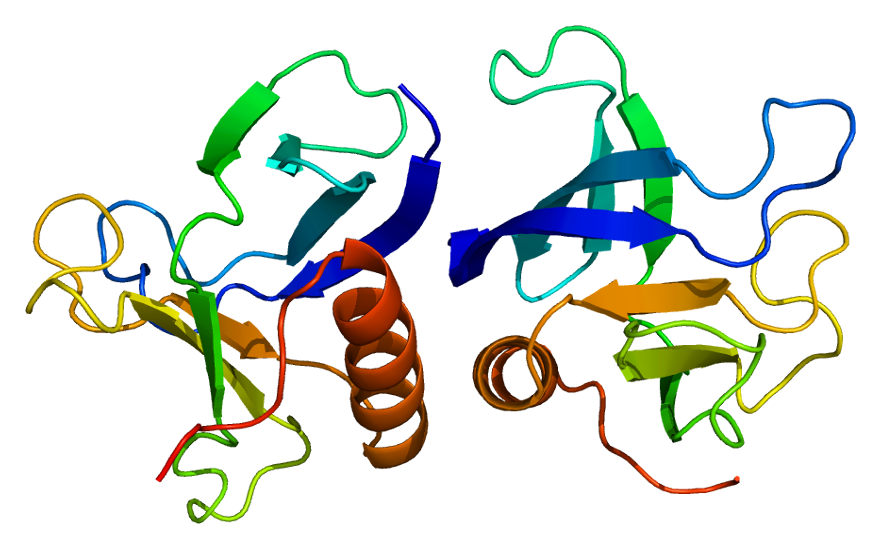

Identifiers
- Aliases: DNM1, Dynamin-1, DNM, EIEE31, dynamin 1, DEE31
- External IDs: OMIM: 602377; MGI: 107384; GeneCards: DNM1
Available structures
PDB	Ortholog search: PDBe RCSB
PDB	List of PDB id codes 1DYN, 2DYN, 2X2E, 2X2F, 3SNH, 3ZYC, 3ZYS, 4UUD, 4UUK, 5D3Q
Enzyme activity
EC #	BRENDA	ExPASy	KEGG	MetaCyc
3.6.5.5	↗	↗	↗	↗

Gene location (Human)
Chr.	Chromosome 9 (human)
Band	9q34.11	Start	128,191,655 bp
Band	9q34.11	End	128,255,248 bp

Gene location (Mouse)
Chr.	Chromosome 2 (mouse)
Band	2 B|2 22.09 cM	Start	32,198,483 bp
Band	2 B|2 22.09 cM	End	32,243,350 bp
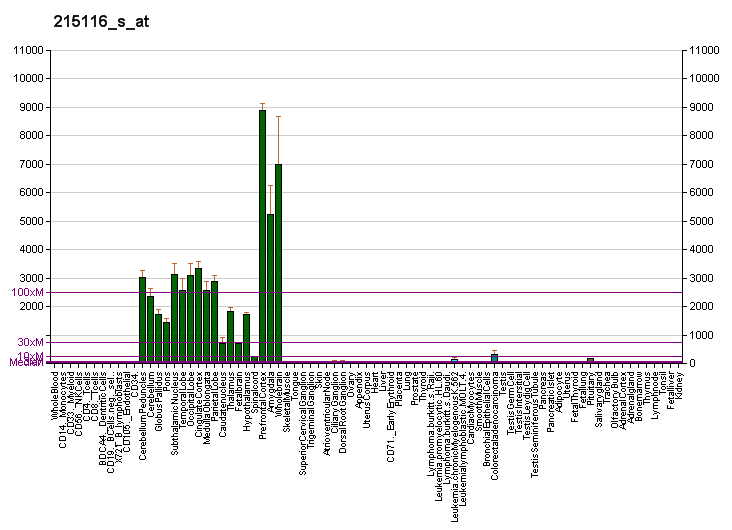
RNA expression pattern
Bgee	Human / Mouse (ortholog); Top expressed in: right hemisphere of cerebellum; Brodmann area 10; middle temporal gyrus; superior frontal gyrus; right frontal lobe; frontal pole; paraflocculus of cerebellum; parietal lobe; Brodmann area 46; postcentral gyrus / Top expressed in: CA3 field; entorhinal cortex; perirhinal cortex; dentate gyrus of hippocampal formation granule cell; superior frontal gyrus; cingulate gyrus; cerebellar cortex; central gray substance of midbrain; pontine nuclei; prefrontal cortex; More reference expression data
BioGPS	More reference expression data
Gene ontology
Molecular function	nucleotide binding; protein dimerization activity; GTP binding; protein binding; hydrolase activity; protein kinase binding; microtubule binding; RNA binding; GTPase activity; protein C-terminus binding; D2 dopamine receptor binding; protein-containing complex binding; nitric-oxide synthase binding; identical protein binding; SH3 domain binding
Cellular component	cytoplasm; photoreceptor inner segment; myelin sheath; synapse; membrane coat; microtubule; cytoskeleton; extracellular exosome; mitochondrial membranes; Golgi apparatus; plasma membrane; synaptic vesicle; varicosity; nucleus; nucleoplasm; postsynaptic density; membrane; axon; cytoplasmic vesicle; protein-containing complex; dendritic spine; dendritic spine head; postsynaptic membrane; photoreceptor ribbon synapse; presynaptic endocytic zone membrane; postsynaptic endocytic zone membrane; glutamatergic synapse
Biological process	endocytosis; ephrin receptor signaling pathway; adult locomotory behavior; synaptic transmission, GABAergic; toxin transport; hearing; protein tetramerization; endosome organization; clathrin-dependent endocytosis; mitochondrial fission; dynamin family protein polymerization involved in mitochondrial fission; membrane fusion; synaptic vesicle budding from presynaptic endocytic zone membrane; G protein-coupled receptor internalization; receptor-mediated endocytosis; receptor internalization; positive regulation of synaptic vesicle recycling; synaptic vesicle endocytosis; regulation of synapse structure or activity; modulation of chemical synaptic transmission; postsynaptic neurotransmitter receptor internalization; regulation of synaptic vesicle endocytosis; positive regulation of synaptic vesicle endocytosis; response to amyloid-beta
Sources:Amigo / QuickGO
Orthologs
Databases	NCBI: entry; OMA: entry
Species	Human	Mouse
Entrez	1759	13429
Ensembl	ENSG00000106976	ENSMUSG00000026825
UniProt	Q05193	P39053
RefSeq (mRNA)	NM_001005336; NM_001288737; NM_001288738; NM_001288739; NM_004408 NM_001374269	NM_001301737; NM_010065; NM_001368679
RefSeq (protein)	NP_001005336; NP_001275666; NP_001275667; NP_001275668; NP_004399 NP_001361198	NP_001288666; NP_034195; NP_001355608
Location (UCSC)	Chr 9: 128.19 – 128.26 Mb	Chr 2: 32.2 – 32.24 Mb
PubMed search
- Wikidata
View/Edit Human	View/Edit Mouse

Dynamin-1 is a protein that in humans is encoded by the DNM1 gene.

== Function ==
Dynamin possesses unique mechanochemical properties used to tubulate and sever membranes, and is involved in clathrin-mediated endocytosis and other vesicular trafficking processes. Actin and other cytoskeletal proteins act as binding partners for the dynamin, which can also self-assemble leading to stimulation of GTPase activity. More than sixty highly conserved copies of the 3' region of this gene are found elsewhere in the genome, particularly on chromosomes Y and 15. Alternatively spliced transcript variants encoding different isoforms have been described.

== Role in disease ==
De novo mutations in DNM1 have been associated with a severe form of childhood epilepsy called developmental and epileptic encephalopathy. Most pathogenic variants are missense variants, and have been shown to impair synaptic vesicle endocytosis in a dominant negative manner.

== Interactions ==
DNM1 has been shown to interact with:

- AMPH,
- FNBP1,
- Grb2
- NCK1,
- PACSIN1, and
- SH3GL2.
