= ADAM9 =

Protein-coding gene in humans

Identifiers
- Aliases: ADAM9, CORD9, MCMP, MDC9, Mltng, ADAM metallopeptidase domain 9
- External IDs: OMIM: 602713; MGI: 105376; GeneCards: ADAM9
Available structures
PDB	Ortholog search: PDBe RCSB
PDB	List of PDB id codes 1M1V

Gene location (Human)
Chr.	Chromosome 8 (human)
Band	8p11.22	Start	38,996,754 bp
Band	8p11.22	End	39,105,445 bp

Gene location (Mouse)
Chr.	Chromosome 8 (mouse)
Band	8 A2|8 13.7 cM	Start	25,439,627 bp
Band	8 A2|8 13.7 cM	End	25,506,943 bp
RNA expression pattern
Bgee	Human / Mouse (ortholog); Top expressed in: stromal cell of endometrium; islet of Langerhans; gallbladder; smooth muscle tissue; right lung; Descending thoracic aorta; Achilles tendon; ascending aorta; upper lobe of left lung; rectum / Top expressed in: endothelial cell of lymphatic vessel; stroma of bone marrow; seminal vesicula; retinal pigment epithelium; epithelium of lens; left lung lobe; Paneth cell; right lung; parotid gland; gastric mucosa; More reference expression data
BioGPS	n/a
Gene ontology
Molecular function	collagen binding; SH3 domain binding; metal ion binding; integrin binding; peptidase activity; protein binding; metalloendopeptidase activity; laminin binding; hydrolase activity; metallopeptidase activity; protein kinase C binding
Cellular component	integral component of membrane; membrane; focal adhesion; intrinsic component of external side of plasma membrane; plasma membrane; extracellular region; extracellular exosome; cell surface; basolateral plasma membrane; extracellular space
Biological process	positive regulation of membrane protein ectodomain proteolysis; response to glucocorticoid; positive regulation of macrophage fusion; cell-cell adhesion mediated by integrin; keratinocyte differentiation; proteolysis; monocyte activation; response to calcium ion; response to tumor necrosis factor; positive regulation of keratinocyte migration; cell adhesion; response to manganese ion; membrane protein ectodomain proteolysis; positive regulation of protein secretion; integrin-mediated signaling pathway; positive regulation of cell adhesion mediated by integrin; cell-matrix adhesion; cellular response to lipopolysaccharide; transforming growth factor beta receptor signaling pathway; response to hydrogen peroxide; cell migration; cell adhesion mediated by integrin; response to laminar fluid shear stress; response to antineoplastic agent
Sources:Amigo / QuickGO
Orthologs
Databases	NCBI: entry; OMA: entry
Species	Human	Mouse
Entrez	8754	11502
Ensembl	ENSG00000168615; ENSG00000282230	ENSMUSG00000031555
UniProt	Q13443	Q61072
RefSeq (mRNA)	NM_001005845; NM_003816	NM_001270996; NM_007404
RefSeq (protein)	NP_003807	NP_001257925; NP_031430
Location (UCSC)	Chr 8: 39 – 39.11 Mb	Chr 8: 25.44 – 25.51 Mb
PubMed search
- Wikidata
View/Edit Human	View/Edit Mouse

Disintegrin and metalloproteinase domain-containing protein 9 is an enzyme that in humans is encoded by the ADAM9 gene.

== Function ==
This gene encodes a member of the ADAM (a disintegrin and metalloprotease domain) family. Members of this family are membrane-anchored proteins structurally related to snake venom disintegrins, and have been implicated in a variety of biological processes involving cell-cell and cell-matrix interactions, including fertilization, muscle development, and neurogenesis. The protein encoded by this gene interacts with SH3 domain-containing proteins, binds mitotic arrest deficient 2 beta protein, and is also involved in TPA-induced ectodomain shedding of membrane-anchored heparin-binding EGF-like growth factor. Two alternative splice variants have been identified, encoding distinct isoforms.

== Interactions ==
ADAM9 has been shown to interact with:

- MAD2L2,
- SH3GL2, and
- SNX9
