= ARHGAP33 =

Protein-coding gene in the species Homo sapiens

Identifiers
- Aliases: ARHGAP33, NOMA-GAP, SNX26, TCGAP, Rho GTPase activating protein 33
- External IDs: OMIM: 614902; MGI: 2673998; GeneCards: ARHGAP33

Gene location (Human)
Chr.	Chromosome 19 (human)
Band	19q13.12	Start	35,774,532 bp
Band	19q13.12	End	35,788,822 bp

Gene location (Mouse)
Chr.	Chromosome 7 (mouse)
Band	7|7 B1	Start	30,522,226 bp
Band	7|7 B1	End	30,535,060 bp
RNA expression pattern
Bgee	Human / Mouse (ortholog); Top expressed in: ganglionic eminence; ventricular zone; right uterine tube; right hemisphere of cerebellum; right frontal lobe; C1 segment; anterior pituitary; right testis; left testis; right ovary / Top expressed in: superior frontal gyrus; olfactory tubercle; piriform cortex; visual cortex; primary visual cortex; subiculum; nucleus accumbens; ganglionic eminence; ventricular zone; prefrontal cortex; More reference expression data
BioGPS	n/a
Gene ontology
Molecular function	phosphatidylinositol binding; protein binding; GTPase activator activity; protein kinase binding
Cellular component	cytosol; cytoplasm; plasma membrane; cell cortex; actin cytoskeleton; protein-containing complex; dendritic spine
Biological process	regulation of small GTPase mediated signal transduction; protein transport; positive regulation of GTPase activity; signal transduction; small GTPase mediated signal transduction; response to toxic substance; regulation of dendritic spine morphogenesis
Sources:Amigo / QuickGO
Orthologs
Databases	NCBI: entry; OMA: entry
Species	Human	Mouse
Entrez	115703	233071
Ensembl	ENSG00000004777	ENSMUSG00000036882
UniProt	O14559	Q80YF9
RefSeq (mRNA)	NM_001172630; NM_052948; NM_001366178	NM_001289670; NM_001289682; NM_178252
RefSeq (protein)	NP_001166101; NP_443180; NP_001353107	NP_001276599; NP_001276611; NP_839983
Location (UCSC)	Chr 19: 35.77 – 35.79 Mb	Chr 7: 30.52 – 30.54 Mb
PubMed search
- Wikidata
View/Edit Human	View/Edit Mouse

Rho GTPase-activating protein 33 is a protein that in humans is encoded by the ARHGAP33 gene (previously SNX26). Predictions suggest that it may be involved in insulin signaling and glucose transport, potentially as a downstream effector of RHOQ.

This gene encodes a member of the sorting nexin family. Members of this family contain a phox (PX) domain, which is a phosphoinositide binding domain, and are involved in intracellular trafficking. The specific function of this protein has not been elucidated. Alternative splice variants have been described but their full length nature has not been determined.
