= ADAM15 =

Protein-coding gene in humans

Identifiers
- Aliases: ADAM15, MDC15, ADAM metallopeptidase domain 15
- External IDs: OMIM: 605548; MGI: 1333882; GeneCards: ADAM15

Gene location (Human)
Chr.	Chromosome 1 (human)
Band	1q21.3	Start	155,050,566 bp
Band	1q21.3	End	155,062,775 bp

Gene location (Mouse)
Chr.	Chromosome 3 (mouse)
Band	3 F1|3 39.07 cM	Start	89,245,849 bp
Band	3 F1|3 39.07 cM	End	89,257,303 bp
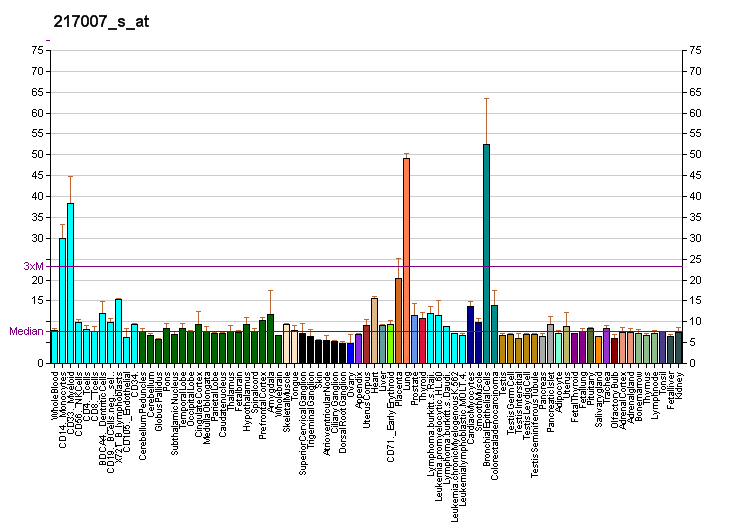
RNA expression pattern
Bgee	Human / Mouse (ortholog); Top expressed in: skin of leg; skin of abdomen; apex of heart; tibial nerve; left uterine tube; gastric mucosa; minor salivary glands; upper lobe of left lung; right lung; olfactory zone of nasal mucosa / Top expressed in: granulocyte; lip; superior frontal gyrus; gastrula; gallbladder; superior surface of tongue; dentate gyrus of hippocampal formation granule cell; primary visual cortex; esophagus; muscle of thigh; More reference expression data
BioGPS	More reference expression data
Gene ontology
Molecular function	SH3 domain binding; metal ion binding; integrin binding; peptidase activity; protein binding; hydrolase activity; metallopeptidase activity; metalloendopeptidase activity
Cellular component	integral component of membrane; cell projection; membrane; adherens junction; plasma membrane; cell surface; cell junction; acrosomal vesicle; extracellular exosome; cytoplasmic vesicle; endomembrane system; motile cilium; cilium
Biological process	male gonad development; negative regulation of receptor binding; tissue regeneration; extracellular matrix disassembly; proteolysis; negative regulation of cell-matrix adhesion; negative regulation of cell migration; cell adhesion; negative regulation of cell growth; angiogenesis; collagen catabolic process; integrin-mediated signaling pathway; cell-matrix adhesion; innate immune response; cardiac epithelial to mesenchymal transition; apoptotic process; extracellular matrix organization; immune response to tumor cell; cellular response to phorbol 13-acetate 12-myristate; response to hypobaric hypoxia
Sources:Amigo / QuickGO
Orthologs
Databases	NCBI: entry; OMA: entry
Species	Human	Mouse
Entrez	8751	11490
Ensembl	ENSG00000143537	ENSMUSG00000028041
UniProt	Q13444	O88839
RefSeq (mRNA)	NM_001261464; NM_001261465; NM_001261466; NM_003815; NM_207191 NM_207194; NM_207195; NM_207196; NM_207197	NM_001037722; NM_009614
RefSeq (protein)	NP_001248393; NP_001248394; NP_001248395; NP_003806; NP_997074 NP_997077; NP_997078; NP_997079; NP_997080	NP_001032811; NP_033744
Location (UCSC)	Chr 1: 155.05 – 155.06 Mb	Chr 3: 89.25 – 89.26 Mb
PubMed search
- Wikidata
View/Edit Human	View/Edit Mouse

Disintegrin and metalloproteinase domain-containing protein 15 is an enzyme that in humans is encoded by the ADAM15 gene.

== Function ==
The protein encoded by this gene is a member of the ADAM (a disintegrin and metalloproteinase) protein family. ADAM family members are type I transmembrane glycoproteins known to be involved in cell adhesion and proteolytic ectodomain processing of cytokines and adhesion molecules. This protein contains multiple functional domains including a zinc-binding metalloprotease domain, a disintegrin-like domain, as well as an EGF-like domain. Through its disintegrin-like domain, this protein specifically interacts with the integrin beta chain, beta 3. It also interacts with Src family protein-tyrosine kinases in a phosphorylation-dependent manner, suggesting that this protein may function in cell-cell adhesion as well as in cellular signaling. Multiple alternatively spliced transcript variants encoding distinct isoforms have been observed.

== Clinical significance ==
=== Arthritis ===
ADAM15 has been associated with a number of diseases, most recently Rheumatoid Arthritis where it is required for the activation of the FAK and Src pathways to generate apoptosis resistance in response to apoptotic signalling or cell stress. ADAM15 also has an antiapoptotic effect in osteoarthritic chondrocytes.

=== Cancer ===
The precise role of ADAM15 in cancer is still unclear but the metalloprotein has been linked to a number of different cancerous diseases such as Breast cancer where the expression of the protein is increased in carcinoma in-situ, invasive carcinoma and metastatic breast cancer tissues Additionally, the alternative splice variant forms of ADAM15 have also been correlated with different prognosis in 48 breast cancer patients based upon their expression levels. ADAM15 has also been shown to have a role in prostate cancer again through increased expression in neoplastic and metastatic tissues compared to normal prostate tissues and also through its modulation of epithelial cell- tumour cell interactions.

== Interactions ==
ADAM15 has been shown to interact with:

- Grb2,
- HCK,
- Lck and
- SH3GL2, and
- SNX9.

The alternatively spliced isoforms have also been shown to exhibit different preferential interactions with proteins containing SH3 domains.
