= SNX15 =

Protein-coding gene in the species Homo sapiens

Identifiers
- Aliases: SNX15, HSAF001435, sorting nexin 15
- External IDs: OMIM: 605964; MGI: 1916274; GeneCards: SNX15

Gene location (Mouse)
Chr.	Chromosome 19 (mouse)
Band	19|19 A	Start	6,169,429 bp
Band	19|19 A	End	6,178,334 bp
RNA expression pattern
Bgee	Human / Mouse (ortholog); Top expressed in: bone marrow cell; prefrontal cortex; cerebellar hemisphere; monocyte; skeletal muscle tissue; gastrocnemius muscle; popliteal artery; right coronary artery; Brodmann area 9; amygdala / Top expressed in: blood; neural layer of retina; superior frontal gyrus; fetal liver hematopoietic progenitor cell; islet of Langerhans; yolk sac; lip; gastric mucosa; primary visual cortex; epithelium of stomach; More reference expression data
BioGPS	n/a
Gene ontology
Molecular function	protein binding; phosphatidylinositol binding; lipid binding
Cellular component	nucleolus; cytoplasmic vesicle membrane; membrane; cytoplasmic vesicle; cytoplasm; cytosol
Biological process	protein transport; signal transduction; intracellular protein transport
Sources:Amigo / QuickGO
Orthologs
Databases	NCBI: entry
Species	Human	Mouse
Entrez	29907	69024
Ensembl	n/a	ENSMUSG00000024787
UniProt	Q9NRS6	Q91WE1
RefSeq (mRNA)	NM_147777; NM_013306	NM_026912
RefSeq (protein)	NP_037438; NP_680086	NP_081188
Location (UCSC)	n/a	Chr 19: 6.17 – 6.18 Mb
PubMed search
- Wikidata
View/Edit Human	View/Edit Mouse

Sorting nexin-15 is a protein that in humans is encoded by the SNX15 gene.

This gene encodes a member of the sorting nexin family. Members of this family contain a phox (PX) domain, which is a phosphoinositide binding domain, and are involved in intracellular trafficking. Overexpression of this gene results in a decrease in the processing of insulin and hepatocyte growth factor receptors to their mature subunits. This decrease is caused by the mislocalization of furin, the endoprotease responsible for cleavage of insulin and hepatocyte growth factor receptors. This protein is involved in endosomal trafficking from the plasma membranee to recycling endosomes or the trans-Golgi network. This gene encodes two transcript variants encoding distinct isoforms.
