= SH3PXD2A =

Protein-coding gene in the species Homo sapiens

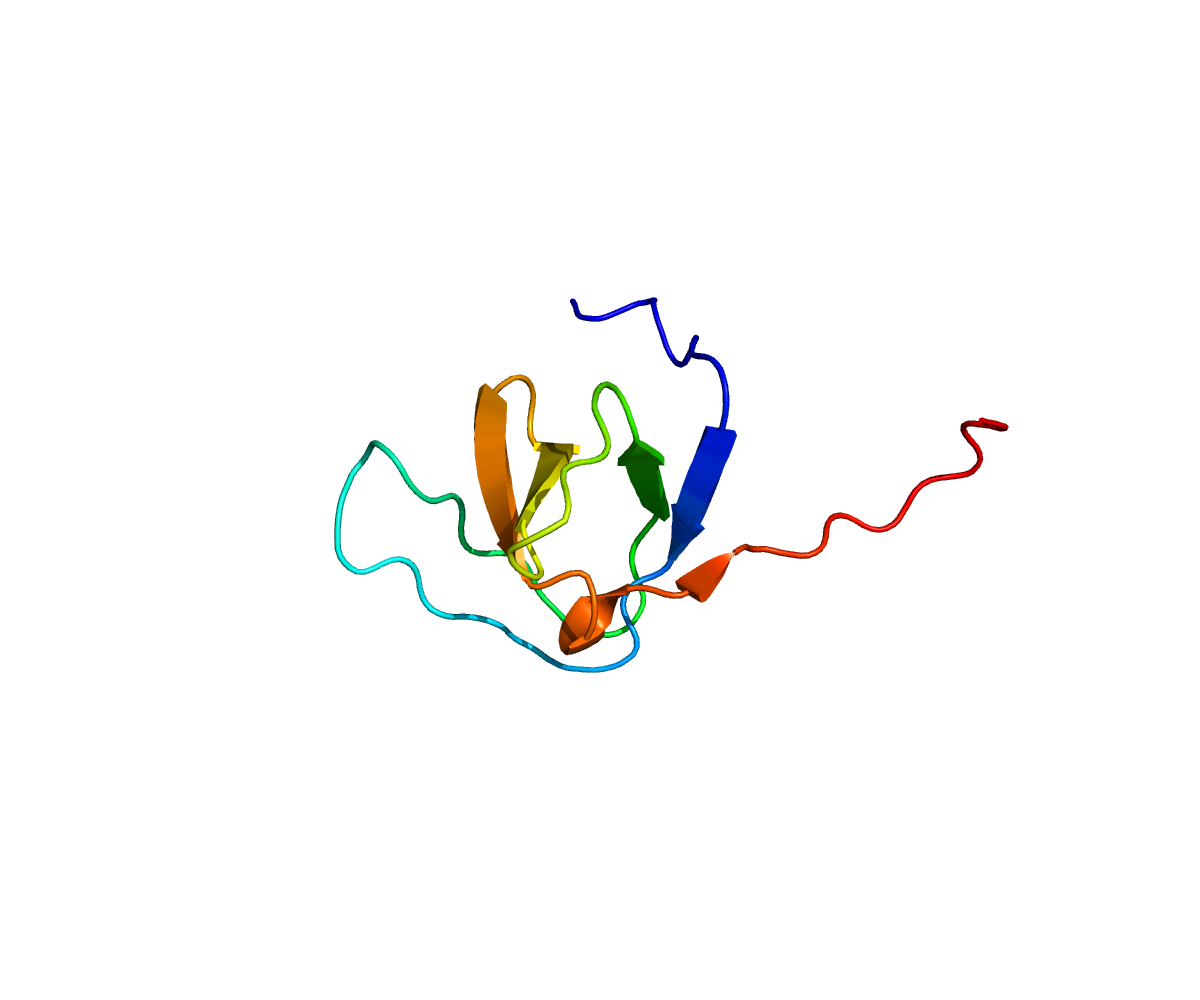

Identifiers
- Aliases: SH3PXD2A, FISH, SH3MD1, TKS5, SH3 and PX domains 2A
- External IDs: MGI: 1298393; GeneCards: SH3PXD2A
Available structures
PDB	Ortholog search: PDBe RCSB
PDB	List of PDB id codes 2DNU, 2EGA, 2EGC, 2EKH

Gene location (Human)
Chr.	Chromosome 10 (human)
Band	10q24.33	Start	103,594,027 bp
Band	10q24.33	End	103,855,543 bp

Gene location (Mouse)
Chr.	Chromosome 19 (mouse)
Band	19|19 C3	Start	47,248,613 bp
Band	19|19 C3	End	47,452,840 bp
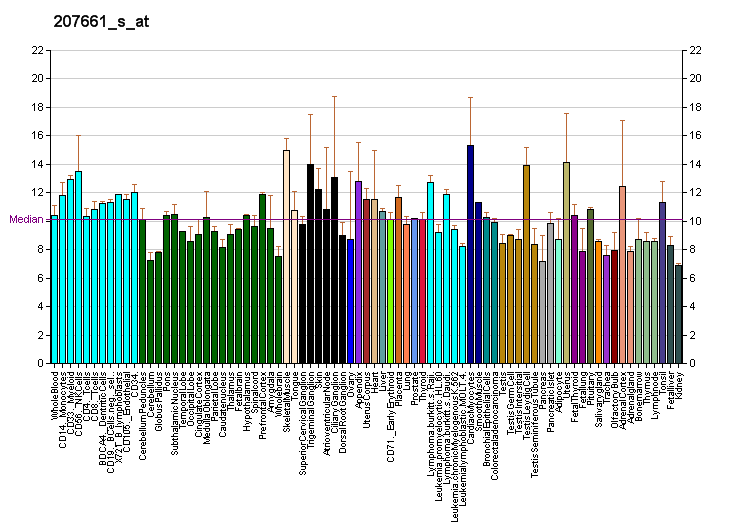

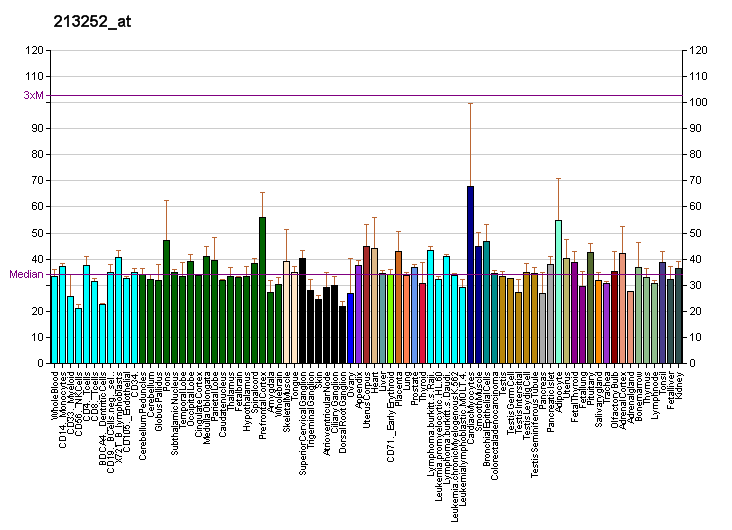
RNA expression pattern
Bgee	Human / Mouse (ortholog); Top expressed in: cervix; sural nerve; trigeminal ganglion; tibia; inferior ganglion of vagus nerve; myometrium; vagina; cecum; tendon / Top expressed in: molar; gastrula; ascending aorta; sciatic nerve; aortic valve; body of femur; umbilical cord; calvaria; skin of abdomen; utricle; More reference expression data
BioGPS	More reference expression data
Gene ontology
Molecular function	protein binding; superoxide-generating NADPH oxidase activator activity; phosphatidylinositol binding; protease binding; phosphatidylinositol-4,5-bisphosphate binding; phosphatidylinositol-5-phosphate binding; phosphatidylinositol-3-phosphate binding; phosphatidylinositol-3,4-bisphosphate binding; phosphatidylinositol-4-phosphate binding
Cellular component	cytoplasm; podosome; cell junction; cell projection; cytosol
Biological process	osteoclast fusion; superoxide metabolic process; reactive oxygen species metabolic process; positive regulation of catalytic activity; podosome assembly; extracellular matrix organization
Sources:Amigo / QuickGO
Orthologs
Databases	NCBI: entry; OMA: entry
Species	Human	Mouse
Entrez	9644	14218
Ensembl	ENSG00000107957	ENSMUSG00000053617
UniProt	Q5TCZ1	O89032
RefSeq (mRNA)	NM_014631; NM_001365079	NM_001164717; NM_008018; NM_177833
RefSeq (protein)	NP_055446; NP_001352008	NP_001158189; NP_032044
Location (UCSC)	Chr 10: 103.59 – 103.86 Mb	Chr 19: 47.25 – 47.45 Mb
PubMed search
- Wikidata
View/Edit Human	View/Edit Mouse

SH3 and PX domain-containing protein 2A is a protein that in humans is encoded by the SH3PXD2A gene.
