= SNX1 =

Protein-coding gene in the species Homo sapiens

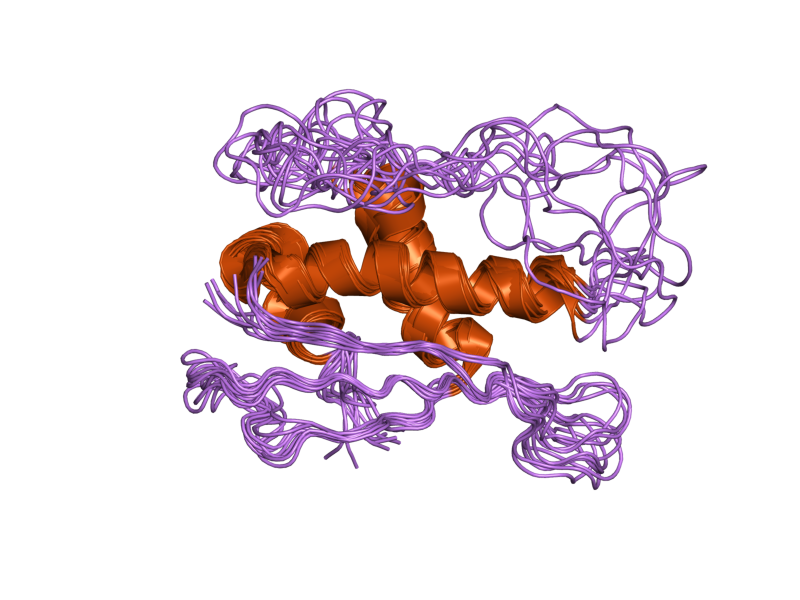

Identifiers
- Aliases: SNX1, HsT17379, VPS5, sorting nexin 1
- External IDs: OMIM: 601272; MGI: 1928395; GeneCards: SNX1
Available structures
PDB	Ortholog search: PDBe RCSB
PDB	List of PDB id codes 2I4K, 4FZS

Gene location (Human)
Chr.	Chromosome 15 (human)
Band	15q22.31	Start	64,094,123 bp
Band	15q22.31	End	64,146,090 bp

Gene location (Mouse)
Chr.	Chromosome 9 (mouse)
Band	9|9 C	Start	65,995,415 bp
Band	9|9 C	End	66,033,869 bp
RNA expression pattern
Bgee	Human / Mouse (ortholog); Top expressed in: right lobe of thyroid gland; left lobe of thyroid gland; right adrenal gland; right adrenal cortex; left adrenal gland; monocyte; upper lobe of left lung; ectocervix; C1 segment; left adrenal cortex / Top expressed in: spermatocyte; gastrula; spermatid; decidua; blastocyst; saccule; morula; yolk sac; lens; ventricular zone; More reference expression data
BioGPS	n/a
Gene ontology
Molecular function	protein homodimerization activity; insulin receptor binding; leptin receptor binding; epidermal growth factor receptor binding; protein binding; phosphatidylinositol binding; identical protein binding; protein heterodimerization activity; transferrin receptor binding; lipid binding; cadherin binding
Cellular component	cytoplasm; cytosol; Golgi apparatus; cell projection; early endosome membrane; membrane; retromer, tubulation complex; intracellular membrane-bounded organelle; retromer complex; early endosome; endosome membrane; lamellipodium; extrinsic component of membrane; vesicle; lysosome; endosome; protein-containing complex
Biological process	positive regulation of protein catabolic process; vesicle organization; early endosome to Golgi transport; receptor internalization; endosomal transport; retrograde transport, endosome to Golgi; protein transport; intracellular protein transport; lamellipodium morphogenesis
Sources:Amigo / QuickGO
Orthologs
Databases	NCBI: entry; OMA: entry
Species	Human	Mouse
Entrez	6642	56440
Ensembl	ENSG00000028528	ENSMUSG00000032382
UniProt	Q13596	Q9WV80
RefSeq (mRNA)	NM_001242933; NM_003099; NM_148955; NM_152826	NM_019727
RefSeq (protein)	NP_001229862; NP_003090; NP_683758	NP_062701
Location (UCSC)	Chr 15: 64.09 – 64.15 Mb	Chr 9: 66 – 66.03 Mb
PubMed search
- Wikidata
View/Edit Human	View/Edit Mouse

Sorting nexin-1 is a protein that in humans is encoded by the SNX1 gene. The protein encoded by this gene is a sorting nexin. SNX1 is a component of the retromer complex.

== Function ==
This gene encodes a member of the sorting nexin family. Members of this family contain a phox (PX) domain, which is a phosphoinositide binding domain, and are involved in intracellular trafficking. This endosomal protein regulates the cell-surface expression of epidermal growth factor receptor. This protein also has a role in sorting protease-activated receptor-1 from early endosomes to lysosomes. This protein may form oligomeric complexes with other family members.
