= Sorting nexin 10 =

Protein-coding gene in the species Homo sapiens

SNX10

Identifiers
- Aliases: SNX10, OPTB8, sorting nexin 10
- External IDs: OMIM: 614780; MGI: 1919232; GeneCards: SNX10
Available structures
PDB	Ortholog search: PDBe RCSB
PDB	List of PDB id codes 4ON3, 4PZG

Gene location (Human)
Chr.	Chromosome 7 (human)
Band	7p15.2	Start	26,291,862 bp
Band	7p15.2	End	26,374,383 bp

Gene location (Mouse)
Chr.	Chromosome 6 (mouse)
Band	6|6 B3	Start	51,523,901 bp
Band	6|6 B3	End	51,590,679 bp
RNA expression pattern
Bgee	Human / Mouse (ortholog); Top expressed in: lateral nuclear group of thalamus; pars compacta; pars reticulata; pons; monocyte; superior vestibular nucleus; Brodmann area 23; dorsolateral prefrontal cortex; spinal ganglia; prefrontal cortex / Top expressed in: granulocyte; dentate gyrus of hippocampal formation granule cell; facial motor nucleus; hippocampus proper; perirhinal cortex; temporal lobe; brown adipose tissue; piriform cortex; neural layer of retina; subiculum; More reference expression data
BioGPS	n/a
Gene ontology
Molecular function	ATPase binding; 1-phosphatidylinositol binding; protein binding; phosphatidylinositol binding; lipid binding
Cellular component	cytoplasm; endosome; centrosome; membrane; extrinsic component of endosome membrane; microtubule organizing center; endoplasmic reticulum; endosome membrane; cytoskeleton; nucleus; secretory granule; apical cytoplasm
Biological process	endocytosis; osteoclast differentiation; endosome organization; cell projection organization; protein localization to cilium; protein transport; protein localization to centrosome; cilium assembly; cellular response to leukemia inhibitory factor; gastric acid secretion; bone mineralization; tooth eruption; bone resorption; calcium ion homeostasis; ruffle assembly
Sources:Amigo / QuickGO
Orthologs
Databases	NCBI: entry; OMA: entry
Species	Human	Mouse
Entrez	29887	71982
Ensembl	ENSG00000086300	ENSMUSG00000038301
UniProt	Q9Y5X0; Q8N5Z3	Q9CWT3
RefSeq (mRNA)	NM_001199835; NM_001199837; NM_001199838; NM_013322; NM_001318198 NM_001318199; NM_001362753; NM_001362754	NM_001127348; NM_001127349; NM_028035
RefSeq (protein)	NP_001186764; NP_001186766; NP_001186767; NP_001305127; NP_001305128 NP_037454; NP_001349682; NP_001349683; NP_037454.2; NP_001305128.1	NP_001120820; NP_001120821; NP_082311; NP_001348505; NP_001348506 NP_001348507; NP_001348508; NP_001348509; NP_001348510; NP_001348511
Location (UCSC)	Chr 7: 26.29 – 26.37 Mb	Chr 6: 51.52 – 51.59 Mb
PubMed search
- Wikidata
View/Edit Human	View/Edit Mouse

Sorting nexin 10 is a protein that in humans is encoded by the SNX10 gene.

== Function ==
This gene encodes a member of the sorting nexin family. Members of this family contain a phox (PX) domain, which is a phosphoinositide binding domain, and are involved in intracellular trafficking. This protein does not contain a coiled coil region, like some family members. This gene may play a role in regulating endosome homeostasis. Alternative splicing results in multiple transcript variants.
