= ARHGAP44 =

Protein-coding gene in the species Homo sapiens

Identifiers
- Aliases: ARHGAP44, NPC-A-10, RICH2, Rho GTPase activating protein 44
- External IDs: OMIM: 617716; MGI: 2144423; GeneCards: ARHGAP44

Gene location (Human)
Chr.	Chromosome 17 (human)
Band	17p12	Start	12,789,498 bp
Band	17p12	End	12,991,643 bp

Gene location (Mouse)
Chr.	Chromosome 11 (mouse)
Band	11|11 B3	Start	64,892,865 bp
Band	11|11 B3	End	65,053,787 bp
RNA expression pattern
Bgee	Human / Mouse (ortholog); Top expressed in: lateral nuclear group of thalamus; Brodmann area 23; middle temporal gyrus; buccal mucosa cell; germinal epithelium; primary visual cortex; cerebellar cortex; cerebellar hemisphere; prefrontal cortex; right hemisphere of cerebellum / Top expressed in: medial vestibular nucleus; pontine nuclei; deep cerebellar nuclei; substantia nigra; medial dorsal nucleus; medial geniculate nucleus; lateral geniculate nucleus; dorsal tegmental nucleus; piriform cortex; primary motor cortex; More reference expression data
BioGPS	n/a
Gene ontology
Molecular function	protein binding; phospholipid binding; GTPase activator activity
Cellular component	cytoplasm; recycling endosome; cytosol; cell junction; endosome; dendritic spine; cell projection; synapse; leading edge membrane; glutamatergic synapse; intracellular anatomical structure; postsynaptic density; presynaptic active zone
Biological process	positive regulation of GTPase activity; regulation of small GTPase mediated signal transduction; signal transduction; exocytosis; regulation of actin cytoskeleton organization; regulation of GTPase activity; regulation of dendritic spine morphogenesis; modification of dendritic spine; neurotransmitter receptor transport, endosome to postsynaptic membrane; negative regulation of Rac protein signal transduction; modification of postsynaptic structure; regulation of neurotransmitter receptor transport, endosome to postsynaptic membrane
Sources:Amigo / QuickGO
Orthologs
Databases	NCBI: entry; OMA: entry
Species	Human	Mouse
Entrez	9912	216831
Ensembl	ENSG00000006740	ENSMUSG00000033389
UniProt	Q17R89	Q5SSM3
RefSeq (mRNA)	NM_014859; NM_001321164; NM_001321166; NM_001321167; NM_001321168	NM_001099288; NM_175003
RefSeq (protein)	NP_001308093; NP_001308095; NP_001308096; NP_001308097; NP_055674	NP_001092758; NP_778168; NP_001395152; NP_001395153; NP_001395155 NP_001395157
Location (UCSC)	Chr 17: 12.79 – 12.99 Mb	Chr 11: 64.89 – 65.05 Mb
PubMed search
- Wikidata
View/Edit Human	View/Edit Mouse

Rho GTPase activating protein 44 is a protein in humans that is encoded by the ARHGAP44 gene.
