= SNX4 =

Protein-coding gene in the species Homo sapiens

Identifiers
- Aliases: SNX4, ATG24B, sorting nexin 4
- External IDs: OMIM: 605931; MGI: 1916400; GeneCards: SNX4

Gene location (Human)
Chr.	Chromosome 3 (human)
Band	3q21.2	Start	125,446,650 bp
Band	3q21.2	End	125,520,202 bp

Gene location (Mouse)
Chr.	Chromosome 16 (mouse)
Band	16|16 B3	Start	33,071,812 bp
Band	16|16 B3	End	33,120,639 bp
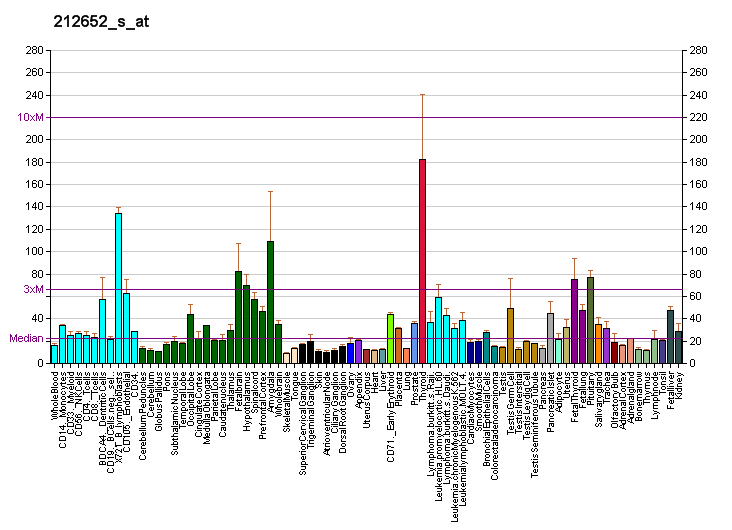

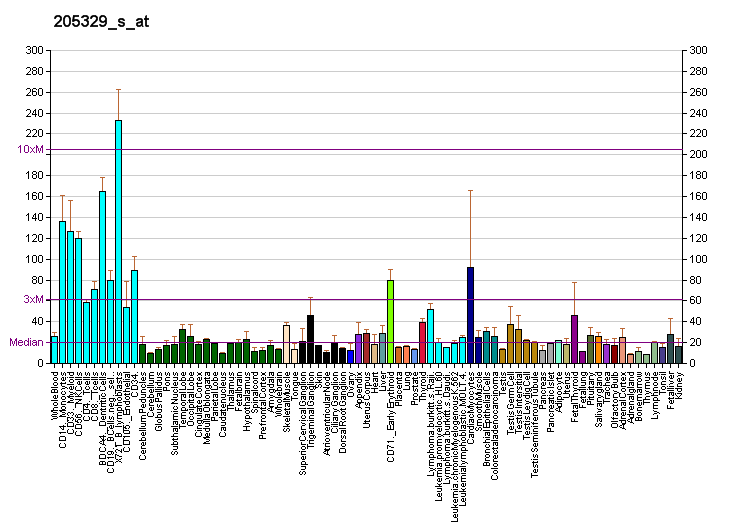
RNA expression pattern
Bgee	Human / Mouse (ortholog); Top expressed in: secondary oocyte; jejunal mucosa; Achilles tendon; kidney tubule; ganglionic eminence; ventricular zone; islet of Langerhans; duodenum; Epithelium of choroid plexus; tendon of biceps brachii / Top expressed in: atrioventricular valve; left lung lobe; endocardial cushion; sciatic nerve; granulocyte; yolk sac; vestibular sensory epithelium; ureter; primitive streak; zygote; More reference expression data
BioGPS	More reference expression data
Gene ontology
Molecular function	insulin receptor binding; leptin receptor binding; epidermal growth factor receptor binding; protein binding; phosphatidylinositol binding; transferrin receptor binding; lipid binding
Cellular component	cytoplasm; extrinsic component of membrane; endosome; early endosome membrane; membrane; plasma membrane; SNARE complex; cytoplasmic dynein complex; protein-containing complex; early endosome
Biological process	endocytosis; vesicle organization; endocytic recycling; protein transport; positive regulation of histamine secretion by mast cell
Sources:Amigo / QuickGO
Orthologs
Databases	NCBI: entry; OMA: entry
Species	Human	Mouse
Entrez	8723	69150
Ensembl	ENSG00000114520	ENSMUSG00000022808
UniProt	O95219	Q91YJ2
RefSeq (mRNA)	NM_003794	NM_080557
RefSeq (protein)	NP_003785	NP_542124
Location (UCSC)	Chr 3: 125.45 – 125.52 Mb	Chr 16: 33.07 – 33.12 Mb
PubMed search
- Wikidata
View/Edit Human	View/Edit Mouse

Sorting nexin-4 is a protein that in humans is encoded by the SNX4 gene.

This gene encodes a member of the sorting nexin family. Members of this family contain a phox (PX) domain, which is a phosphoinositide binding domain, and are involved in intracellular trafficking. This protein associated with the long isoform of the leptin receptor and with receptor tyrosine kinases for platelet-derived growth factor, insulin, and epidermal growth factor in cell cultures, but its function is unknown. This protein may form oligomeric complexes with family members.

== Interactions ==
SNX4 has been shown to interact with BIN1.
