= RPS6KC1 =

Enzyme found in humans

Identifiers
- Aliases: RPS6KC1, RPK118, RSKL1, S6K-delta-1, S6PKh1, humS6PKh1, ribosomal protein S6 kinase C1
- External IDs: OMIM: 617517; MGI: 2443419; GeneCards: RPS6KC1

Gene location (Mouse)
Chr.	Chromosome 1 (mouse)
Band	1|1 H6	Start	190,432,399 bp
Band	1|1 H6	End	190,643,967 bp
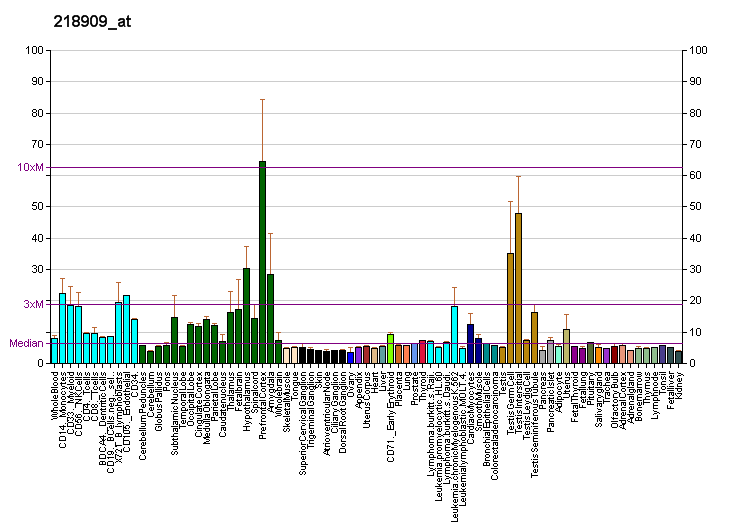
RNA expression pattern
Bgee	Human / Mouse (ortholog); n/a / Top expressed in: dentate gyrus of hippocampal formation granule cell; supraoptic nucleus; granulocyte; neural layer of retina; muscle of thigh; stroma of bone marrow; otic vesicle; cingulate gyrus; saccule; yolk sac
BioGPS	More reference expression data
Gene ontology
Molecular function	transferase activity; nucleotide binding; protein kinase activity; protein serine/threonine kinase activity; protein binding; ATP binding; phosphatidylinositol binding; kinase activity; lipid binding
Cellular component	membrane; cytoplasm; endosome; early endosome
Biological process	protein phosphorylation; signal transduction; phosphorylation
Sources:Amigo / QuickGO
Orthologs
Databases	NCBI: entry; OMA: entry
Species	Human	Mouse
Entrez	26750	320119
Ensembl	ENSG00000136643	ENSMUSG00000089872
UniProt	Q96S38	Q8BLK9
RefSeq (mRNA)	NM_001136138; NM_001287218; NM_001287219; NM_001287220; NM_001287221 NM_012424	NM_178775
RefSeq (protein)	NP_001129610; NP_001274147; NP_001274148; NP_001274149; NP_001274150 NP_036556; NP_001336575; NP_001336576; NP_001336577; NP_001336578; NP_001336579; NP_001336580; NP_001336581; NP_001336582; NP_001336583; NP_001336586; NP_001336587; NP_001336588; NP_001336589; NP_001336590; NP_001336591; NP_001336592; NP_001336593; NP_001336594; NP_001336595; NP_001336596; NP_001336597; NP_001336598; NP_001336599; NP_001336600; NP_001336601	NP_848890
Location (UCSC)	n/a	Chr 1: 190.43 – 190.64 Mb
PubMed search
- Wikidata
View/Edit Human	View/Edit Mouse

Ribosomal protein S6 kinase delta-1 is an enzyme that in humans is encoded by the RPS6KC1 gene.
