= SNX17 =

Protein-coding gene in the species Homo sapiens

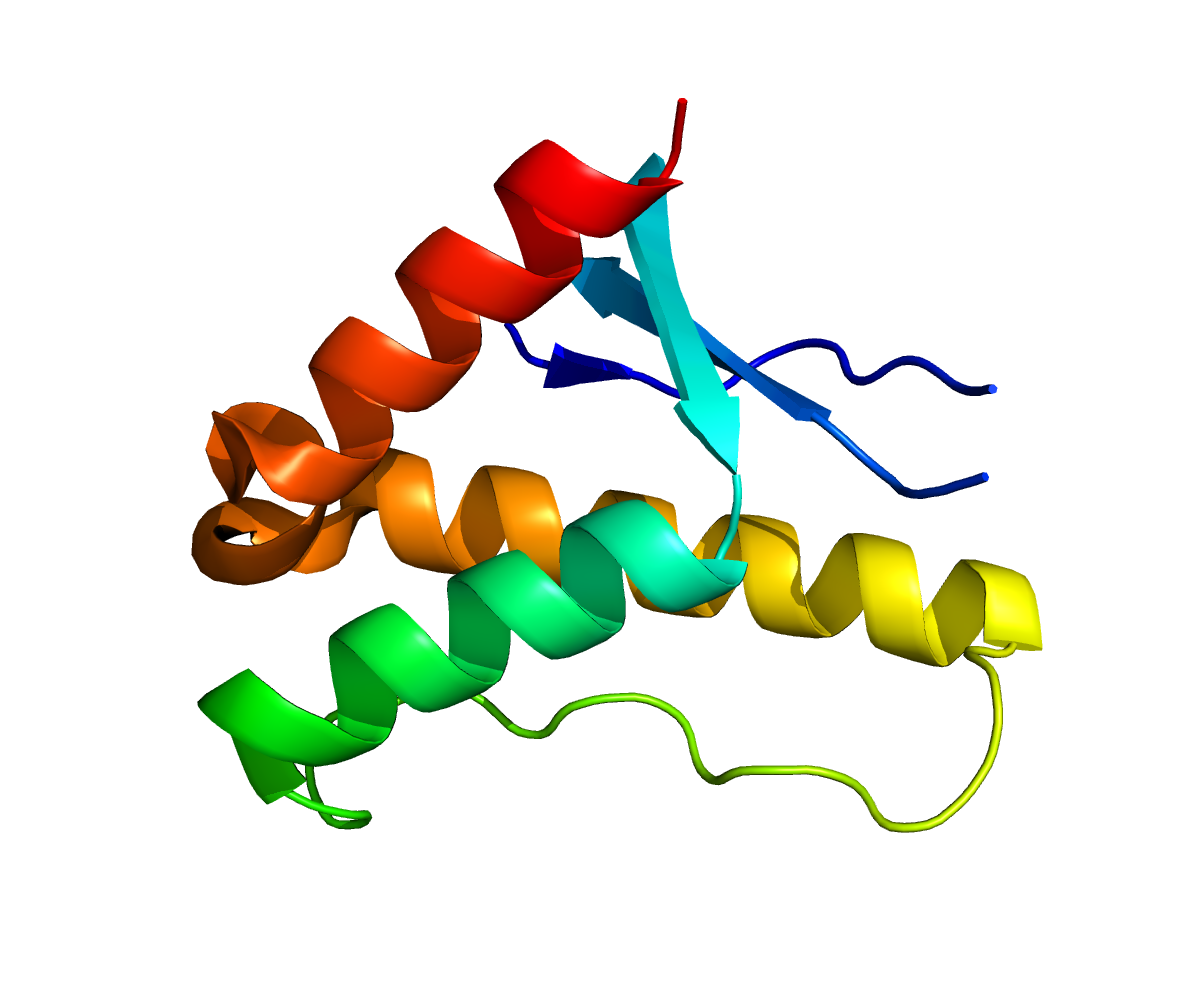

Identifiers
- Aliases: SNX17, sorting nexin 17
- External IDs: OMIM: 605963; MGI: 2387801; GeneCards: SNX17
Available structures
PDB	Ortholog search: PDBe RCSB
PDB	List of PDB id codes 3FOG, 3LUI, 4GXB, 4TKN

Gene location (Human)
Chr.	Chromosome 2 (human)
Band	2p23.3	Start	27,370,496 bp
Band	2p23.3	End	27,377,535 bp

Gene location (Mouse)
Chr.	Chromosome 5 (mouse)
Band	5|5 B1	Start	31,350,571 bp
Band	5|5 B1	End	31,356,487 bp
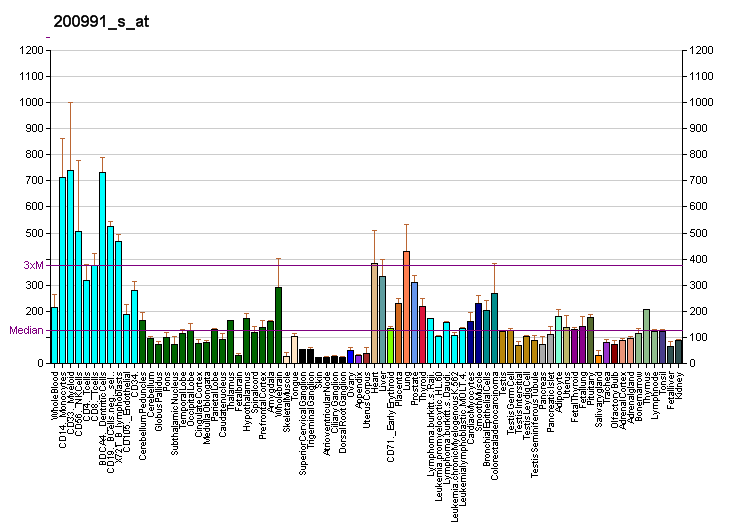
RNA expression pattern
Bgee	Human / Mouse (ortholog); Top expressed in: granulocyte; right adrenal gland; right adrenal cortex; monocyte; left adrenal gland; left adrenal cortex; anterior pituitary; stromal cell of endometrium; right coronary artery; spleen / Top expressed in: medial ganglionic eminence; renal corpuscle; internal carotid artery; external carotid artery; epithelium of lens; Paneth cell; vestibular membrane of cochlear duct; Rostral migratory stream; endocardial cushion; median eminence; More reference expression data
BioGPS	More reference expression data
Gene ontology
Molecular function	low-density lipoprotein particle receptor binding; protein C-terminus binding; protein binding; phosphatidylinositol binding; signaling receptor binding; lipid binding
Cellular component	cytosol; endosome; Golgi apparatus; membrane; intracellular membrane-bounded organelle; early endosome; endosome membrane; cytoplasmic vesicle membrane; cytoplasm; cytoplasmic vesicle; protein-containing complex
Biological process	regulation of endocytosis; cardiac septum development; cholesterol catabolic process; receptor-mediated endocytosis; coronary vasculature development; endosomal transport; aorta development; protein transport; signal transduction; intracellular protein transport; endocytic recycling
Sources:Amigo / QuickGO
Orthologs
Databases	NCBI: entry; OMA: entry
Species	Human	Mouse
Entrez	9784	266781
Ensembl	ENSG00000115234	ENSMUSG00000029146
UniProt	Q15036	Q8BVL3
RefSeq (mRNA)	NM_001267059; NM_001267060; NM_001267061; NM_014748	NM_153680
RefSeq (protein)	NP_001253988; NP_001253989; NP_001253990; NP_055563	NP_710147
Location (UCSC)	Chr 2: 27.37 – 27.38 Mb	Chr 5: 31.35 – 31.36 Mb
PubMed search
- Wikidata
View/Edit Human	View/Edit Mouse

Sorting nexin-17 is a protein that in humans is encoded by the SNX17 gene.

== Function ==
This gene encodes a member of the sorting nexin family. Members of this family contain a phox (PX) domain, which is a phosphoinositide binding domain, and are involved in intracellular trafficking. This protein does not contain a coiled coil region, like some family members, but contains a B41 domain. This protein interacts with the cytoplasmic domain of P-selectin, and may function in the intracellular trafficking of P-selectin.

== Interactions ==
SNX17 has been shown to interact with Low density lipoprotein receptor-related protein 8,
