= SH3BP1 =

Protein-coding gene in the species Homo sapiens

Identifiers
- Aliases: SH3BP1, ARHGAP43, SH3 domain binding protein 1
- External IDs: OMIM: 617368; MGI: 104603; GeneCards: SH3BP1
Available structures
PDB	Ortholog search: PDBe RCSB
PDB	List of PDB id codes 4J9D, 4J9F

Gene location (Human)
Chr.	Chromosome 22 (human)
Band	22q13.1	Start	37,634,654 bp
Band	22q13.1	End	37,656,117 bp

Gene location (Mouse)
Chr.	Chromosome 15 (mouse)
Band	15|15 E1	Start	78,783,968 bp
Band	15|15 E1	End	78,796,251 bp
RNA expression pattern
Bgee	Human / Mouse (ortholog); Top expressed in: granulocyte; monocyte; mucosa of transverse colon; skin of abdomen; spleen; skin of leg; rectum; lymph node; blood; appendix / Top expressed in: granulocyte; lip; yolk sac; esophagus; mesenteric lymph nodes; thymus; superior frontal gyrus; genital tubercle; tail of embryo; primary visual cortex; More reference expression data
BioGPS	n/a
Gene ontology
Molecular function	SH3 domain binding; protein binding; GTPase activator activity; semaphorin receptor binding
Cellular component	cytoplasm; exocyst; lamellipodium; phagocytic cup; nucleus; cytosol; adherens junction; bicellular tight junction; cell junction; cell projection; cell leading edge; intracellular anatomical structure
Biological process	signal transduction; phagocytosis, engulfment; actin filament organization; regulation of actin filament depolymerization; regulation of actin cytoskeleton organization; cell junction assembly; regulation of blood vessel endothelial cell migration; establishment of epithelial cell apical/basal polarity; negative regulation of small GTPase mediated signal transduction; semaphorin-plexin signaling pathway; phagocytosis; cell migration; positive regulation of GTPase activity; filopodium assembly; ruffle assembly
Sources:Amigo / QuickGO
Orthologs
Databases	NCBI: entry; OMA: entry
Species	Human	Mouse
Entrez	23616	20401
Ensembl	ENSG00000100092	ENSMUSG00000022436
UniProt	Q9Y3L3	P55194
RefSeq (mRNA)	NM_018957; NM_001350055	NM_009164; NM_001316684; NM_001316685; NM_001316686
RefSeq (protein)	NP_061830; NP_001336984	NP_001303613; NP_001303614; NP_001303615; NP_033190
Location (UCSC)	Chr 22: 37.63 – 37.66 Mb	Chr 15: 78.78 – 78.8 Mb
PubMed search
- Wikidata
View/Edit Human	View/Edit Mouse

SH3 domain-binding protein 1 is a protein that in humans is encoded by the SH3BP1 gene.
