= SH3GL1 =

Protein-coding gene in the species Homo sapiens

Identifiers
- Aliases: SH3GL1, CNSA1, EEN, SH3D2B, SH3P8, SH3 domain containing GRB2 like 1, endophilin A2
- External IDs: OMIM: 601768; MGI: 700010; GeneCards: SH3GL1

Gene location (Human)
Chr.	Chromosome 19 (human)
Band	19p13.3	Start	4,360,370 bp
Band	19p13.3	End	4,400,547 bp

Gene location (Mouse)
Chr.	Chromosome 17 (mouse)
Band	17 D|17 29.11 cM	Start	56,323,750 bp
Band	17 D|17 29.11 cM	End	56,343,635 bp
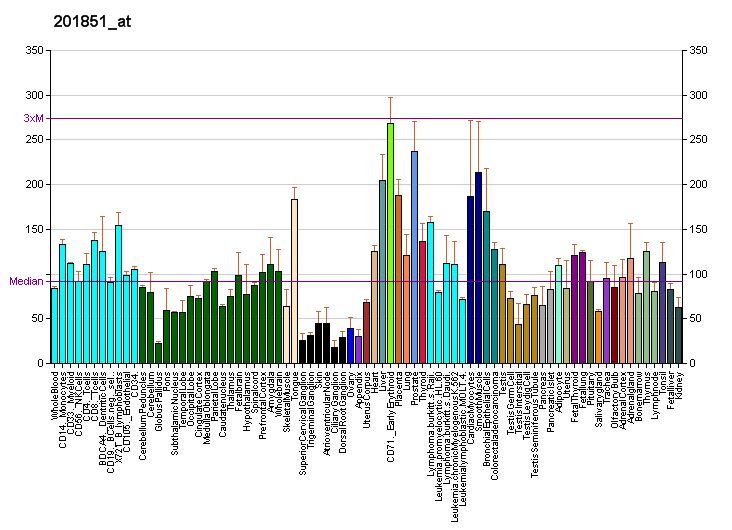
RNA expression pattern
Bgee	Human / Mouse (ortholog); Top expressed in: skin of leg; skin of abdomen; mucosa of pharynx; ectocervix; stromal cell of endometrium; olfactory bulb; left adrenal cortex; right adrenal cortex; gastric mucosa; vagina / Top expressed in: spermatocyte; granulocyte; lip; yolk sac; calvaria; spermatid; esophagus; neural tube; embryo; internal carotid artery; More reference expression data
BioGPS	More reference expression data
Gene ontology
Molecular function	protein binding; identical protein binding; lipid binding; cadherin binding; SH3 domain binding; beta-1 adrenergic receptor binding; transmembrane transporter binding; protein C-terminus binding; phosphatase binding; GTPase binding
Cellular component	cytoplasm; podosome; cell junction; endosome; cell projection; early endosome membrane; membrane; cytosol; hippocampal mossy fiber to CA3 synapse; synapse; Schaffer collateral - CA1 synapse; presynapse; glutamatergic synapse; postsynaptic density, intracellular component
Biological process	central nervous system development; endocytosis; signal transduction; synaptic vesicle uncoating; modulation of excitatory postsynaptic potential; regulation of synaptic vesicle endocytosis; positive regulation of synaptic vesicle endocytosis
Sources:Amigo / QuickGO
Orthologs
Databases	NCBI: entry; OMA: entry
Species	Human	Mouse
Entrez	6455	20405
Ensembl	ENSG00000141985	ENSMUSG00000003200
UniProt	Q99961; Q6FGM0	Q62419
RefSeq (mRNA)	NM_001199943; NM_001199944; NM_003025	NM_001252471; NM_013664; NM_001357649
RefSeq (protein)	NP_001186872; NP_001186873; NP_003016; NP_003016.1	NP_001239400; NP_038692; NP_001344578
Location (UCSC)	Chr 19: 4.36 – 4.4 Mb	Chr 17: 56.32 – 56.34 Mb
PubMed search
- Wikidata
View/Edit Human	View/Edit Mouse

Endophilin-A2 is a protein that in humans is encoded by the SH3GL1 gene.
