= Bridging integrator 2 =

Protein-coding gene in the species Homo sapiens

BIN2

Identifiers
- Aliases: BIN2, BRAP-1, bridging integrator 2
- External IDs: OMIM: 605936; MGI: 3611448; GeneCards: BIN2
Available structures
PDB	Ortholog search: PDBe RCSB
PDB	List of PDB id codes 4AVM, 4I1Q

Gene location (Human)
Chr.	Chromosome 12 (human)
Band	12q13.13	Start	51,281,038 bp
Band	12q13.13	End	51,324,668 bp

Gene location (Mouse)
Chr.	Chromosome 15 (mouse)
Band	15|15 F1	Start	100,538,958 bp
Band	15|15 F1	End	100,567,434 bp
RNA expression pattern
Bgee	Human / Mouse (ortholog); Top expressed in: granulocyte; monocyte; blood; bone marrow cell; spleen; trabecular bone; lymph node; appendix; right lung; upper lobe of left lung / Top expressed in: granulocyte; secondary oocyte; spleen; thymus; primary oocyte; placenta; zygote; bone marrow; yolk sac; testicle; More reference expression data
BioGPS	n/a
Gene ontology
Molecular function	protein binding; phospholipid binding
Cellular component	cytoplasm; podosome; cell junction; plasma membrane; cell projection; cell cortex; phagocytic cup; membrane; extracellular region; secretory granule lumen; ficolin-1-rich granule lumen
Biological process	cell chemotaxis; podosome assembly; phagocytosis, engulfment; plasma membrane tubulation; neutrophil degranulation
Sources:Amigo / QuickGO
Orthologs
Databases	NCBI: entry; OMA: entry
Species	Human	Mouse
Entrez	51411	668218
Ensembl	ENSG00000110934	ENSMUSG00000098112
UniProt	Q9UBW5	D3Z6Q9
RefSeq (mRNA)	NM_001290007; NM_001290008; NM_001290009; NM_016293; NM_001364779 NM_001364780; NM_001364781	NM_001270537; NM_001368666
RefSeq (protein)	NP_001276936; NP_001276937; NP_001276938; NP_057377; NP_001351708 NP_001351709; NP_001351710	n/a
Location (UCSC)	Chr 12: 51.28 – 51.32 Mb	Chr 15: 100.54 – 100.57 Mb
PubMed search
- Wikidata
View/Edit Human	View/Edit Mouse

Bridging integrator 2 is a protein that in humans is encoded by the BIN2 gene.
