= SNX21 =

Protein-coding gene in the species Homo sapiens

Identifiers
- Aliases: SNX21, C20orf161, PP3993, SNX-L, dJ337O18.4, sorting nexin family member 21, SNXL
- External IDs: MGI: 1917729; GeneCards: SNX21

Gene location (Human)
Chr.	Chromosome 20 (human)
Band	20q13.12	Start	45,833,799 bp
Band	20q13.12	End	45,843,276 bp

Gene location (Mouse)
Chr.	Chromosome 2 (mouse)
Band	2|2 H3	Start	164,627,743 bp
Band	2|2 H3	End	164,635,736 bp
RNA expression pattern
Bgee	Human / Mouse (ortholog); Top expressed in: skin of leg; right ovary; left ovary; skin of abdomen; right coronary artery; endothelial cell; right adrenal cortex; gastric mucosa; left adrenal cortex; left uterine tube / Top expressed in: muscle of thigh; Rostral migratory stream; lip; lumbar spinal ganglion; superior frontal gyrus; primary visual cortex; facial motor nucleus; right kidney; cerebellar cortex; neural layer of retina; More reference expression data
BioGPS	n/a
Gene ontology
Molecular function	lipid binding; phosphatidylinositol binding; phosphatidylinositol-4,5-bisphosphate binding; phosphatidylinositol-3-phosphate binding
Cellular component	membrane; cytoplasmic vesicle; cytoplasmic vesicle membrane; endosome; early endosome membrane
Biological process	protein transport
Sources:Amigo / QuickGO
Orthologs
Databases	NCBI: entry; OMA: entry
Species	Human	Mouse
Entrez	90203	101113
Ensembl	ENSG00000124104	ENSMUSG00000050373
UniProt	Q969T3	Q3UR97
RefSeq (mRNA)	NM_001042632; NM_001042633; NM_033421; NM_152897	NM_133924; NM_001399716
RefSeq (protein)	NP_001036097; NP_001036098; NP_219489; NP_690857	NP_598685; NP_001386645
Location (UCSC)	Chr 20: 45.83 – 45.84 Mb	Chr 2: 164.63 – 164.64 Mb
PubMed search
- Wikidata
View/Edit Human	View/Edit Mouse

Sorting nexin-21 is a protein that in humans is encoded by the SNX21 gene.

This gene encodes a member of the sorting nexin family. Members of this family contain a phox (PX) domain, which is a phosphoinositide binding domain, and are involved in intracellular trafficking. This protein does not contain a coiled coil region, like some family members. The specific function of this protein has not been determined. Multiple transcript variants encoding distinct isoforms have been identified for this gene.
