= NOXO1 =

Protein-coding gene in the species Homo sapiens

Identifiers
- Aliases: NOXO1, P41NOX, P41NOXA, P41NOXB, P41NOXC, SH3PXD5, SNX28, NADPH oxidase organizer 1
- External IDs: OMIM: 611256; MGI: 1919143; GeneCards: NOXO1
Available structures
PDB	Ortholog search: PDBe RCSB
PDB	List of PDB id codes 2L73

Gene location (Human)
Chr.	Chromosome 16 (human)
Band	16p13.3	Start	1,978,917 bp
Band	16p13.3	End	1,984,192 bp

Gene location (Mouse)
Chr.	Chromosome 17 (mouse)
Band	17 A3.3|17 12.49 cM	Start	24,915,208 bp
Band	17 A3.3|17 12.49 cM	End	24,919,503 bp
RNA expression pattern
Bgee	Human / Mouse (ortholog); Top expressed in: mucosa of transverse colon; gonad; testicle; rectum; appendix; olfactory zone of nasal mucosa; right hemisphere of cerebellum; mucosa of sigmoid colon; right lobe of liver; left testis / Top expressed in: Paneth cell; crypt of lieberkuhn of small intestine; spermatocyte; large intestine; colon; left colon; ileum; spermatid; jejunum; intestinal villus; More reference expression data
BioGPS	n/a
Gene ontology
Molecular function	enzyme binding; superoxide-generating NADPH oxidase activator activity; protein binding; phospholipid binding; identical protein binding; lipid binding; phosphatidylinositol binding
Cellular component	plasma membrane; NADPH oxidase complex; membrane; intracellular anatomical structure
Biological process	regulation of respiratory burst; extracellular matrix disassembly; positive regulation of catalytic activity; regulation of hydrogen peroxide metabolic process; superoxide metabolic process
Sources:Amigo / QuickGO
Orthologs
Databases	NCBI: entry; OMA: entry
Species	Human	Mouse
Entrez	124056	71893
Ensembl	ENSG00000196408	ENSMUSG00000019320
UniProt	Q8NFA2	Q8VCM2
RefSeq (mRNA)	NM_001267721; NM_144603; NM_172167; NM_172168	NM_027988; NM_001357836
RefSeq (protein)	NP_001254650; NP_653204; NP_751907; NP_751908	NP_082264; NP_001344765
Location (UCSC)	Chr 16: 1.98 – 1.98 Mb	Chr 17: 24.92 – 24.92 Mb
PubMed search
- Wikidata
View/Edit Human	View/Edit Mouse

NADPH oxidase organizer 1 is an enzyme that in humans is encoded by the NOXO1 gene.
