= SH3GL2 =

Protein-coding gene in the species Homo sapiens

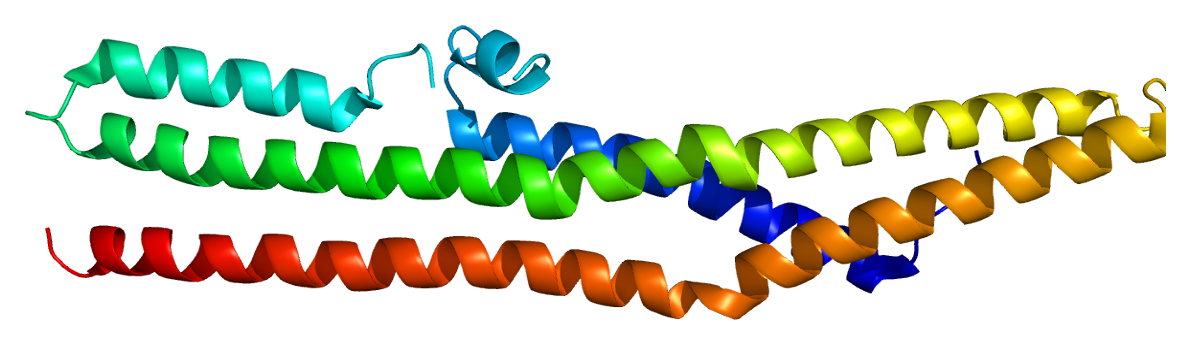

Identifiers
- Aliases: SH3GL2, CNSA2, EEN-B1, SH3D2A, SH3P4, SH3 domain containing GRB2 like 2, endophilin A1
- External IDs: OMIM: 604465; MGI: 700009; GeneCards: SH3GL2
Available structures
PDB	Ortholog search: PDBe RCSB
PDB	List of PDB id codes 1X03, 1X04, 2D4C, 2DBM

Gene location (Human)
Chr.	Chromosome 9 (human)
Band	9p22.2	Start	17,579,066 bp
Band	9p22.2	End	17,797,124 bp

Gene location (Mouse)
Chr.	Chromosome 4 (mouse)
Band	4 C4|4 40.23 cM	Start	85,123,363 bp
Band	4 C4|4 40.23 cM	End	85,557,432 bp
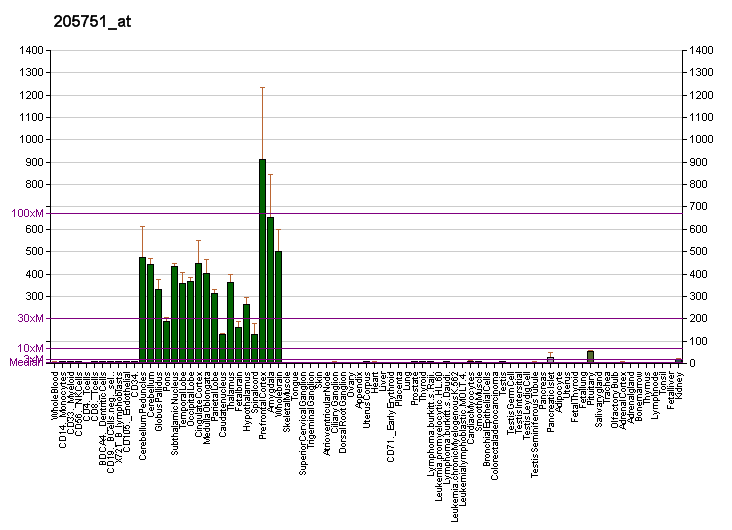
RNA expression pattern
Bgee	Human / Mouse (ortholog); Top expressed in: Brodmann area 23; middle temporal gyrus; endothelial cell; cerebellar cortex; cerebellar hemisphere; right hemisphere of cerebellum; cerebellar vermis; primary visual cortex; lateral nuclear group of thalamus; orbitofrontal cortex / Top expressed in: transitional epithelium of urinary bladder; lobe of cerebellum; cerebellar vermis; pontine nuclei; subiculum; habenula; deep cerebellar nuclei; medial vestibular nucleus; motor neuron; medial dorsal nucleus; More reference expression data
BioGPS	More reference expression data
Gene ontology
Molecular function	protein binding; lipid binding; identical protein binding; protein homodimerization activity; protein C-terminus binding; protein kinase binding
Cellular component	cytoplasm; clathrin-coated endocytic vesicle membrane; membrane; Golgi membrane; plasma membrane; synapse; early endosome; endosome; cytosol; soma; perinuclear region of cytoplasm; basal dendrite; presynapse; synaptic vesicle membrane; photoreceptor ribbon synapse; Schaffer collateral - CA1 synapse; hippocampal mossy fiber to CA3 synapse; glutamatergic synapse; presynaptic cytosol
Biological process	negative regulation of epidermal growth factor receptor signaling pathway; endocytosis; antigen processing and presentation of exogenous peptide antigen via MHC class II; central nervous system development; synaptic vesicle endocytosis; regulation of receptor internalization; signal transduction; membrane organization; synaptic vesicle uncoating; neuron projection development; dendrite extension; cellular response to brain-derived neurotrophic factor stimulus; lipid tube assembly; membrane tubulation; membrane bending; vesicle scission; positive regulation of membrane tubulation; regulation of clathrin-dependent endocytosis
Sources:Amigo / QuickGO
Orthologs
Databases	NCBI: entry; OMA: entry
Species	Human	Mouse
Entrez	6456	20404
Ensembl	ENSG00000107295	ENSMUSG00000028488
UniProt	Q99962	Q62420
RefSeq (mRNA)	NM_003026	NM_019535
RefSeq (protein)	NP_003017	NP_062408
Location (UCSC)	Chr 9: 17.58 – 17.8 Mb	Chr 4: 85.12 – 85.56 Mb
PubMed search
- Wikidata
View/Edit Human	View/Edit Mouse

Endophilin-A1 is a protein that in humans is encoded by the SH3GL2 gene.

== Interactions ==
SH3GL2 has been shown to interact with DNM1, Amphiphysin, ADAM9, SH3KBP1 and ADAM15.
