= SNAG1 =

Protein-coding gene in the species Homo sapiens

SNX18

Identifiers
- Aliases: SNX18, SH3PX2, SH3PXD3B, SNAG1, sorting nexin 18
- External IDs: MGI: 2137642; GeneCards: SNX18

Gene location (Human)
| Chr. | Chromosome 5 (human) |
| Band | 5q11.2 | Start | 54,517,759 bp |
| Band | 5q11.2 | End | 54,546,586 bp |

Gene location (Mouse)
| Chr. | Chromosome 13 (mouse) |
| Band | 13|13 D2.2 | Start | 113,728,715 bp |
| Band | 13|13 D2.2 | End | 113,755,100 bp |
RNA expression pattern
| Bgee | Human / Mouse (ortholog); Top expressed in: pancreatic epithelial cell; pancreatic ductal cell; skin of arm; germinal epithelium; amniotic fluid; palpebral conjunctiva; endothelial cell; synovial membrane; saphenous vein; trabecular bone / Top expressed in: cumulus cell; medullary collecting duct; ascending aorta; external carotid artery; renal corpuscle; aortic valve; tunica media of zone of aorta; internal carotid artery; secondary oocyte; sciatic nerve; More reference expression data |
| BioGPS | n/a |
Gene ontology
| Molecular function | protein binding; phosphatidylinositol binding; phosphatidylinositol-4,5-bisphosphate binding; lipid binding |
| Cellular component | membrane; extrinsic component of cytoplasmic side of plasma membrane; plasma membrane; endosome membrane; extracellular exosome; cytoplasmic vesicle membrane; endomembrane system; clathrin-coated vesicle; cytoplasmic vesicle; endosome |
| Biological process | cleavage furrow formation; cell division; endosomal transport; positive regulation of GTPase activity; protein transport; cell cycle; endocytosis; mitotic cytokinesis; mitotic cell cycle; transport |
Sources:Amigo / QuickGO
Orthologs
| Databases | NCBI: entry; OMA: entry |
| Species | Human | Mouse |
| Entrez | 112574 | 170625 |
| Ensembl | ENSG00000178996 | ENSMUSG00000042364 |
| UniProt | Q96RF0 | Q91ZR2; Q8C788 |
| RefSeq (mRNA) | NM_052870; NM_001102575; NM_001145427 | NM_130796 |
| RefSeq (protein) | NP_001096045; NP_001138899; NP_443102 | NP_570614 |
| Location (UCSC) | Chr 5: 54.52 – 54.55 Mb | Chr 13: 113.73 – 113.76 Mb |
| PubMed search |
- Wikidata
| View/Edit Human | View/Edit Mouse |

Sorting nexin-18 is a protein that in humans is encoded by the SNX18 gene.

This gene encodes a member of the sorting nexin family. Members of this family contain a phox (PX) domain, which is a phosphoinositide binding domain, and are involved in intracellular trafficking. This protein does not contain a coiled coil region, like some family members, but contains a SH3 domain. The specific function of this protein has not been determined.
