= SNX9 =

Protein-coding gene in the species Homo sapiens

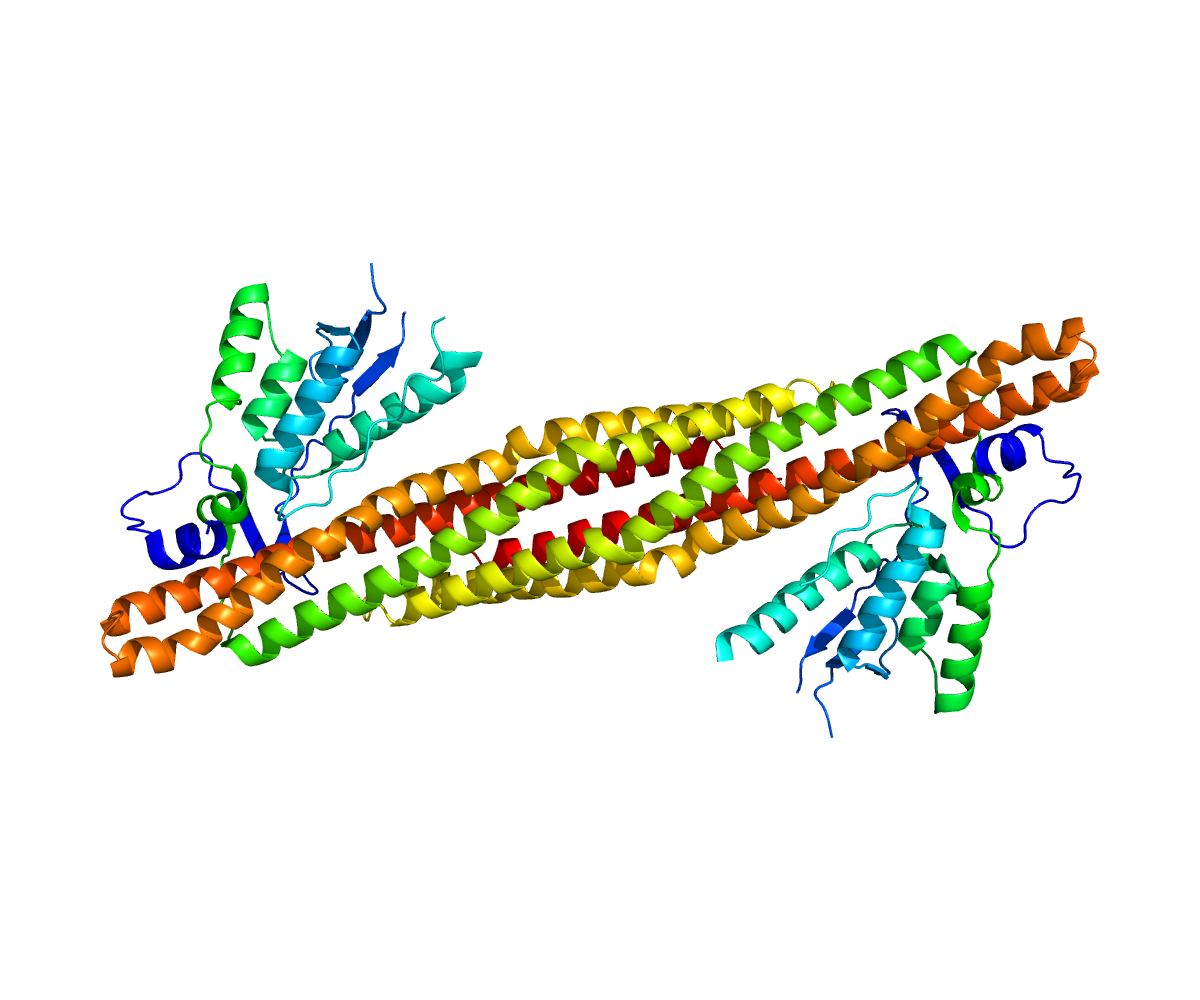

Identifiers
- Aliases: SNX9, SDP1, SH3PX1, SH3PXD3A, WISP, sorting nexin 9
- External IDs: OMIM: 605952; MGI: 1913866; GeneCards: SNX9
Available structures
| PDB | Ortholog search: PDBe RCSB |
| PDB | List of PDB id codes 2RAI, 2RAJ, 2RAK, 3DYT, 3DYU, 3LGE |

Gene location (Human)
| Chr. | Chromosome 6 (human) |
| Band | 6q25.3 | Start | 157,700,387 bp |
| Band | 6q25.3 | End | 157,945,077 bp |

Gene location (Mouse)
| Chr. | Chromosome 17 (mouse) |
| Band | 17 A1|17 3.51 cM | Start | 5,891,604 bp |
| Band | 17 A1|17 3.51 cM | End | 5,982,229 bp |
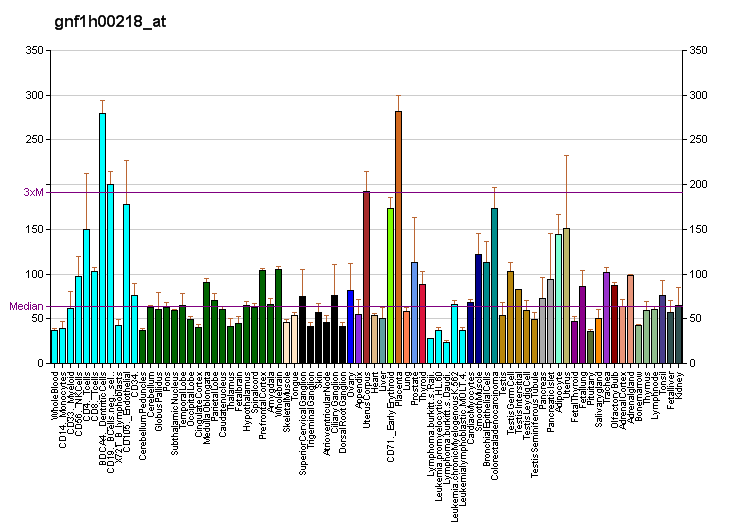
RNA expression pattern
| Bgee | Human / Mouse (ortholog); Top expressed in: cartilage tissue; mucosa of ileum; superficial temporal artery; Achilles tendon; decidua; right coronary artery; tendon of biceps brachii; tail of epididymis; synovial membrane; tibial arteries / Top expressed in: Ileal epithelium; zygote; secondary oocyte; primary oocyte; choroid plexus of fourth ventricle; jejunum; lactiferous gland; duodenum; right kidney; calvaria; More reference expression data |
| BioGPS | More reference expression data |
Gene ontology
| Molecular function | protein homodimerization activity; Arp2/3 complex binding; 1-phosphatidylinositol binding; protein binding; phosphatidylinositol binding; ubiquitin protein ligase binding; lipid binding; cadherin binding; identical protein binding |
| Cellular component | cytoplasm; Golgi apparatus; cell projection; membrane; ruffle; extrinsic component of cytoplasmic side of plasma membrane; plasma membrane; trans-Golgi network; extracellular exosome; cytoplasmic vesicle membrane; clathrin-coated vesicle; cytosol; cytoplasmic vesicle; cuticular plate |
| Biological process | endocytosis; cleavage furrow formation; mitotic cytokinesis; positive regulation of membrane protein ectodomain proteolysis; receptor-mediated endocytosis; plasma membrane tubulation; cell division; endosomal transport; positive regulation of GTPase activity; positive regulation of protein oligomerization; protein transport; lipid tube assembly; cell cycle; intracellular protein transport; positive regulation of protein kinase activity; membrane organization; mitotic cell cycle; transport; positive regulation of actin filament polymerization |
Sources:Amigo / QuickGO
Orthologs
| Databases | NCBI: entry; OMA: entry |
| Species | Human | Mouse |
| Entrez | 51429 | 66616 |
| Ensembl | ENSG00000130340 | ENSMUSG00000002365 |
| UniProt | Q9Y5X1 | Q91VH2 |
| RefSeq (mRNA) | NM_016224 | NM_025664 |
| RefSeq (protein) | NP_057308 | NP_079940 |
| Location (UCSC) | Chr 6: 157.7 – 157.95 Mb | Chr 17: 5.89 – 5.98 Mb |
| PubMed search |
- Wikidata
| View/Edit Human | View/Edit Mouse |

Sorting nexin-9 is a protein that in humans is encoded by the SNX9 gene.

This gene encodes a member of the sorting nexin family. Members of this family contain a phox (PX) domain, which is a phosphoinositide binding domain, and are involved in intracellular trafficking. This protein does not contain a coiled coil region, like some family members, but does contain an SH3 domain near its N-terminus. This protein interacts with the cytoplasmic domains of the precursor but not the processed forms of a disintegrin and metalloprotease domain 9 and 15. This protein binds the beta-appendage domain of adaptor protein 2 and may function to assist adaptor protein 2 in its role at the plasma membrane. This protein interacts with activated Cdc42-associated kinase-2 to regulate the degradation of epidermal growth factor receptor protein.

== Interactions ==
SNX9 has been shown to interact with ADAM9, DNM2 and ADAM15.
