= C11orf42 =

Uncharacterized human protein

Identifiers
- Aliases: C11orf42, chromosome 11 open reading frame 42
- External IDs: MGI: 3643909; GeneCards: C11orf42

Gene location (Human)
| Chr. | Chromosome 11 (human) |
| Band | 11p15.4 | Start | 6,205,557 bp |
| Band | 11p15.4 | End | 6,211,135 bp |

Gene location (Mouse)
| Chr. | Chromosome 7 (mouse) |
| Band | 7|7 E3 | Start | 105,024,245 bp |
| Band | 7|7 E3 | End | 105,027,584 bp |
RNA expression pattern
| Bgee | Human / Mouse (ortholog); Top expressed in: testicle; left testis; right testis; cerebellar hemisphere; right hemisphere of cerebellum; right uterine tube; rectum; apex of heart; mucosa of transverse colon; prefrontal cortex / Top expressed in: testicle; spermatid; embryo; embryo; spermatocyte; secondary oocyte; zygote; blastocyst; adrenal gland; quadriceps femoris muscle; More reference expression data |
| BioGPS | n/a |
Orthologs
| Databases | NCBI: entry; OMA: entry |
| Species | Human | Mouse |
| Entrez | 160298 | 100503879 |
| Ensembl | ENSG00000180878 | ENSMUSG00000078611 |
| UniProt | Q8N5U0 | n/a |
| RefSeq (mRNA) | NM_173525 | NM_001195727; NM_001329995; NM_001382419 |
| RefSeq (protein) | NP_775796 | n/a |
| Location (UCSC) | Chr 11: 6.21 – 6.21 Mb | Chr 7: 105.02 – 105.03 Mb |
| PubMed search |
- Wikidata
| View/Edit Human | View/Edit Mouse |

C11orf42 is an uncharacterized protein in Homo sapiens that is encoded by the C11orf42 gene. It is also known as chromosome 11 open reading frame 42 and uncharacterized protein C11orf42, with no other aliases. The gene is mostly conserved in mammals, but it has also been found in rodents, reptiles, fish and worms.

== Gene ==
=== Location ===
The gene is located on 11p15.4 and has three exons. C11orf42 starts at 6205568 bp and ends at 6211319 bp. C11orf42 spans 5752 base pairs and encodes in the negative strand of chromosome 11.

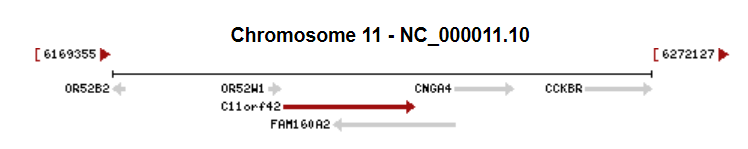

=== Neighborhood ===
On chromosome 11, the genes FAM160A2 (gene) and OR52W1 are neighbors to C11orf42. FAM160A2 encodes in the positive strand of chromosome 11. OR52W1 encodes in the negative strand of chromosome 11.

=== Expression ===
C11orf42 is expressed in a total of seventy-four organs. In a study of ninety-five individuals, twenty-seven different tissues had RNA sequencing completed to determine the tissue-specificity of the protein-coding genes. C11orf42 is expressed in a variety of tissues, although it is most broadly expressed in the skin as well as the testes. According to the EST Profile of C11orf42, the protein is abundant in the bladder, brain, and testis. It was associated with bladder carcinoma and seen in the adult developmental stage.

=== Microarray expression ===
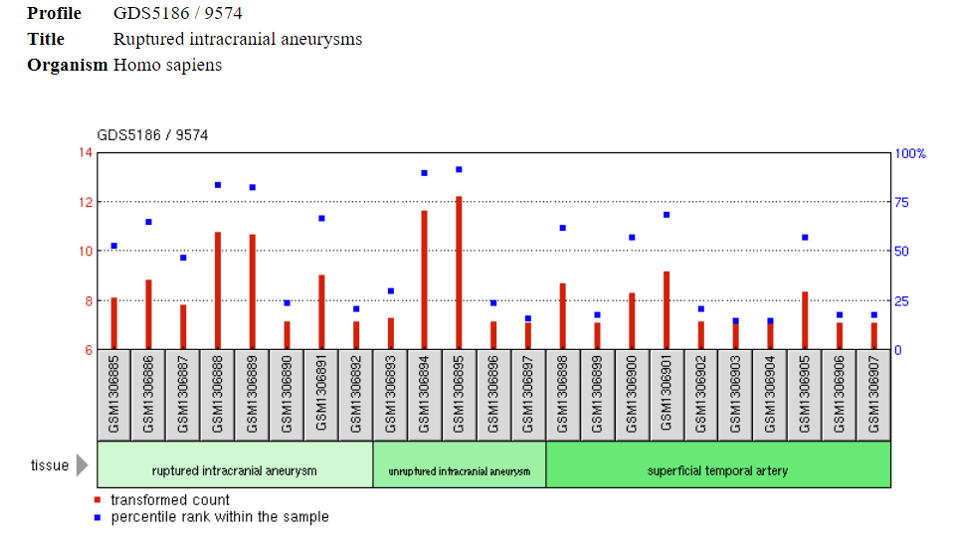
This image shows the expression of C11orf42 for different levels of brain aneurysm. The red columns represent the expression levels and the blue squares represent the percentage ranking of expression for C11orf42 among other genes expressed. The light green represents ruptured aneurysm, the medium green represents the unruptured aneurysm, and the dark green represents the superficial temporal artery.

C11orf42 was observed in a RNA microarray that looked at different levels of intercranial aneurysms in order to see the biological heterogeneity of aneurysms. This was completed by splitting samples into groups with similar gene expressions. It was found that Kruppel-like family of transcription factors (KLF2, KLF12, and KLF15), which were anti-inflammatory regulators, were down-regulated. This family of transcription factors is found in C11orf42 and it appears to have an effect on the development of aneurysm walls as a mechanical strengthener. It was found that in ruptured aneurysms, C11orf42 was ranked at 55.5% among other genes and had an expression level of 8.16. In unruptured aneurysms, C11orf42 had a ranking of 50.4% and an expression level of 9.09. For the superficial temporal artery, the ranking was 35% and the expression level was 7.75. This further supports that C11orf42 has an effect in aneurysms and is involved through transcription in strengthening their walls.

=== Promoter ===
According to the Genomatix program El Dorado, the 5' UTR region is predicted to be 48 base pairs in length while the 3' UTR is 93 base pairs long. Multiple sequence alignments were formed for reach UTR and there were positions found to be conserved over many orthologs. In the 5' UTR, a predicted stem loop region is found at nucleotide positions 9-25 and in the 3' UTR, the predicted stem loop region is found at nucleotide positions 1070-1084 and 1096-1112.

== Transcript ==
=== Isoform ===
C11orf42 has two isoforms known as uncharacterized protein C11orf42 variant X1 and X2. C11orf42 variant X1 is 5629 bp long and has 303 amino acids. C11orf42 variant X2 is 4705 bp long and has 298 amino acids. There wasn't any exons found for either one of the isoforms.

== Protein ==
=== Length ===
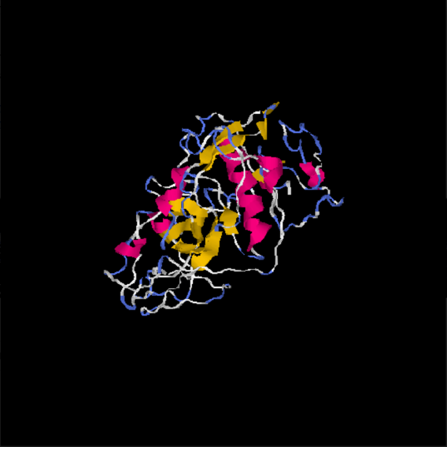
3D image of C11orf42 with alpha helices in pink and beta sheets in yellow.

C11orf42 encodes a protein with a length of 333 amino acids. The protein has a weight of 36.7 kilodaltons and is mostly proline rich. The protein has a composition of 13% alpha helices and 27% beta sheets.

=== Paralogs ===
There are no paralogs found for the C11orf42 protein after using NCBI BLAST.

=== Orthologs ===
| Description | Common name | NCBI Accession ID | Query Cover | E Value | Identity | Date of Divergent (MYA) |
|---|---|---|---|---|---|---|
| Homo sapiens | Human | NP_775796.2 | 100% | 0.0 | 100% | N/A |
| Pan paniscus | Bonobo primate | XP_003819114.1 | 100% | 0.0 | 99.10% | 6.4 |
| Gorilla gorilla gorilla | Western Lowland Gorilla | XP_004050626.2 | 100% | 0.0 | 97.30% | 8.61 |
| Macaca mulatta | Rhesus Monkey | NP_001181413.1 | 100% | 0.0 | 95.20% | 28.10 |
| Cercocebus atys | Sooty Mangabey | XP_011891914.1 | 100% | 0.0 | 94.29% | 28.10 |
| Ochotona princeps | American Pika | XP_004590032.1 | 100% | 0.0 | 91.29% | 88 |
| Ictidomys tridecemlineatus | Thirteen-Lined Ground Squirrel | XP_005341148.1 | 100% | 0.0 | 90.09% | 88 |
| Callorhinus ursinus | Northern Fur Seal | XP_025704267.1 | 100% | 0.0 | 89.79% | 94 |
| Pteropus vampyrus | Large Flying Fox | XP_011383491.1 | 100% | 0.0 | 89.19% | 94 |
| Trichechus manatus latirostris | Florida Manatee | XP_004389128.1 | 100% | 0.0 | 88.29% | 102 |
| Carlito syrichta | Philippine Tarsier | XP_008062834.1 | 100% | 0.0 | 87.09% | 66.7 |
| Hipposideros armiger | Great Roundleaf Bat | XP_019523989.1 | 100% | 0.0 | 86.49% | 94 |
| Cricetulus griseus | Chinese Hamster | RLQ71833.1 | 100% | 0.0 | 85.33% | 88 |
| Manis javanica | Sunda Pangolin | XP_017522375.1 | 100% | 0.0 | 78.38% | 94 |
| Gekko japonicus | Schlegel's Japanese Gecko | XP_015277243.1 | 63% | 1e-61 | 53.08% | 320 |
| Protobothrops mucrosquamatus | Brown Spotted Pitviper | XP_015672776.1 | 99% | 1e-67 | 44.71% | 320 |
| Terrapene mexicana triunguis | Three Toed Box Turtle | XP_026514492.1 | 99% | 3e-53 | 40.30% | 320 |
| Callorhinchus milii | Australian Ghostshark | XP_007899855.1 | 63% | 7e-24 | 35.27% | 465 |
| Oncorhynchus tshawytscha | Chinook Salmon | XP_024270155.1 | 51% | 1e-07 | 32.57% | 432 |
| Saccoglossus kowalevskii | Acorn Worm | XP_006813712.1 | 59% | 2e-04 | 24.53% | 627 |

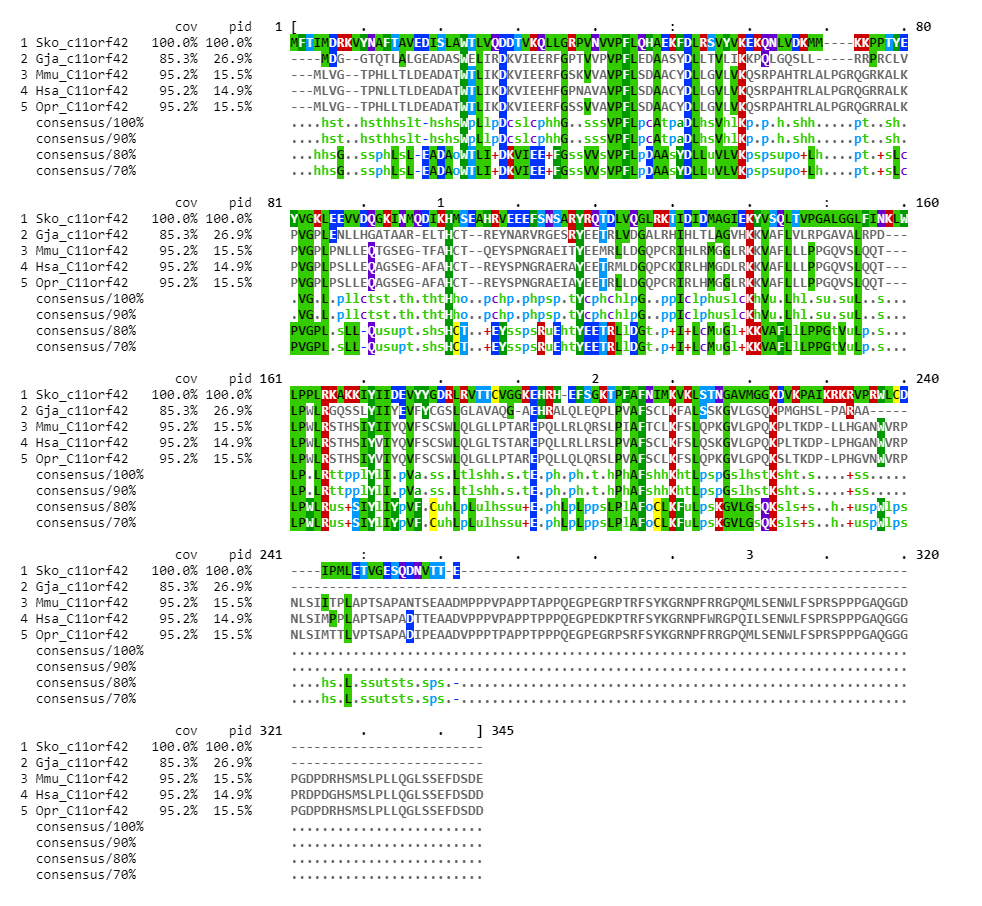
This image shows the multiple sequence alignment of close and distant related orthologs for C11orf42.

=== Conserved domains ===
Gray positions represent the start and stop codons. Red positions show important sites of post translational modifications like glycation, amidation, N-myristoylation, nuclear export signal and O-glycosylation. The blue rectangles represent the domain of unknown function and the black region represents the proline rich region of the protein.

After searching through [NCBI], it was found that C11orf42 only had a domain of unknown function called DUF4463, which is conserved from humans to worms. The DUF4463 ranges from amino acid positions 4-209 and then positions 313-333. PRR stands for proline-rich region and it is located in amino acid positions 210-312.

=== Post translational modifications ===
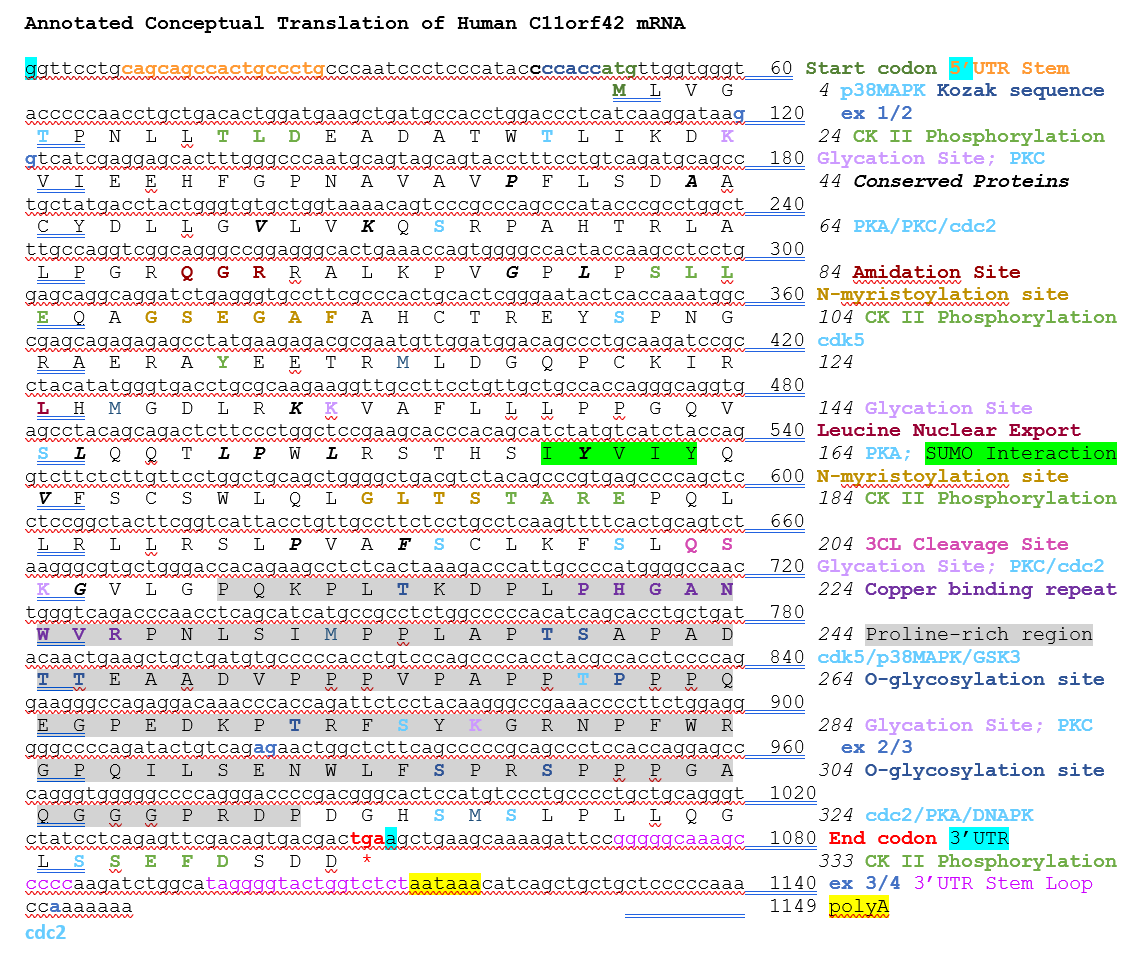
C11orf42 post-translational modifications

C11orf42 is predicted to undergo various types of post translational modifications including Glycation, O-GlcNAc, O-Glycosylation, and Phosphorylation. There was a Leucine Nuclear Export signal found at amino acid position 125.

=== Cellular sub localization ===
C11orf42 was found to be cytoplasmic in its early life within organisms that were not mammals (Schlegel's Japanese Gecko, Acorn Worm) and then it was found to be nuclear localized as it continued to evolve in Mammalia. No signal peptides, mitochondrial targeting sequences or chloroplast peptides were predicted for the protein and therefore not predicted to localize to a secretory pathway, mitochondria, nor chloroplast.

=== Interacting proteins ===
IGLL1, SNX2, and SNX5 were all found to have interacted with C11orf42. IGLL1 had a "textmining" interaction with this gene while SNX2 and SNX5 had physical interactions with this gene.

== Clinical significance ==
As seen above in the microarray expression and the tissue expression, the protein of C11orf42 may have a role in the prevalence of bladder carcinomas as well as brain aneurysms. There was another study that looked at the effect of treatment for rheumatoid arthritis that showed an influence level from C11orf42 as well, indicating that it could affect the medication available for treatment therapies like it did for anti-TNF therapy. More research still needs to be done to confirm if C11orf42 has an effect in other diseases or in the treatment process of diseases.
