= WLS =

WLS may refer to:

== Arts, entertainment, and media ==
- WLS (AM), a radio station in Chicago, Illinois, US
- WLS-FM, a radio station in Chicago, Illinois, US
- WLS-TV, a television station in Chicago, Illinois, US
- DWLS, a radio station in Metro Manila, Philippines

== Biology and healthcare ==
- GPR177, Wntless, or WLS, a human gene
- Weight loss surgery

== Computing and technology ==
- Oracle WebLogic Server, a Java application server
- White light scanner, for measuring surface height
- Wavelength shifter, material that absorbs a wavelength and emits another

== Other uses ==
- Wisconsin Lutheran Seminary, in the United States
- WLS, the Chapman code for Wales
- Weighted least squares, in statistics
- West London Synagogue
- Westchester Library System, New York, United States
- Women's League Soccer (2011–13), a soccer league in the United States
