= Sortilin-related receptor =

Protein-coding gene in the species Homo sapiens

SORL1

Identifiers
- Aliases: SORL1, sortilin-related receptor, L(DLR class) A repeats containing, C11orf32, LR11, LRP9, SORLA, SorLA-1, gp250, sortilin related receptor 1
- External IDs: OMIM: 602005; MGI: 1202296; GeneCards: SORL1
Available structures
PDB	Ortholog search: PDBe RCSB
PDB	List of PDB id codes 2DM4, 3G2S, 3G2T, 3WSX, 3WSY, 3WSZ

Gene location (Human)
Chr.	Chromosome 11 (human)
Band	11q24.1	Start	121,452,314 bp
Band	11q24.1	End	121,633,763 bp

Gene location (Mouse)
Chr.	Chromosome 9 (mouse)
Band	9|9 A5.1	Start	41,876,016 bp
Band	9|9 A5.1	End	42,035,593 bp
RNA expression pattern
Bgee	Human / Mouse (ortholog); Top expressed in: frontal pole; paraflocculus of cerebellum; middle frontal gyrus; inferior ganglion of vagus nerve; Brodmann area 23; middle temporal gyrus; endothelial cell; subthalamic nucleus; Brodmann area 10; postcentral gyrus / Top expressed in: facial motor nucleus; granulocyte; cerebellar vermis; lobe of cerebellum; conjunctival fornix; vestibular membrane of cochlear duct; tibiofemoral joint; transitional epithelium of urinary bladder; medullary collecting duct; deep cerebellar nuclei; More reference expression data
BioGPS	n/a
Gene ontology
Molecular function	amyloid-beta binding; low-density lipoprotein particle binding; protein binding; transmembrane signaling receptor activity
Cellular component	integral component of membrane; recycling endosome; endosome; Golgi apparatus; membrane; Golgi cisterna; integral component of plasma membrane; extracellular region; trans-Golgi network; early endosome; endoplasmic reticulum; low-density lipoprotein particle; nuclear envelope lumen; extracellular exosome; Golgi membrane; extracellular space; endosome membrane
Biological process	negative regulation of tau-protein kinase activity; protein targeting; steroid metabolic process; positive regulation of choline O-acetyltransferase activity; lipid transport; protein targeting to lysosome; negative regulation of neurofibrillary tangle assembly; endocytosis; positive regulation of protein catabolic process; lipid metabolism; negative regulation of amyloid-beta formation; negative regulation of protein oligomerization; negative regulation of neurogenesis; protein maturation; negative regulation of aspartic-type endopeptidase activity involved in amyloid precursor protein catabolic process; cholesterol metabolic process; negative regulation of protein binding; positive regulation of ER to Golgi vesicle-mediated transport; receptor-mediated endocytosis; positive regulation of early endosome to recycling endosome transport; post-Golgi vesicle-mediated transport; negative regulation of MAP kinase activity; positive regulation of endocytic recycling; regulation of smooth muscle cell migration; positive regulation of protein localization to early endosome; transport; negative regulation of metalloendopeptidase activity involved in amyloid precursor protein catabolic process; positive regulation of protein exit from endoplasmic reticulum; protein retention in Golgi apparatus; negative regulation of neuron death; signal transduction
Sources:Amigo / QuickGO
Orthologs
Databases	NCBI: entry; OMA: entry
Species	Human	Mouse
Entrez	6653	20660
Ensembl	ENSG00000137642	ENSMUSG00000049313
UniProt	Q92673	O88307
RefSeq (mRNA)	NM_003105	NM_011436; NM_001357261
RefSeq (protein)	NP_003096	NP_035566; NP_001344190
Location (UCSC)	Chr 11: 121.45 – 121.63 Mb	Chr 9: 41.88 – 42.04 Mb
PubMed search
- Wikidata
View/Edit Human	View/Edit Mouse

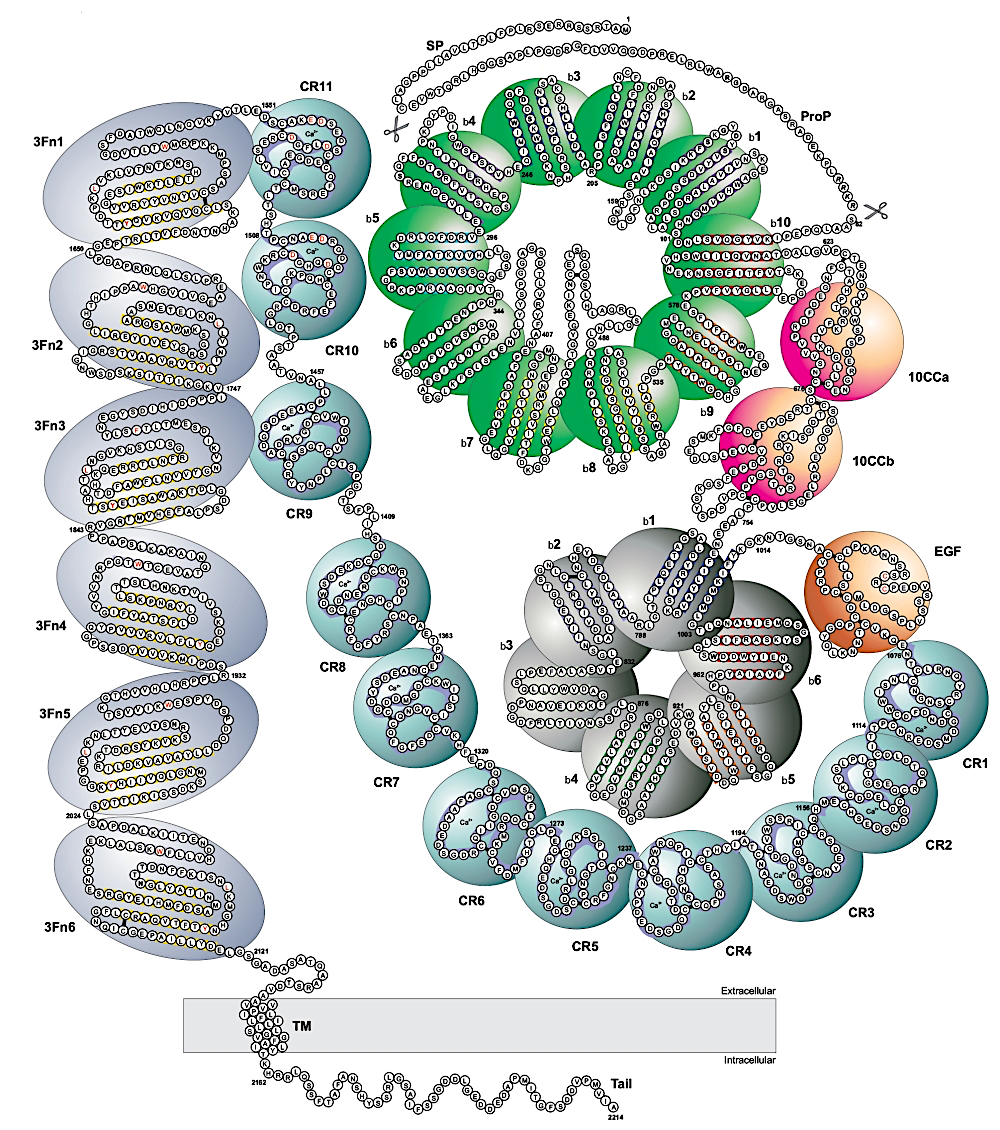
Schematic diagram of the multiple domains of SORLA, the protein product of the SORL1 gene. The relative orientations of the domains are drawn to match the ectodomain model of Jensen et al., PNAS (2023), which is also shown on the next figure. From Holstege et al., medRxiv (2023).

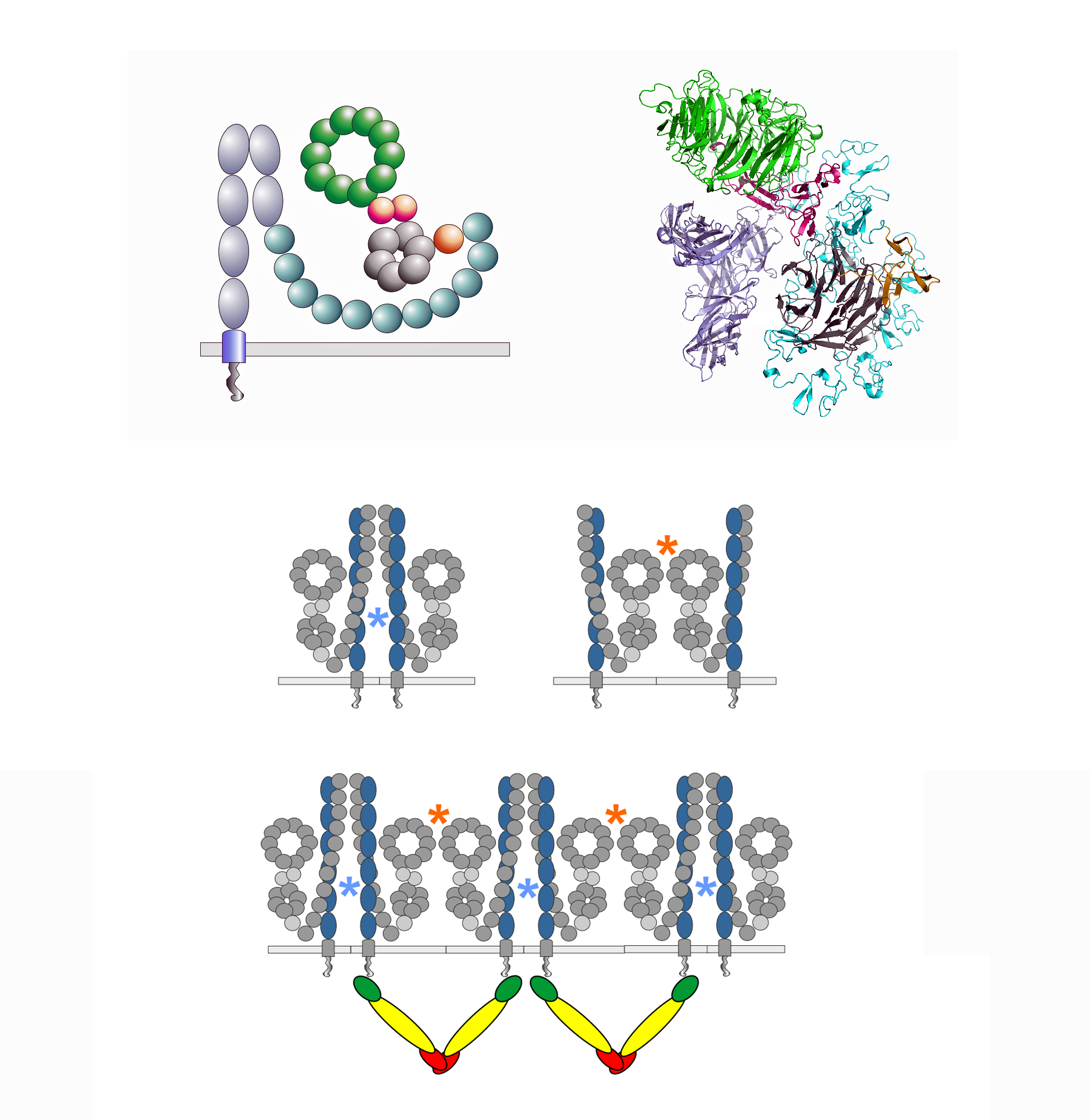
Schematic and structure model of the ectodomain of SORLA/SORL1, plus its two dimer interfaces in the middle panel, followed by the way the two interfaces can combine to form a polymeric network and how that network can underlie and stabilize the network of retromer arches on the other side of the tubular membrane. From Jensen et al., PNAS (2023). Atomic coordinates of the ectodomain model are available at https://modelarchive.org/doi/10.5452/ma-zgbg4

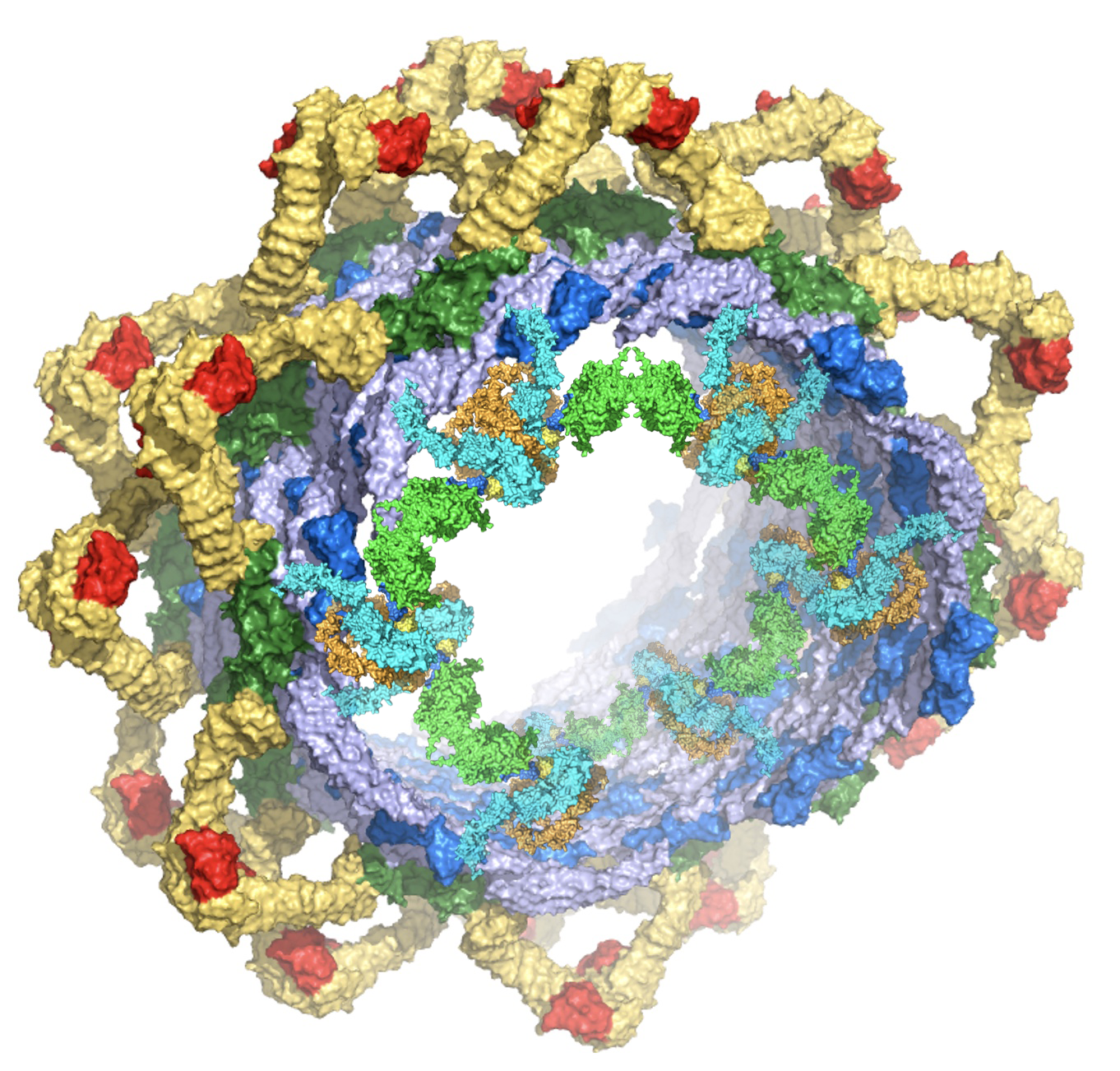
A model of the endosome tubule showing the characteristic retromer arch polymer wrapping around the outer (cytoplasmic) side and the ectodomain of SORL1 forming a supporting polymeric network inside. The interior SORL1 network is anchored to retromer by a transmembrane helix and a short C-terminal domain that binds to VPS26 (dark green) on the outside.

Sortilin-related receptor (SORLA) is a protein that in humans is encoded by the SORL1 gene.

== Structure ==
SORLA, is a 2214 residue type I transmembrane protein.

== Function ==
SORLA a is receptor that binds certain peptides and integral membrane protein cargo in the endolysosomal pathway and delivers them for sorting to the retromer protein complex. SORL1 is predominantly expressed in the central nervous system. Endosomal traffic jams linked to SORL1 retromer dysfunction are the earliest cellular pathology in both familial and the more common sporadic Alzheimer's disease.

Retromer regulates protein trafficking from the early endosome either back to the trans-Golgi (retrograde) or back to the plasma membrane (direct recycling). Two forms of retromer are known: the VPS26A retromer and the VPS26B retromer, the latter being dedicated to direct recycling in the CNS. SORLA is a multi domain single-pass membrane protein whose large ectodomain resides primarily in endosomal tubules, being connected by its transmembrane helical domain and cytoplasmic tail to the VPS26 retromer subunit on the outer endosomal membrane.

== Clinical significance ==
The age at onset of SORL1 mutation carriers varies, which has complicated segregation analyses. Nevertheless, protein−truncating variants are observed almost exclusively in AD patients, indicating that SORL1 is haploinsufficient. Most variants are rare missense variants that can either be benign, or risk−increasing, but studies have indicated that some variants are causative for disease. Specific missense variants have been observed only in AD cases, some of which may have a dominant negative effect.

A significant reduction in SORL1 expression has been found in brain tissue affected by Alzheimer's disease. Protein levels of retromer subunits have also been found to be reduced in the transentorhinal cortex, the brain region where Alzheimer's disease begins. SORL1-VPS26B retromer has been linked with regulation of amyloid precursor protein (APP), faulty processing of which is implicated in Alzheimer's. SORL1 cargo includes APP and its amyloid forming peptide cleavage products, as well as the important glutamate neurotransmitter receptor subunit GRIA1. SORL1 binds these and other cargo proteins and delivers them to the retromer, an assembly of multiple gene products that is the master regulator of protein trafficking from the early endosome. Studies by a group of international researchers support the proposition that SORL1 plays a part in seniors developing Alzheimer's disease, the findings being significant across racial and ethnic strata. SORL1 is now considered the fourth causal Alzheimer's gene, the others being APP and the two presenilins PSEN1 and PSEN2 and it is the only one also genetically linked to the common, late-onset sporadic form of the disease. Defective SORL1-retromer protein recycling has been proposed as the "fire" of sporadic Alzheimer's disease that drives production of amyloid and tau tangle "smoke", thereby resolving the apparent paradoxical failure of treatments aimed at the latter two to completely arrest the disease.
