= Dapolsertib =

Clinical data
- Other names: MEN1703, SEL24-B489

Identifiers
- IUPAC name: 5,6-dibromo-4-nitro-2-piperidin-4-yl-1-propan-2-ylbenzimidazole
- CAS Number: 1616359-00-2
- PubChem CID: 76286825
- IUPHAR/BPS: 13204
- ChemSpider: 81367232
- UNII: 9M7X64VTLI
- ChEMBL: ChEMBL4467168

Chemical and physical data
- Formula: C_{15}H_{18}Br_{2}N_{4}O_{2}
- Molar mass: 446.143 g·mol^{−1}
- 3D model (JSmol): Interactive image
- SMILES: CC(C)N1C2=CC(=C(C(=C2N=C1C3CCNCC3)[N+](=O)[O-])Br)Br
- InChI: InChI=InChI=1S/C15H18Br2N4O2/c1-8(2)20-11-7-10(16)12(17)14(21(22)23)13(11)19-15(20)9-3-5-18-6-4-9/h7-9,18H,3-6H2,1-2H3; Key:UOUBCIJIWDLRGM-UHFFFAOYSA-N

Dapolsertib is an investigational new drug that is being evaluated for the treatment of cancer. It is dual inhibitor of PIM family of serine/threonine protein kinases and mutant forms of FMS-related tyrosine kinase 3 (FLT3) that is being developed by Ryvu Therapeutics SA.
