= Retromer =

Protein complex

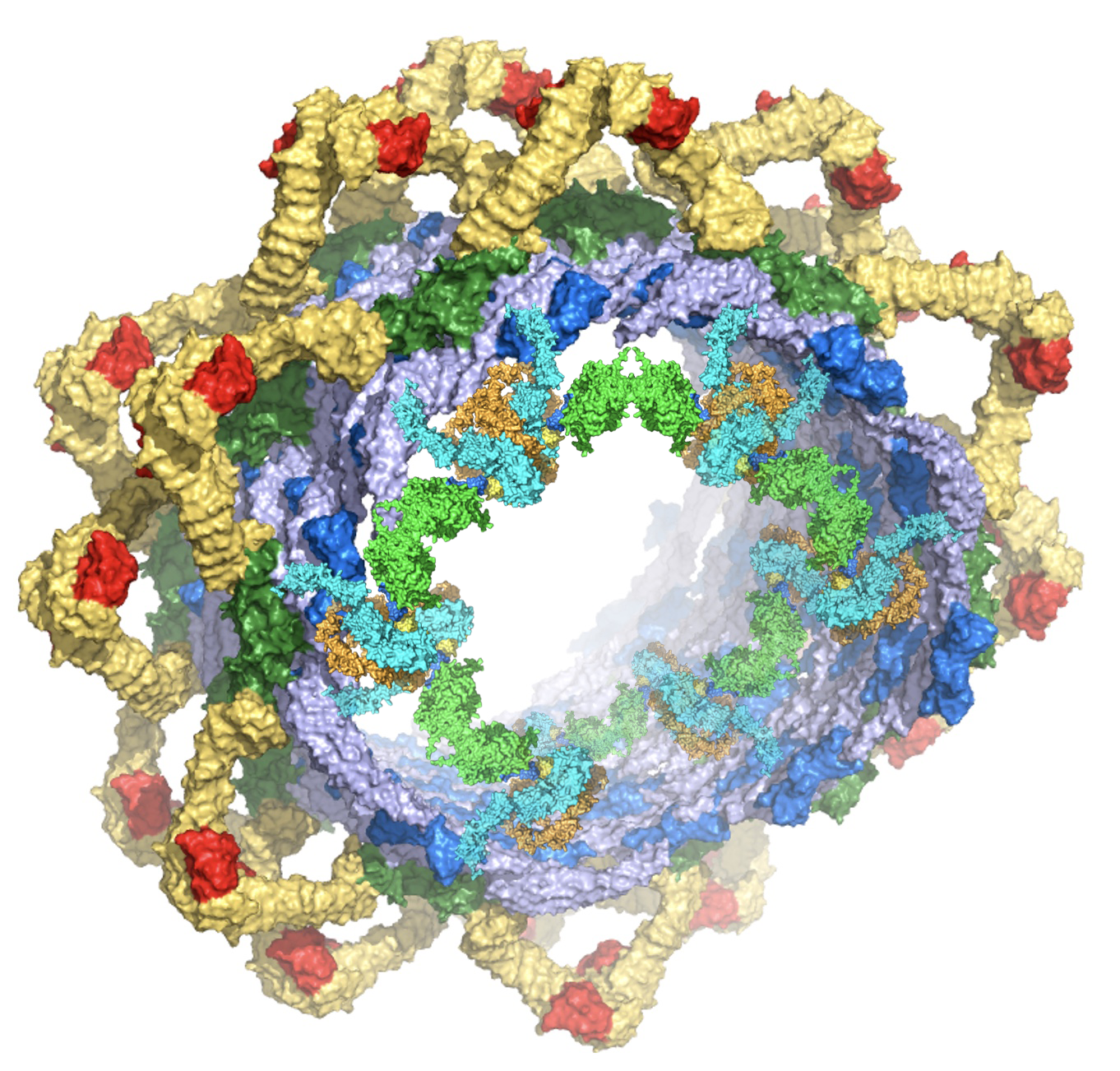
Model of the retromer heteropentameric complex (VPS26 in green; VPS35 in orange, and VPS29 in red). The retromer forms a polymeric network arc on the outside (cytoplasmic side) of the endosome tubule. Inside the tubule, the cargo receptor SORL1, forms its own network and binds protein cargo for trafficking. SORL1 connects to retromer on the outside via a transmembrane helix and a short C-terminal tail that binds VPS26. Model built based on structural data by Brett Collins and Yu Kitago.

Retromer is a complex of proteins that has been shown to be important in recycling transmembrane receptors from endosomes to the trans-Golgi network (TGN) and directly back to the plasma membrane. Mutations in retromer and its associated proteins have been linked to Alzheimer's and Parkinson's diseases.

Retromer is a heteropentameric complex, which in humans is composed of a less defined membrane-associated sorting nexin dimer (SNX1, SNX2, SNX5, SNX6), and a vacuolar protein sorting (Vps) heterotrimer containing Vps26, Vps29, and Vps35. Although the SNX dimer is required for the recruitment of retromer to the endosomal membrane, the cargo binding function of this complex is contributed by the core heterotrimer through the binding of Vps26 and Vps35 subunits to various cargo molecules including M6PR, wntless, SORL1 (which is also a receptor for other cargo proteins such as APP), and sortilin. Early study on sorting of acid hydrolases such as carboxypeptidase Y (CPY) in S. cerevisiae mutants has led to the identification of retromer in mediating the retrograde trafficking of the pro-CPY receptor (Vps10) from the endosomes to the TGN. Age-related loss of OXR1 causes retromer decline.

== Structure ==
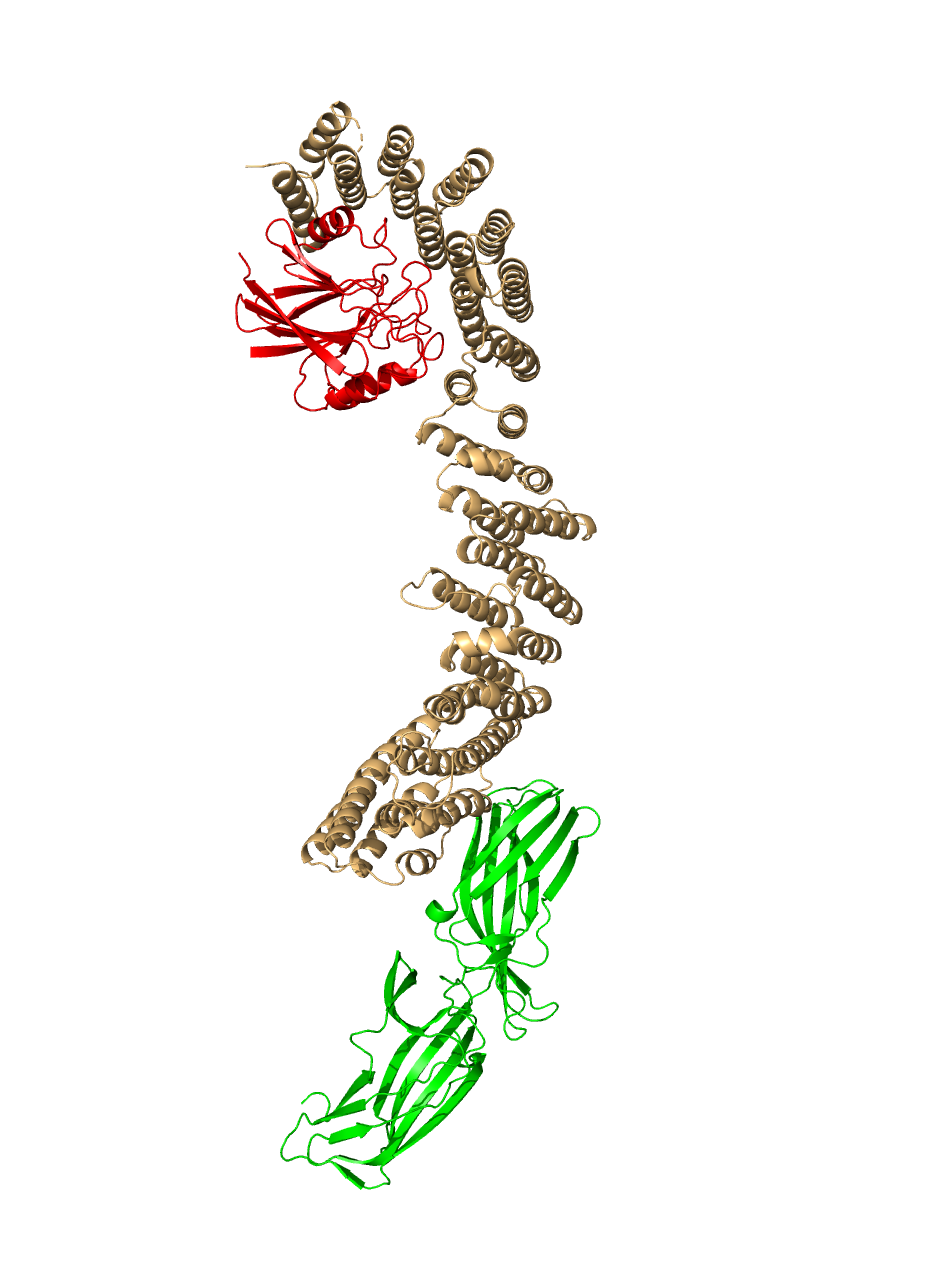
Ribbon diagram of the retromer heterotrimeric complex comprising the proteins VPS26 (green), VPS35 (orange) and VPS29 (red). On the endosomal membrane, this heterotrimer forms an arch-shaped dimer via interaction of two VPS35 molecules (see next image).

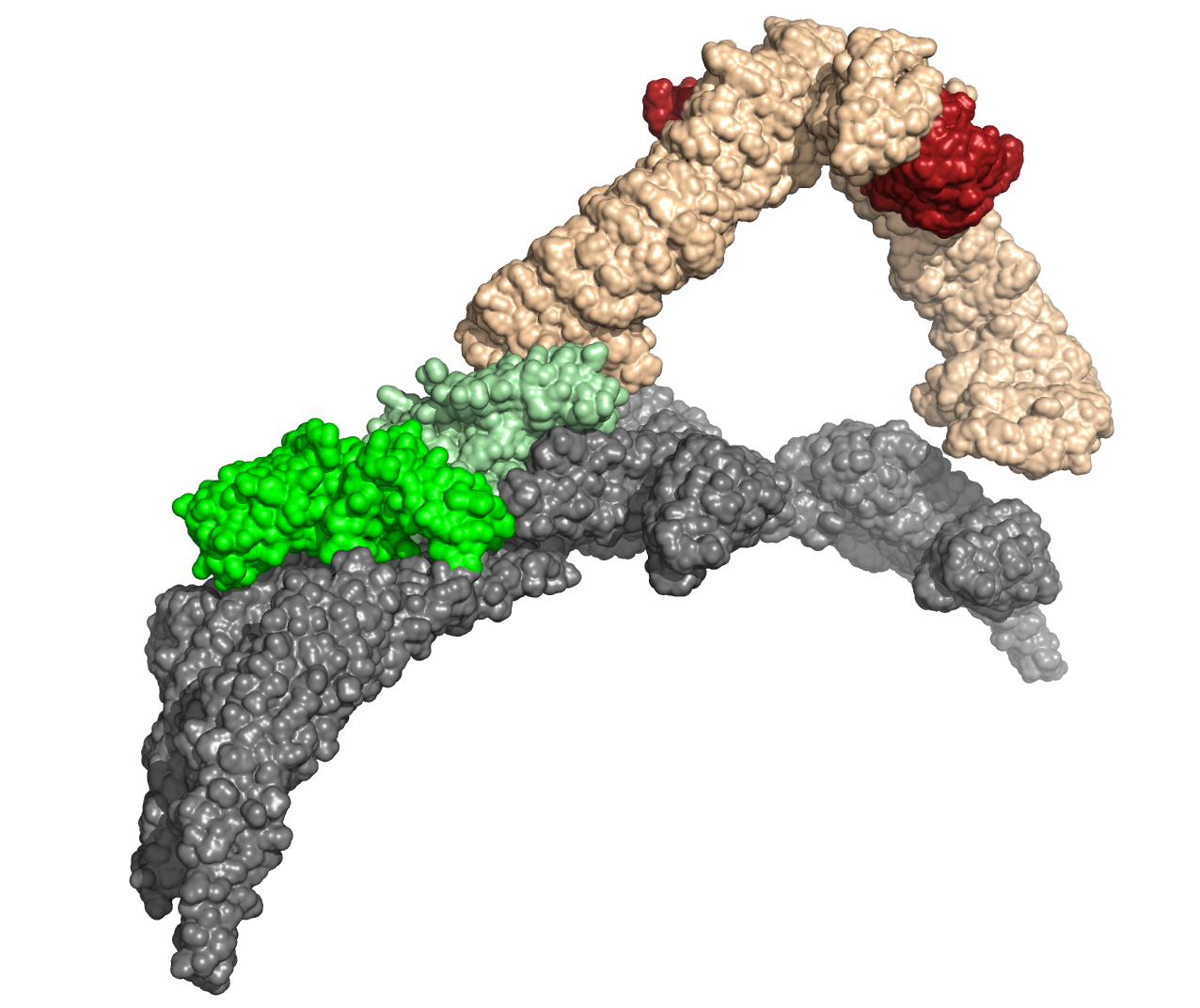
CryoET structure of retromer heterotrimer dimer on the tubular endosome membrane in surface rendering. VPS26 is in green, VPS35 in orange, and VPS29 in red. The heterotrimer forms a characteristic dimeric arch. The grey SNX protein aids in tubulation and retromer membrane binding.

The retromer complex is highly conserved: homologs have been found in C. elegans, mouse and human. The retromer complex consists of 5 proteins in yeast: Vps35p, Vps26p, Vps29p, Vps17p, Vps5p. The mammalian retromer consists of Vps26, Vps29, Vps35, SNX1 and SNX2, and possibly SNX5 and SNX6. It is proposed to act in two subcomplexes: (1) A cargo recognition heterotrimeric complex that consist of Vps35, Vps29 and Vps26, and (2) SNX-BAR dimers, which consist of SNX1 or SNX2 and SNX5 or SNX6 that facilitate endosomal membrane remodulation and curvature, resulting in the formation of tubules/vesicles that transport cargo molecules to the trans-golgi network (TGN). Humans have two orthologs of VPS26: VPS26A, which is ubiquitous, and VPS26B, which is found in the central nervous system, where it forms a unique retromer that is dedicated to direct recycling of neuronal cell surface proteins such as APP back to the plasma membrane with the assistance of the cargo receptor SORL1.

== Function ==
The retromer complex has been shown to mediate retrieval of various transmembrane receptors, such as the cation-independent mannose 6-phosphate receptor, functional mammalian counterparts of Vps10 such as SORL1, and the Wnt receptor Wntless. Retromer is required for the recycling of Kex2p and DPAP-A, which also cycle between the trans-Golgi network and a pre-vacuolar (yeast endosome equivalent) compartment in yeast. It is also required for the recycling of the cell surface receptor CED-1, which is necessary for phagocytosis of apoptotic cells.

Retromer plays a central role in the retrieval of several different cargo proteins from the endosome to the trans-Golgi network, or for direct recycling back to the cell surface. However, it is clear that there are other complexes and proteins that act in this retrieval process. So far it is not clear whether some of the other components that have been identified in the retrieval pathway act with retromer in the same pathway or are involved in alternative pathways. Recent studies have implicated retromer sorting defects in Alzheimer's disease and late-onset Parkinson disease

Retromer also seems to play a role in Hepatitis C Virus replication.

== Retrograde trafficking and direct recycling ==
=== Retrograde trafficking to the trans-Golgi network ===
The association of the Vps35-Vps29-Vps26 complex with the cytosolic domains of cargo molecules on endosomal membranes initiates the activation of retrograde trafficking and cargo capture. The nucleation complex is formed through the interaction of VPS complex with GTP-activated Rab7 with clathrin, clathrin-adaptors and various binding proteins.

The SNX-BAR dimer enters the nucleation complex via direct binding or lateral movement on endosomal surface. The increased level of Retromer SNX-BARs causes a conformational switch to a curvature-inducing mode which initiates membrane tubule formation. Once the cargo carriers are matured, the carrier scission is then catalyzed by dynamin-II or EHD1, together with the mechanical forces generated by actin polymerization and motor activity.

The cargo carrier is transported to the TGN by motor proteins such as dynein. Tethering of the cargo carrier to the recipient compartment is thought to lead to the uncoating of the carrier, which is driven by ATP-hydrolysis and Rab7-GTP hydrolysis. Once released from the carrier, the Vps35-Vps29-Vps26 complex and the SNX-BAR dimers get recycled back onto the endosomal membranes.

=== Direct recycling back to the cell surface ===
The other function of retromer is the recycling of protein cargo directly back to the plasma membrane. Dysfunction of this branch of the retromer recycling pathway causes endosomal protein traffic jams that are linked to Alzheimer's disease. It has been suggested that recycling dysfunction is the "fire" that drives the common form of Alzheimer's, leading to the production of amyloid and tau tangle "smoke".

== See also ==
- SORL1
- VPS26B
- VPS26A
- VPS35
- VPS29
