= SNX6 =

Identifiers
- Aliases: SNX6, MSTP010, TFAF2, sorting nexin 6
- External IDs: OMIM: 606098; MGI: 1919433; GeneCards: SNX6

Gene location (Mouse)
Chr.	Chromosome 12 (mouse)
Band	12|12 C1	Start	54,793,134 bp
Band	12|12 C1	End	54,842,488 bp
RNA expression pattern
Bgee	Human / Mouse (ortholog); Top expressed in: jejunal mucosa; superficial temporal artery; placenta; tibialis anterior muscle; corpus callosum; duodenum; subthalamic nucleus; right ventricle; palpebral conjunctiva; Achilles tendon / Top expressed in: epithelium of stomach; Rostral migratory stream; Gonadal ridge; dermis; morula; morula; right kidney; genital tubercle; stroma of bone marrow; proximal tubule; More reference expression data
BioGPS	n/a
Gene ontology
Molecular function	dynactin binding; protein homodimerization activity; protein binding; phosphatidylinositol binding; protein heterodimerization activity; lipid binding; type I transforming growth factor beta receptor binding
Cellular component	cytoplasm; endosome; early endosome membrane; retromer, tubulation complex; membrane; intracellular anatomical structure; tubular endosome; retromer complex; early endosome; cytoplasmic vesicle; nucleus; extrinsic component of membrane; cytosol; lysosome
Biological process	endocytosis; vesicle organization; negative regulation of transforming growth factor beta receptor signaling pathway; negative regulation of epidermal growth factor-activated receptor activity; retrograde transport, endosome to Golgi; protein transport; intracellular protein transport; negative regulation of transcription, DNA-templated; regulation of macroautophagy; regulation of histamine secretion by mast cell; negative regulation of neuron apoptotic process; cellular response to amyloid-beta; cellular response to epidermal growth factor stimulus
Sources:Amigo / QuickGO
Orthologs
Databases	NCBI: entry
Species	Human	Mouse
Entrez	58533	72183
Ensembl	n/a	ENSMUSG00000005656
UniProt	Q9UNH7	Q6P8X1
RefSeq (mRNA)	NM_021249; NM_152233; NM_001366519	NM_026998
RefSeq (protein)	NP_067072; NP_689419; NP_001353448; NP_689419.2	NP_081274
Location (UCSC)	n/a	Chr 12: 54.79 – 54.84 Mb
PubMed search
- Wikidata
View/Edit Human	View/Edit Mouse

Sorting Nexin 6 also known as SNX6 is a well-conserved membrane-associated protein belonging to the sorting nexin family that is a component of the retromer complex. The protein contains a coiled-coil domain at its C terminus and a PX domain at its N terminus. Binding to PIM1 causes translocation to the nucleus. SNX6 has been shown to associate with TRAF4.
