= VPS29 =

Protein-coding gene in the species Homo sapiens

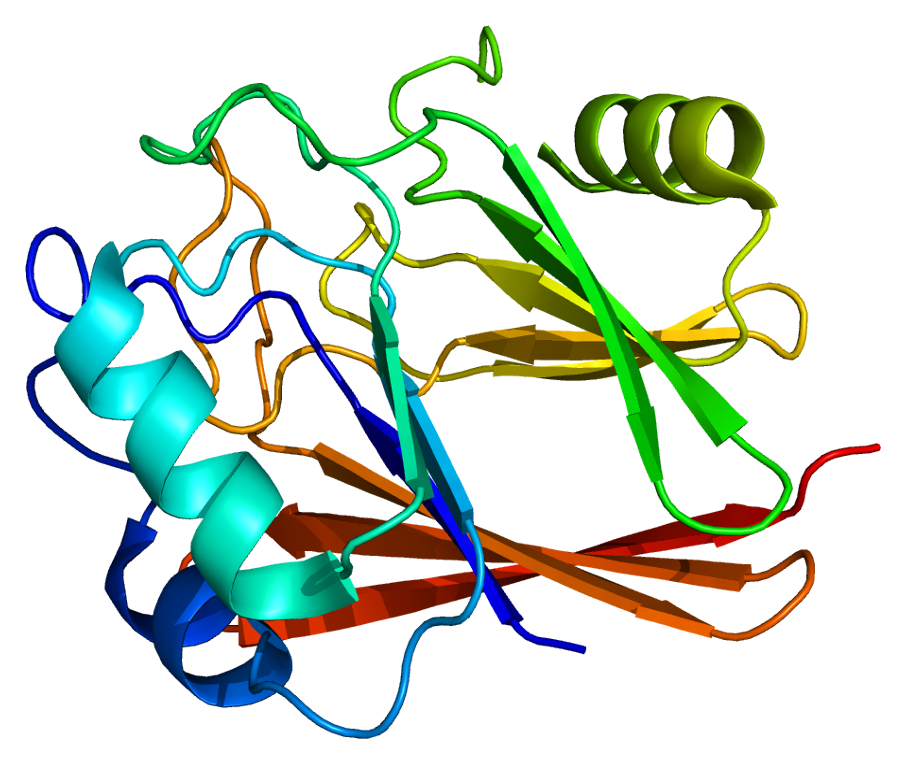
Available structures
PDB	Ortholog search: PDBe RCSB
PDB	List of PDB id codes 1W24, 2R17

Identifiers
- Aliases: VPS29, DC15, PEP11, DC7, VPS29 retromer complex component, retromer complex component
- External IDs: OMIM: 606932; MGI: 1928344; HomoloGene: 9433; GeneCards: VPS29; OMA:VPS29 - orthologs

Gene location (Human)
Chr.	Chromosome 12 (human)
Band	12q24.11	Start	110,491,083 bp
Band	12q24.11	End	110,502,111 bp

Gene location (Mouse)
Chr.	Chromosome 5 (mouse)
Band	5|5 F	Start	122,492,432 bp
Band	5|5 F	End	122,503,047 bp
RNA expression pattern
Bgee	Human / Mouse (ortholog); Top expressed in: monocyte; tibialis anterior muscle; mucosa of ileum; smooth muscle tissue; myocardium of left ventricle; gastric mucosa; rectum; cardiac muscle tissue of right atrium; right coronary artery; tibial arteries / Top expressed in: otic placode; facial motor nucleus; saccule; barrel cortex; yolk sac; endocardial cushion; endothelial cell of lymphatic vessel; atrioventricular valve; anterior horn of spinal cord; nucleus accumbens; More reference expression data
BioGPS	n/a
Gene ontology
Molecular function	protein binding; metal ion binding; zinc ion binding
Cellular component	late endosome; early endosome; endosome membrane; membrane; intracellular membrane-bounded organelle; cytoplasm; cytosol; retromer complex; retromer, cargo-selective complex; endosome
Biological process	protein transport; Wnt signaling pathway; regulation of autophagy; intracellular protein transport; retrograde transport, endosome to Golgi; viral process; endocytic recycling
Sources:Amigo / QuickGO
Orthologs
Species	Human	Mouse
Entrez	51699	56433
Ensembl	ENSG00000111237	ENSMUSG00000029462
UniProt	Q9UBQ0; Q05DG7	Q9QZ88
RefSeq (mRNA)	NM_001282150; NM_001282151; NM_016226; NM_057180	NM_019780; NM_001347453; NM_001359226
RefSeq (protein)	NP_001269079; NP_001269080; NP_057310; NP_476528	NP_001334382; NP_062754; NP_001346155
Location (UCSC)	Chr 12: 110.49 – 110.5 Mb	Chr 5: 122.49 – 122.5 Mb
PubMed search
- Wikidata
View/Edit Human	View/Edit Mouse

VPS29 is a human gene coding for the vacuolar protein sorting protein Vps29, a component of the retromer complex.

== Yeast homolog ==
The homologous protein (one that performs the same function) in yeast is Vacuolar protein sorting 29 homolog (S. cerevisiae).

== Function ==
VPS29 belongs to a group of genes coding for vacuolar protein sorting (VPS) proteins that, when functionally impaired, disrupt the efficient delivery of vacuolar hydrolases. The protein encoded by this gene, Vps29, is a component of a large multimeric complex, termed the retromer complex, which is involved in retrograde transport of proteins from endosomes to the trans-Golgi network. Vps29 may be involved in the formation of the inner shell of the retromer coat for retrograde vesicles leaving the prevacuolar compartment. Alternative splice variants encoding different isoforms, and usage of multiple polyadenylation sites have been found for this gene.
