= VPS26A =

Protein-coding gene in the species Homo sapiens

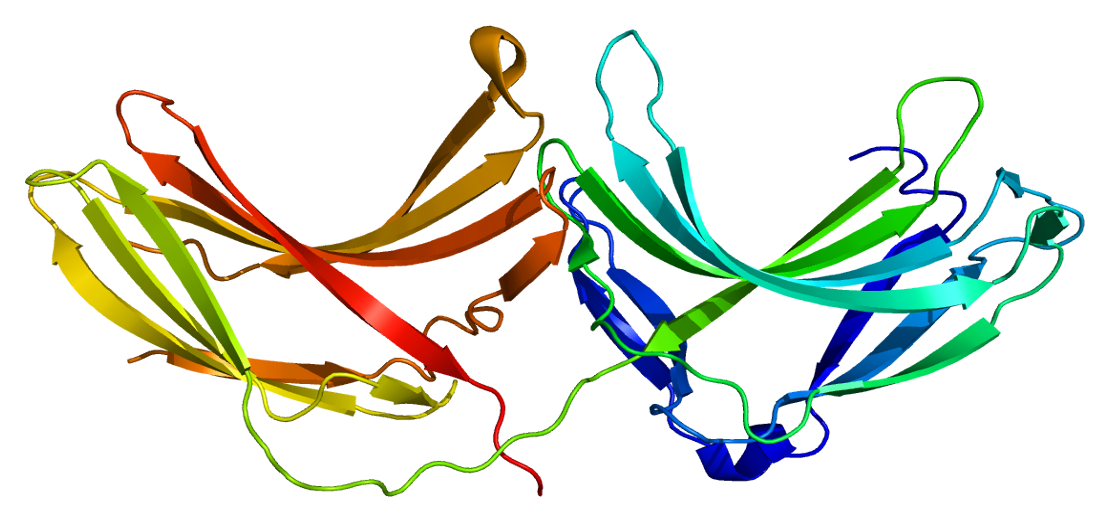
Available structures
| PDB | Ortholog search: PDBe RCSB |
| PDB | List of PDB id codes 2FAU |

Identifiers
- Aliases: VPS26A, HB58, Hbeta58, PEP8A, VPS26, VPS26 retromer complex component A, VPS26, retromer complex component A
- External IDs: OMIM: 605506; MGI: 1353654; HomoloGene: 68420; GeneCards: VPS26A; OMA:VPS26A - orthologs

Gene location (Human)
| Chr. | Chromosome 10 (human) |
| Band | 10q22.1 | Start | 69,123,512 bp |
| Band | 10q22.1 | End | 69,174,412 bp |

Gene location (Mouse)
| Chr. | Chromosome 10 (mouse) |
| Band | 10|10 B4 | Start | 62,291,014 bp |
| Band | 10|10 B4 | End | 62,322,584 bp |
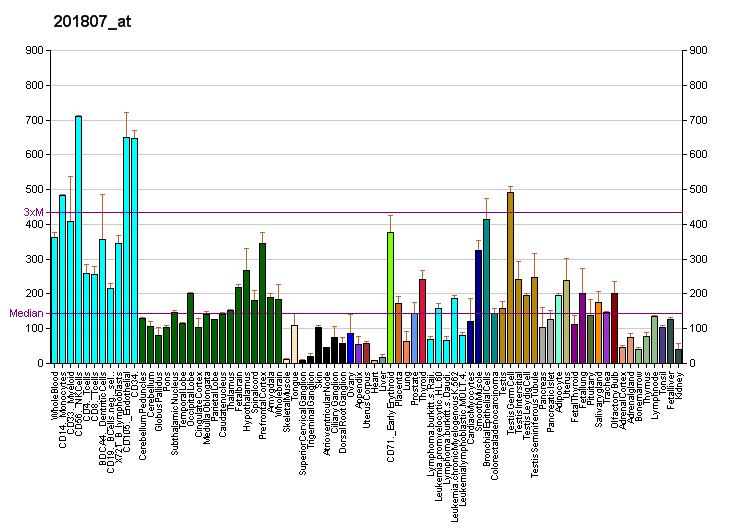
RNA expression pattern
| Bgee | Human / Mouse (ortholog); Top expressed in: parietal pleura; parotid gland; visceral pleura; germinal epithelium; skin of thigh; skin of hip; endothelial cell; mucosa of sigmoid colon; oral cavity; tail of epididymis / Top expressed in: spermatocyte; spermatid; zygote; primary oocyte; seminiferous tubule; cumulus cell; yolk sac; secondary oocyte; stroma of bone marrow; decidua; More reference expression data |
| BioGPS | More reference expression data |
Gene ontology
| Molecular function | protein binding |
| Cellular component | cytoplasm; tubular endosome; retromer complex; vesicle; endosome; early endosome; membrane; lysosome; endosome membrane; retromer, cargo-selective complex; cytosol |
| Biological process | protein transport; retrograde transport, endosome to Golgi; regulation of macroautophagy; intracellular protein transport; Wnt signaling pathway; signal transduction |
Sources:Amigo / QuickGO
Orthologs
| Species | Human | Mouse |
| Entrez | 9559 | 30930 |
| Ensembl | ENSG00000122958 | ENSMUSG00000020078 |
| UniProt | O75436 | P40336 |
| RefSeq (mRNA) | NM_001035260; NM_004896; NM_001318944; NM_001318945; NM_001318946 | NM_001113355; NM_133672; NM_001358543 |
| RefSeq (protein) | NP_001030337; NP_001305873; NP_001305874; NP_001305875; NP_004887 | NP_001106826; NP_598433; NP_001345472 |
| Location (UCSC) | Chr 10: 69.12 – 69.17 Mb | Chr 10: 62.29 – 62.32 Mb |
| PubMed search |
- Wikidata
| View/Edit Human | View/Edit Mouse |

Vacuolar protein sorting-associated protein 26A is a protein that in humans is encoded by the VPS26A gene.

This gene belongs to a group of vacuolar protein sorting (VPS) genes. The encoded protein is a component of a large multimeric complex, termed the retromer complex, involved in retrograde transport of proteins from endosomes to the trans-Golgi network. The close structural similarity between the yeast and human proteins that make up this complex suggests a similarity in function. Expression studies in yeast and mammalian cells indicate that this protein interacts directly with VPS35, which serves as the core of the retromer complex. Alternative splicing results in multiple transcript variants encoding different isoforms.

== Structure ==
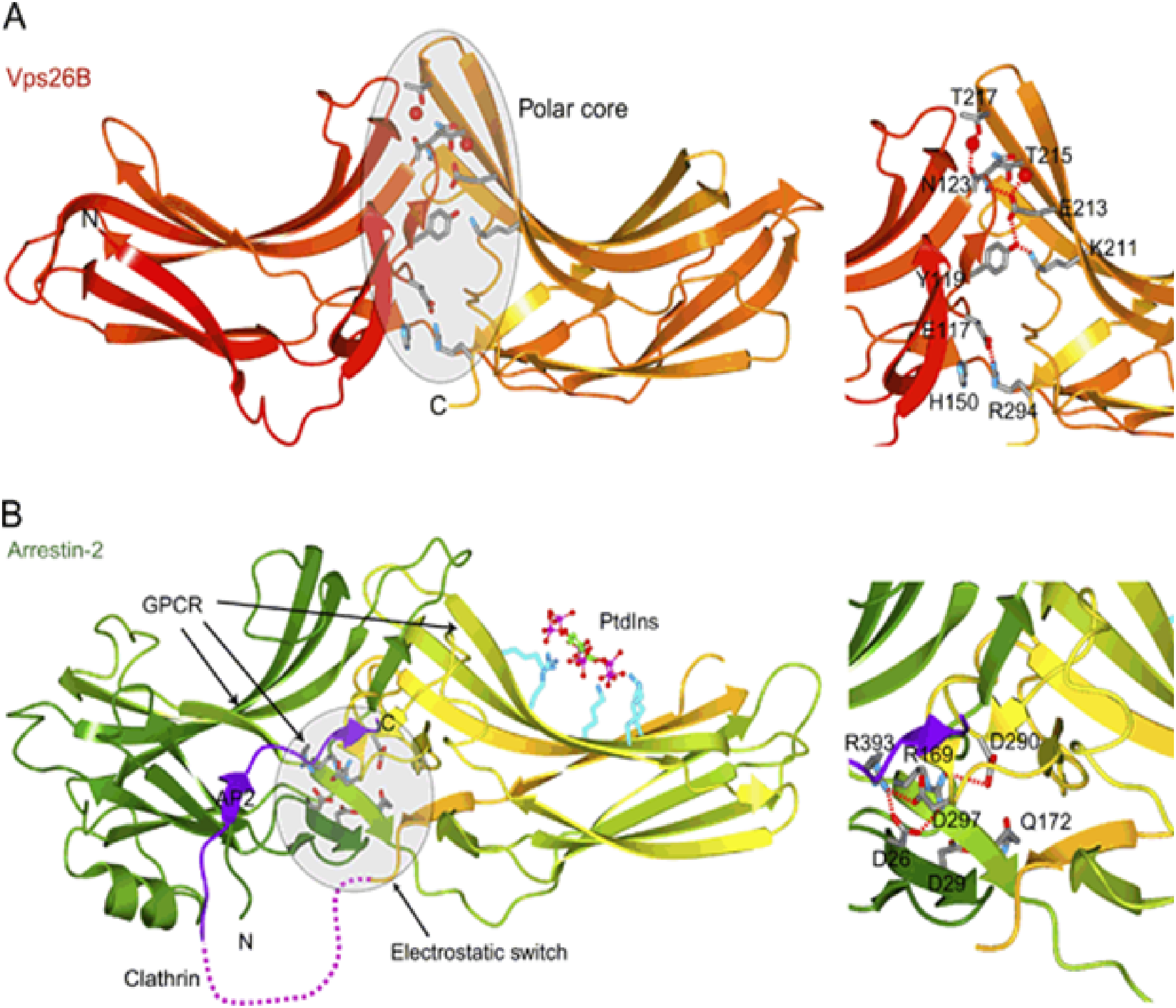
Structural comparison of Vps26 with arrestins

Vps26 is a 38-kDa subunit that has a two-lobed structure with a polar core that resembles the arrestin family of trafficking adaptor. This fold consist of two related β-sandwich subdomains with a fibronectin type III domain topology. The two domains are joined by a flexible linker and are closely associated by an unusual polar core. Arrestins are regulatory proteins known for connecting G-protein coupled receptors (GPCRs) to clathrin during endocytosis. They play many critical roles in cell signalling and membrane trafficking. Both Vps26 and arrestins are composed of two structurally related β-sheet domains forming extensive interfaces with each other, using polar and electrostatic contacts to create interdomain interactions for ligand binding. However, there are significant structural differences between both Vps26 and arrestins. Vps26 protein has extended C-terminal tails that do not contain identifiable clathrin- or AP2-binding sequences, and therefore cannot form stable intramolecular contacts with clathrin and AP2, which has been observed for arrestins. Moreover, Vps26 does not have similar sequences as arrestins for GPCR and phospholipid interactions.

== Vps26B paralogue ==
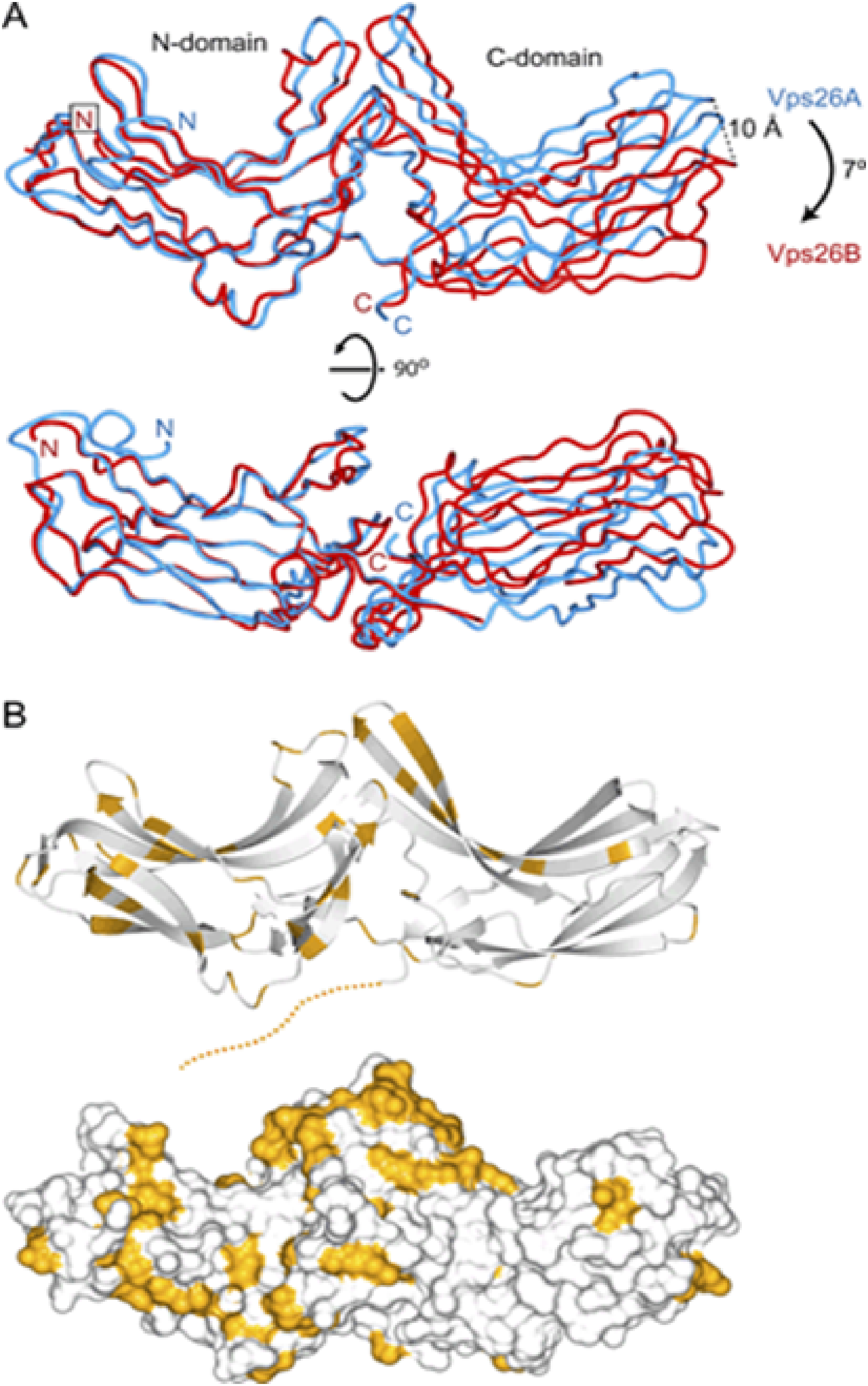
Structural differences between Vps26A and Vps26B

In yeast, there is only one Vps26 species, whereas there are two Vps26 paralogues (Vps26A and Vps26B) in mammals.

X-ray crystallography revealed that the structures of both Vps26A and Vps26B share a similar bilobal β-sandwich structure and possess 70% sequence homology. However, these two paralogues distinctly differ on the surface patch within the N-terminal domain, the apex region where the N-terminal and C-terminal domains meet and the disordered C-terminal tail. Vps26B contains several putative serine phosphorylation residues within this disordered tail, which may represent a potential mechanism to modulate the difference between Vps26A and Vps26B. A recent study conducted by Bugarcic et al. pinpointed that this disordered tail on C-terminal region of Vps26B is one of the underlying factors that contributes to the failure for Vps26B-containing Retromer to associate with CI-M6PR, ultimately leading to CI-M6PR degradation, accompanied with increased cathepsin D secretion.
