= Zaki syndrome =

Rare genetic syndrome

Zaki syndrome is a syndrome characterized by microcephaly, facial dysmorphism, foot syndactyly, renal agenesis, alopecia, coloboma, and heart defects. It is caused by a homozygous missense mutation in the WLS gene on the short arm of chromosome 1 in humans (1p31.3), which encodes the Wnt ligand secretion mediator, also known as Wntless. The mutation was identified in 10 persons from 5 unrelated families and the syndrome was published for the first time in September 2021 in the New England Journal of Medicine. Zaki syndrome is named after Maha S. Zaki, a co-author of the publication.
