= OXR1 =

Protein-coding gene in the species Homo sapiens

Identifiers
- Aliases: OXR1, TLDC3, Nbla00307, oxidation resistance 1, CHEGDD
- External IDs: OMIM: 605609; MGI: 2179326; HomoloGene: 24993; GeneCards: OXR1; OMA:OXR1 - orthologs

Gene location (Human)
Chr.	Chromosome 8 (human)
Band	8q23.1	Start	106,270,144 bp
Band	8q23.1	End	106,752,694 bp

Gene location (Mouse)
Chr.	Chromosome 15 (mouse)
Band	15|15 B3.1	Start	41,310,878 bp
Band	15|15 B3.1	End	41,724,444 bp
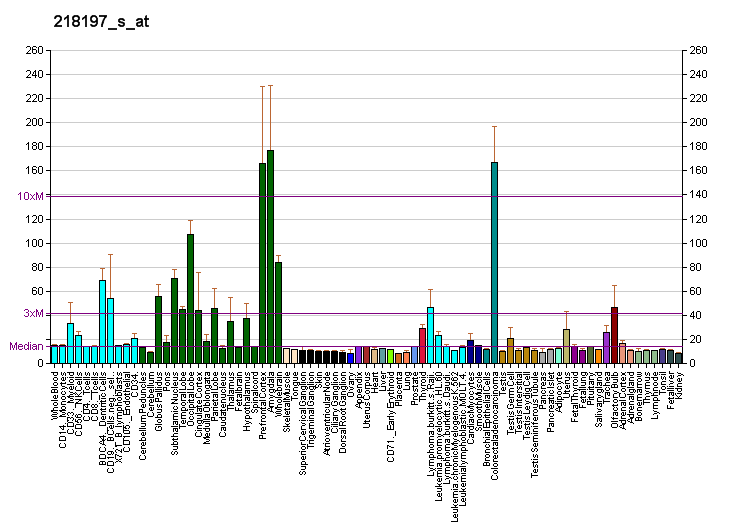
RNA expression pattern
Bgee	Human / Mouse (ortholog); Top expressed in: pons; Achilles tendon; lateral nuclear group of thalamus; trigeminal ganglion; sperm; spinal ganglia; seminal vesicula; Brodmann area 23; corpus epididymis; prefrontal cortex / Top expressed in: medial dorsal nucleus; parotid gland; subiculum; pontine nuclei; primary motor cortex; habenula; medial geniculate nucleus; lobe of cerebellum; cerebellar vermis; inferior colliculi; More reference expression data
BioGPS	More reference expression data
Gene ontology
Molecular function	oxidoreductase activity; protein binding; molecular function
Cellular component	nucleolus; mitochondrion; cellular component; nucleoplasm; intracellular membrane-bounded organelle
Biological process	negative regulation of neuron apoptotic process; response to oxidative stress; cellular response to hydroperoxide; adult walking behavior; neuron apoptotic process; negative regulation of cellular response to oxidative stress; negative regulation of peptidyl-cysteine S-nitrosylation; negative regulation of oxidative stress-induced neuron death
Sources:Amigo / QuickGO
Orthologs
Species	Human	Mouse
Entrez	55074	170719
Ensembl	ENSG00000164830	ENSMUSG00000022307
UniProt	Q8N573	Q4KMM3
RefSeq (mRNA)	NM_001198532; NM_001198533; NM_001198534; NM_001198535; NM_018002 NM_181354	NM_001130163; NM_001130164; NM_001130165; NM_001130166; NM_130885 NM_001358976; NM_001358977; NM_001358978
RefSeq (protein)	NP_001185461; NP_001185462; NP_001185463; NP_001185464; NP_060472 NP_851999	NP_001123635; NP_001123636; NP_001123637; NP_001123638; NP_570955 NP_001345905; NP_001345906; NP_001345907
Location (UCSC)	Chr 8: 106.27 – 106.75 Mb	Chr 15: 41.31 – 41.72 Mb
PubMed search
- Wikidata
View/Edit Human	View/Edit Mouse

Oxidation resistance protein 1 is a protein that in humans is encoded by the OXR1 gene. Loss of OXR1 function causes decline of the retromer complex.
