= SNX5 =

Protein-coding gene in the species Homo sapiens

Identifiers
- Aliases: SNX5, sorting nexin 5
- External IDs: OMIM: 605937; MGI: 1916428; GeneCards: SNX5
Available structures
PDB	Ortholog search: PDBe RCSB
PDB	List of PDB id codes 1SYS

Gene location (Human)
Chr.	Chromosome 20 (human)
Band	20p11.23	Start	17,941,597 bp
Band	20p11.23	End	17,968,980 bp

Gene location (Mouse)
Chr.	Chromosome 2 (mouse)
Band	2 G1|2 70.98 cM	Start	144,092,043 bp
Band	2 G1|2 70.98 cM	End	144,112,826 bp
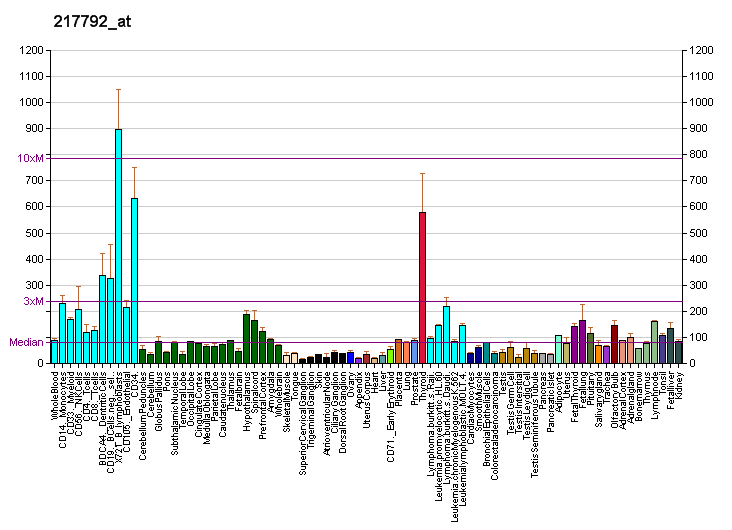
RNA expression pattern
Bgee	Human / Mouse (ortholog); Top expressed in: left lobe of thyroid gland; right lobe of thyroid gland; ventricular zone; Achilles tendon; rectum; gonad; spleen; corpus epididymis; secondary oocyte; left ovary / Top expressed in: stroma of bone marrow; tail of embryo; abdominal wall; epiblast; Gonadal ridge; mandibular prominence; dermis; efferent ductule; migratory enteric neural crest cell; maxillary prominence; More reference expression data
BioGPS	More reference expression data
Gene ontology
Molecular function	dynactin binding; protein binding; phosphatidylinositol binding; protein heterodimerization activity; lipid binding; cadherin binding; phosphatidylinositol-5-phosphate binding; D1 dopamine receptor binding; phosphatidylinositol-4-phosphate binding; phosphatidylinositol-3,5-bisphosphate binding
Cellular component	cytoplasm; endosome; cell projection; early endosome membrane; retromer, tubulation complex; membrane; ruffle; extrinsic component of cytoplasmic side of plasma membrane; plasma membrane; extrinsic component of endosome membrane; tubular endosome; retromer complex; early endosome; phagocytic cup; cytoplasmic vesicle membrane; macropinocytic cup; cytoplasmic vesicle; cytosol; brush border; intracellular anatomical structure
Biological process	endocytosis; vesicle organization; retrograde transport, endosome to Golgi; protein transport; pinocytosis; intracellular protein transport; regulation of macroautophagy; epidermal growth factor catabolic process; positive regulation of renal sodium excretion; negative regulation of blood pressure
Sources:Amigo / QuickGO
Orthologs
Databases	NCBI: entry; OMA: entry
Species	Human	Mouse
Entrez	27131	69178
Ensembl	ENSG00000089006	ENSMUSG00000027423
UniProt	Q9Y5X3; Q5QPE4	Q9D8U8
RefSeq (mRNA)	NM_152227; NM_001282454; NM_014426	NM_001199188; NM_024225
RefSeq (protein)	NP_001269383; NP_055241; NP_689413	NP_001186117; NP_077187
Location (UCSC)	Chr 20: 17.94 – 17.97 Mb	Chr 2: 144.09 – 144.11 Mb
PubMed search
- Wikidata
View/Edit Human	View/Edit Mouse

Sorting nexin-5 is a protein that in humans is encoded by the SNX5 gene.

This gene encodes a member of the sorting nexin family. Members of this family contain a phox (PX) domain, which is a phosphoinositide binding domain, and are involved in intracellular trafficking. This protein is a component of the mammalian retromer complex, which facilitates cargo retrieval from endosomes to the trans-Golgi network. It has also been shown to bind to the Fanconi anemia, complementation group A protein. This gene results in two transcript variants encoding the same protein.

== Interactions ==
SNX5 has been shown to interact with FANCA.
