= OR52W1 =

Protein-coding gene in the species Homo sapiens

Identifiers
- Aliases: OR52W1, OR11-71, OR52W1P, olfactory receptor family 52 subfamily W member 1
- External IDs: MGI: 3030526; GeneCards: OR52W1

Gene location (Human)
Chr.	Chromosome 11 (human)
Band	11p15.4	Start	6,199,224 bp
Band	11p15.4	End	6,200,186 bp

Gene location (Mouse)
Chr.	Chromosome 7 (mouse)
Band	7|7 E3	Start	105,017,437 bp
Band	7|7 E3	End	105,018,562 bp
RNA expression pattern
Bgee	Human / Mouse (ortholog); Top expressed in: prefrontal cortex; duodenum; Descending thoracic aorta; rectum / Top expressed in: hypothalamus; superior frontal gyrus; dentate gyrus of hippocampal formation granule cell; primary visual cortex; cerebellar cortex; hippocampus proper; oocyte; olfactory bulb; striatum of neuraxis; secondary oocyte; More reference expression data
BioGPS	n/a
Gene ontology
Molecular function	G protein-coupled receptor activity; olfactory receptor activity; signal transducer activity
Cellular component	integral component of membrane; plasma membrane; membrane
Biological process	sensory perception of smell; signal transduction; response to stimulus; detection of chemical stimulus involved in sensory perception of smell; G protein-coupled receptor signaling pathway
Sources:Amigo / QuickGO
Orthologs
Databases	NCBI: entry; OMA: entry
Species	Human	Mouse
Entrez	120787	258352
Ensembl	ENSG00000175485	ENSMUSG00000073906
UniProt	Q6IF63	Q8VF03
RefSeq (mRNA)	NM_001005178	NM_146355
RefSeq (protein)	NP_001005178	NP_666467
Location (UCSC)	Chr 11: 6.2 – 6.2 Mb	Chr 7: 105.02 – 105.02 Mb
PubMed search
- Wikidata
View/Edit Human	View/Edit Mouse

Olfactory receptor 52W1 is a protein that in humans is encoded by the OR52W1 gene.

Olfactory receptors interact with odorant molecules in the nose, to initiate a neuronal response that triggers the perception of a smell. The olfactory receptor proteins are members of a large family of G-protein-coupled receptors (GPCR) arising from single coding-exon genes. Olfactory receptors share a 7-transmembrane domain structure with many neurotransmitter and hormone receptors and are responsible for the recognition and G protein-mediated transduction of odorant signals. The olfactory receptor gene family is the largest in the genome. The nomenclature assigned to the olfactory receptor genes and proteins for this organism is independent of other organisms.

== See also ==
- Olfactory receptor
