= Protein wntless homolog =

Protein found in humans

WLS

Identifiers
- Aliases: WLS, C1orf139, EVI, GPR177, MRP, mig-14, wntless Wnt ligand secretion mediator, Wnt ligand secretion mediator, ZKS
- External IDs: OMIM: 611514; MGI: 1915401; GeneCards: WLS

Gene location (Human)
Chr.	Chromosome 1 (human)
Band	1p31.3	Start	68,098,473 bp
Band	1p31.3	End	68,233,120 bp

Gene location (Mouse)
Chr.	Chromosome 3 (mouse)
Band	3|3 H4	Start	159,545,309 bp
Band	3|3 H4	End	159,644,300 bp
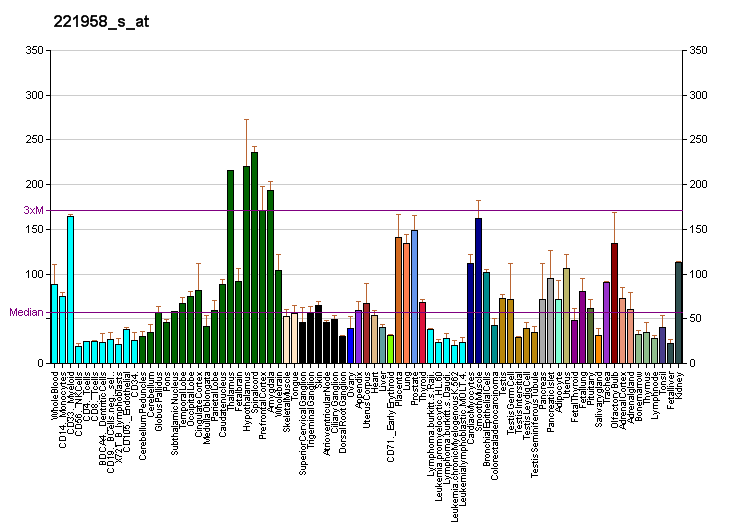
RNA expression pattern
Bgee	Human / Mouse (ortholog); Top expressed in: stromal cell of endometrium; Epithelium of choroid plexus; retinal pigment epithelium; corpus epididymis; gastric mucosa; islet of Langerhans; gallbladder; optic nerve; endothelial cell; bronchial epithelial cell / Top expressed in: calvaria; molar; left lung lobe; olfactory epithelium; pineal gland; choroid plexus of fourth ventricle; maxillary prominence; right kidney; corneal stroma; seminal vesicula; More reference expression data
BioGPS	More reference expression data
Gene ontology
Molecular function	protein binding; Wnt-protein binding; mu-type opioid receptor binding
Cellular component	integral component of membrane; endocytic vesicle membrane; endosome; Golgi apparatus; early endosome membrane; membrane; plasma membrane; dendrite membrane; trans-Golgi network; early endosome; dendrite cytoplasm; extracellular exosome; cytoplasmic vesicle membrane; endoplasmic reticulum membrane; cytoplasmic vesicle; Golgi membrane; endoplasmic reticulum
Biological process	exocrine pancreas development; positive regulation of canonical Wnt signaling pathway; positive regulation of Wnt protein secretion; mesoderm formation; hindbrain development; multicellular organism development; positive regulation of Wnt signaling pathway; positive regulation of I-kappaB kinase/NF-kappaB signaling; intracellular protein transport; anterior/posterior axis specification; midbrain development; Wnt signaling pathway; Wnt protein secretion
Sources:Amigo / QuickGO
Orthologs
Databases	NCBI: entry; OMA: entry
Species	Human	Mouse
Entrez	79971	68151
Ensembl	ENSG00000116729	ENSMUSG00000028173
UniProt	Q5T9L3	Q6DID7
RefSeq (mRNA)	NM_001002292; NM_001193334; NM_024911	NM_026582; NM_001356349; NM_001356350
RefSeq (protein)	NP_001002292; NP_001180263; NP_079187	NP_080858; NP_001343278; NP_001343279
Location (UCSC)	Chr 1: 68.1 – 68.23 Mb	Chr 3: 159.55 – 159.64 Mb
PubMed search
- Wikidata
View/Edit Human	View/Edit Mouse

Protein wntless homolog, commonly known as Wntless, is encoded in humans by the WLS gene. Wntless is a receptor for Wnt proteins in Wnt-secreting cells.

Wntless was shown to be a cargo for the retromer complex. It has been found essential for hair follicle induction.

A homozygous missense mutation in the WLS gene was identified in Zaki syndrome.

== See also ==
- GPR177+receptor,+human at the U.S. National Library of Medicine Medical Subject Headings (MeSH)
