= PIM1 =

Protein-coding gene in the species Homo sapiens

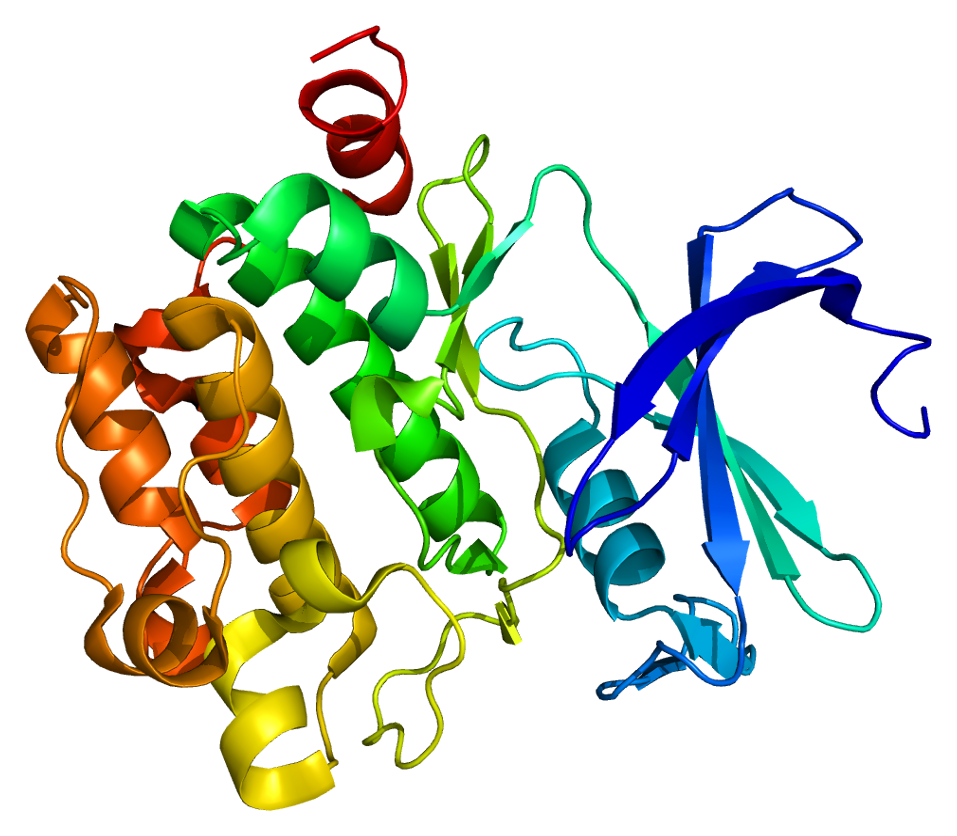

Identifiers
- Aliases: PIM1, PIM, Pim-1 proto-oncogene, serine/threonine kinase
- External IDs: OMIM: 164960; MGI: 97584; GeneCards: PIM1
Available structures
PDB	Ortholog search: PDBe RCSB
PDB	List of PDB id codes 1XQZ, 1XR1, 1XWS, 1YHS, 1YI3, 1YI4, 1YWV, 1YXS, 1YXT, 1YXU, 1YXV, 1YXX, 2BIK, 2BIL, 2BZH, 2BZI, 2BZJ, 2BZK, 2C3I, 2J2I, 2O3P, 2O63, 2O64, 2O65, 2OBJ, 2OI4, 2XIX, 2XIY, 2XIZ, 2XJ0, 2XJ1, 2XJ2, 3A99, 3BGP, 3BGQ, 3BGZ, 3BWF, 3C4E, 3CXW, 3CY2, 3CY3, 3DCV, 3F2A, 3JPV, 3JXW, 3JY0, 3JYA, 3MA3, 3QF9, 3R00, 3R01, 3R02, 3R04, 3T9I, 3UIX, 3UMW, 3UMX, 3VBQ, 3VBT, 3VBV, 3VBW, 3VBX, 3VBY, 3VC4, 3WE8, 4A7C, 4ALU, 4ALV, 4ALW, 4AS0, 4BZN, 4BZO, 4DTK, 4ENX, 4ENY, 4GW8, 4I41, 4IAA, 4JX3, 4JX7, 4K0Y, 4K18, 4K1B, 4LL5, 4LM5, 4MBI, 4MBL, 4MED, 4MTA, 4N6Y, 4N6Z, 4N70, 4RBL, 4RC2, 4RC3, 4RC4, 4RPV, 4TY1, 4WRS, 4WSY, 4WT6, 4XHK, 4XH6, 5C1Q, 5DWR, 5DIA, 5DHJ, 5DGZ, 5EOL, 5IPJ, 5IIS
Enzyme activity
EC #	BRENDA	ExPASy	KEGG	MetaCyc
2.7.11.1	↗	↗	↗	↗

Gene location (Human)
Chr.	Chromosome 6 (human)
Band	6p21.2	Start	37,170,152 bp
Band	6p21.2	End	37,175,428 bp

Gene location (Mouse)
Chr.	Chromosome 17 (mouse)
Band	17 A3.3|17 15.38 cM	Start	29,709,727 bp
Band	17 A3.3|17 15.38 cM	End	29,715,086 bp
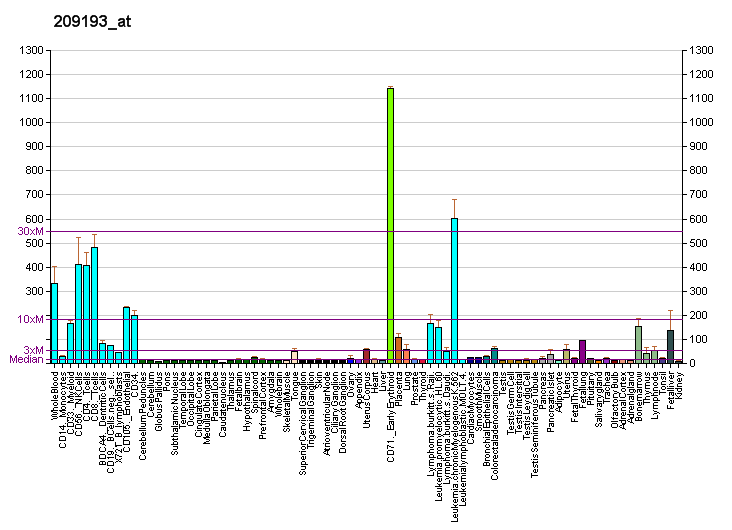
RNA expression pattern
Bgee	Human / Mouse (ortholog); Top expressed in: left uterine tube; granulocyte; gastric mucosa; gallbladder; blood; skin of abdomen; skin of leg; ventricular zone; mucosa of pharynx; buccal mucosa cell / Top expressed in: granulocyte; lip; decidua; blood; morula; yolk sac; thymus; adrenal gland; lactiferous gland; bone marrow; More reference expression data
BioGPS	More reference expression data
Gene ontology
Molecular function	transferase activity; nucleotide binding; protein kinase activity; manganese ion binding; ribosomal small subunit binding; transcription factor binding; metal ion binding; kinase activity; protein serine/threonine kinase activity; protein binding; ATP binding
Cellular component	cytoplasm; membrane; plasma membrane; nucleoplasm; nucleolus; cytosol; nucleus
Biological process	phosphorylation; negative regulation of apoptotic process; negative regulation of DNA-binding transcription factor activity; multicellular organism development; protein phosphorylation; hyaluronan metabolic process; protein autophosphorylation; cell cycle; cell population proliferation; vitamin D receptor signaling pathway; apoptotic process; regulation of mitotic cell cycle; positive regulation of cardiac muscle cell proliferation; positive regulation of cardioblast proliferation; cytokine-mediated signaling pathway; positive regulation of transcription, DNA-templated; protein stabilization; regulation of hematopoietic stem cell proliferation
Sources:Amigo / QuickGO
Orthologs
Databases	NCBI: entry; OMA: entry
Species	Human	Mouse
Entrez	5292	18712
Ensembl	ENSG00000137193	ENSMUSG00000024014
UniProt	P11309	P06803
RefSeq (mRNA)	NM_002648; NM_001243186	NM_008842; NM_001364913
RefSeq (protein)	NP_001230115; NP_002639	NP_032868; NP_001351842
Location (UCSC)	Chr 6: 37.17 – 37.18 Mb	Chr 17: 29.71 – 29.72 Mb
PubMed search
- Wikidata
View/Edit Human	View/Edit Mouse

Proto-oncogene serine/threonine-protein kinase Pim-1 is an enzyme that in humans is encoded by the PIM1 gene.

Pim-1 is a proto-oncogene which encodes for the serine/threonine kinase of the same name. The pim-1 oncogene was first described in relation to murine T-cell lymphomas, as it was the locus most frequently activated by the Moloney murine leukemia virus. Subsequently, the oncogene has been implicated in multiple human cancers, including prostate cancer, acute myeloid leukemia and other hematopoietic malignancies. Primarily expressed in spleen, thymus, bone marrow, prostate, oral epithelial, hippocampus and fetal liver cells, Pim-1 has also been found to be highly expressed in cell cultures isolated from human tumors. Pim-1 is mainly involved in cell cycle progression, apoptosis and transcriptional activation, as well as more general signal transduction pathways. Pim-1's role in oncogenic signalling has led to it becoming a widely studied target in cancer research, with numerous drug candidates under investigation which target it.

== Gene ==
Located on chromosome 6 (6p21.2), the gene encompasses 5Kb of DNA, including 6 exons and 5 introns. Expression of Pim-1 has been shown to be regulated by the JAK/STAT pathway. Direct binding of transcription factors STAT3 and STAT5 to the Pim-1 promoter results in the transcription of Pim-1. The Pim-1 gene has been found to be conserved in dogs, cows, mice, rats, zebrafish and C. elegans. Pim-1 deficient mice have been shown to be phenotypically normal, indicating that there is redundancy in the function of this kinase. In fact, sequence homology searches have shown that two other Pim-1-like kinases, Pim-2 and Pim-3, are structurally and functionally similar. The Pim-1 gene encodes has multiple translation initiation sites, resulting in two proteins of 34 and 44kD.

== Protein structure ==
Human, murine and rat Pim-1 contain 313 amino acids, and have a 94 – 97% amino acid identity. The active site of the protein, ranging from amino acids 38-290, is composed of several conserved motifs, including a glycine loop motif, a phosphate binding site and a proton acceptor site. Modification of the protein at amino acid 67 (lysine to methionine) results in the inactivation of the kinase.

== Activation and stabilization ==
Pim-1 is primarily involved in cytokine signaling, and has been implicated in many signal transduction pathways. Because Pim-1 transcription is initiated by STAT3 and STAT5, its production is regulated by the cytokines that regulate the STAT pathway, or STAT factors. These include interleukins (IL-2, IL-3, IL-5, IL-6, IL-7, IL12, IL-15), prolactin, TNFα, EGF and IFNγ, among others. Pim-1 itself can bind to negative regulators of the JAK/STAT pathway, resulting in a negative feedback loop.

Although little is known about the post-transcriptional modifications of Pim-1, it has been hypothesized that Hsp90 is responsible for the folding and stabilization of Pim-1, although the exact mechanism has yet to be discovered. Furthermore, the serine/threonine phosphatase PP2 has been shown to degrade Pim-1.

== Interactions ==
PIM1 has been shown to interact with:

- CBX3,
- CDC25A,
- Heat shock protein 90kDa alpha (cytosolic), member A1,
- NFATC1,
- Nuclear mitotic apparatus protein 1,
- P21,
- SND1 and
- RELA.

Other known substrates/binding partners of Pim-1 include proteins involved in transcription regulation (nuclear adaptor protein p100, HP-1, PAP-1 and TRAF2 / SNX6), and regulation of the JAK/STAT pathway (SOCS1 and SOCS3). Furthermore, Pim-1 has been shown to be a cofactor for c-Myc, a transcription factor believed to regulate 15% of all genes, and their synergy has been in prostate tumorigenesis.

Pim-1 is able to phosphorylate many targets, including itself. Many of its targets are involved in cell cycle regulation.

=== Activates ===
- Cdc25C (G_{1}/S positive regulator): Activation results in increased G_{1} → S
- Cdc25C (G_{2}/M positive regulator): Activation results in increased G_{2} → M

=== Deactivates ===
- Bad (Pro-apoptotic protein): Deactivation results in increased cell survival
- CKI (G1/S negative regulator): Deactivation results in increased G_{1} → S
- C-TAK1 (Cdc25C inhibitor): Deactivation results in increased G_{2} → M

== Clinical implications ==
Pim-1 is directly involved in the regulation of cell cycle progression and apoptosis, and has been implicated in numerous cancers including prostate cancer, Burkitt's lymphoma and oral cancer, as well as numerous hematopoietic lymphomas. Single nucleotide polymorphisms in the Pim-1 gene have been associated with increased risk for lung cancer in Korean patients, and have also been found in diffuse large cell lymphomas. As well as showing useful activity against a range of cancers, PIM kinase inhibitors have also been suggested as possible treatments for Alzheimer's disease. PIM expression is sufficient to drive resistance to anti-angiogenic agents in prostate and colon cancer models, although the mechanism is not fully elucidated. It has been suggested that a co-targeted therapeutic approach to inhibition of Pim-1 in cancer may be preferable, with suggested co-targets including the PI3K pathway and more. PIM1 expression was found to be elevated during aging and to contribute to the development of pulmonary fibrosis.

== Inhibitors ==
A large number of small molecule inhibitors of PIM1 have been developed. Clinical trial results so far have shown promising anti-cancer activity, but side effects due to insufficient selectivity have proved problematic and research continues to find more potent and selective inhibitors for this target.

Examples

- AZD1208
- LGH447
- SGI-1776,
- TP-3654
