= FTS and Hook-interacting protein =

Protein-coding gene in the species Homo sapiens

FHIP1B

Identifiers
- Aliases: FHIP1B, C11orf56, family with sequence similarity 160 member A2, FHIP, FAM160A2, FHF complex subunit HOOK interacting protein 1B
- External IDs: MGI: 1921599; HomoloGene: 75329; GeneCards: FHIP1B; OMA:FHIP1B - orthologs

Gene location (Human)
Chr.	Chromosome 11 (human)
Band	11p15.4	Start	6,211,345 bp
Band	11p15.4	End	6,234,711 bp

Gene location (Mouse)
Chr.	Chromosome 7 (mouse)
Band	7|7 E3	Start	105,371,211 bp
Band	7|7 E3	End	105,400,054 bp
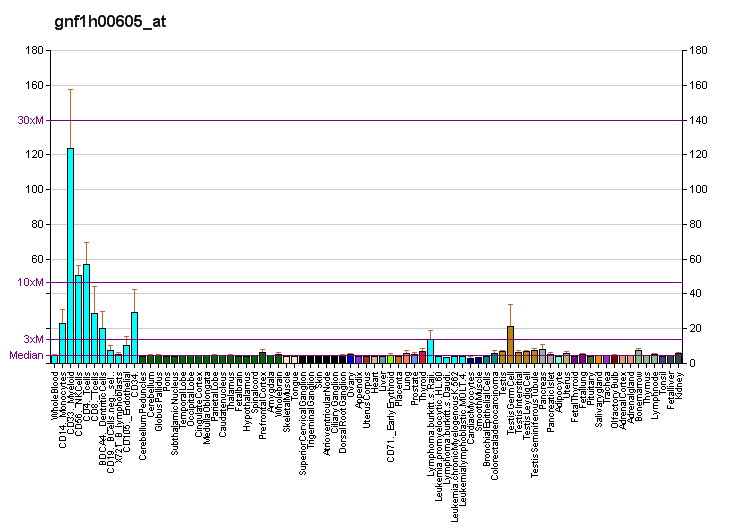
RNA expression pattern
Bgee	Human / Mouse (ortholog); Top expressed in: mucosa of ileum; mucosa of transverse colon; right uterine tube; right testis; left testis; granulocyte; rectum; right lobe of thyroid gland; left lobe of thyroid gland; right lobe of liver / Top expressed in: granulocyte; tail of embryo; supraoptic nucleus; Rostral migratory stream; neural layer of retina; spermatocyte; spermatid; duodenum; right kidney; proximal tubule; More reference expression data
BioGPS	More reference expression data
Gene ontology
Molecular function	protein binding
Cellular component	FHF complex; cytosol
Biological process	protein transport; lysosome organization; early endosome to late endosome transport; endosome organization; endosome to lysosome transport
Sources:Amigo / QuickGO
Orthologs
Species	Human	Mouse
Entrez	84067	74349
Ensembl	ENSG00000051009	ENSMUSG00000044465
UniProt	Q8N612	Q3U2I3
RefSeq (mRNA)	NM_001098794; NM_032127	NM_001242363; NM_001242364; NM_001242365; NM_199009
RefSeq (protein)	NP_001092264; NP_115503	NP_001229292; NP_001229293; NP_001229294; NP_950174
Location (UCSC)	Chr 11: 6.21 – 6.23 Mb	Chr 7: 105.37 – 105.4 Mb
PubMed search
- Wikidata
View/Edit Human	View/Edit Mouse

FHF complex subunit HOOK-interacting protein 1B that in humans is encoded by the gene FHIP1B (previously FAM160A2). FTS and Hook-interacting protein (or FHIP) is an alternative name.
