= VPS26B =

Protein-coding gene in the species Homo sapiens

Identifiers
- Aliases: VPS26B, Pep8b, VPS26 retromer complex component B, VPS26, retromer complex component B
- External IDs: OMIM: 610027; MGI: 1917656; HomoloGene: 3601; GeneCards: VPS26B; OMA:VPS26B - orthologs

Gene location (Human)
Chr.	Chromosome 11 (human)
Band	11q25	Start	134,224,671 bp
Band	11q25	End	134,247,788 bp

Gene location (Mouse)
Chr.	Chromosome 9 (mouse)
Band	9|9 A4	Start	26,919,067 bp
Band	9|9 A4	End	26,941,361 bp
RNA expression pattern
Bgee	Human / Mouse (ortholog); Top expressed in: right hemisphere of cerebellum; skin of arm; ganglionic eminence; granulocyte; right frontal lobe; prefrontal cortex; skin of leg; Brodmann area 9; skin of abdomen; cingulate gyrus / Top expressed in: ascending aorta; aortic valve; granulocyte; Region I of hippocampus proper; subiculum; nucleus accumbens; supraoptic nucleus; cerebellar cortex; barrel cortex; olfactory tubercle; More reference expression data
BioGPS	n/a
Gene ontology
Molecular function	protein binding
Cellular component	cytoplasm; retromer complex; late endosome; early endosome; membrane; retromer, cargo-selective complex; endosome; cytosol; phagocytic vesicle
Biological process	protein transport; retrograde transport, endosome to Golgi; regulation of macroautophagy; intracellular protein transport; cellular response to interferon-gamma; signal transduction
Sources:Amigo / QuickGO
Orthologs
Species	Human	Mouse
Entrez	112936	69091
Ensembl	ENSG00000151502	ENSMUSG00000031988
UniProt	Q4G0F5	Q8C0E2
RefSeq (mRNA)	NM_052875	NM_178027
RefSeq (protein)	NP_443107; NP_443107.1	NP_821170
Location (UCSC)	Chr 11: 134.22 – 134.25 Mb	Chr 9: 26.92 – 26.94 Mb
PubMed search
- Wikidata
View/Edit Human	View/Edit Mouse

Vacuolar protein sorting 26 homolog B (S. pombe) is a protein in humans that is encoded by the VPS26B gene.
