= Cation-dependent mannose-6-phosphate receptor =

Protein found in humans

M6PR
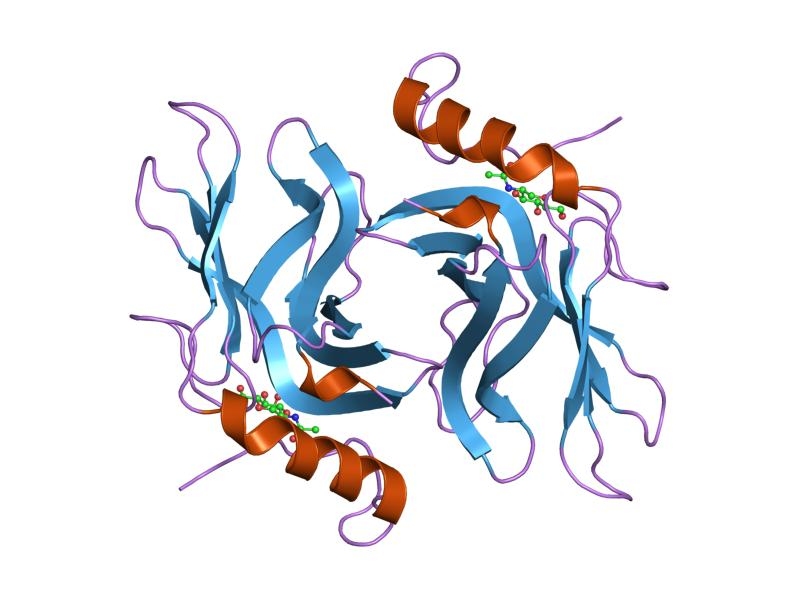
Available structures
PDB	Ortholog search: PDBe RCSB
PDB	List of PDB id codes 1JUQ

Identifiers
- Aliases: M6PR, CD-MPR, MPR 46, MPR-46, MPR46, SMPR, CD-mannose-6-phosphate receptor, cation dependent
- External IDs: OMIM: 154540; MGI: 96904; HomoloGene: 31086; GeneCards: M6PR; OMA:M6PR - orthologs

Gene location (Human)
Chr.	Chromosome 12 (human)
Band	12p13.31	Start	8,940,361 bp
Band	12p13.31	End	8,949,761 bp

Gene location (Mouse)
Chr.	Chromosome 6 (mouse)
Band	6 F1|6 57.52 cM	Start	122,285,679 bp
Band	6 F1|6 57.52 cM	End	122,294,639 bp
RNA expression pattern
Bgee	Human / Mouse (ortholog); Top expressed in: monocyte; granulocyte; islet of Langerhans; spleen; rectum; lymph node; gallbladder; right lung; upper lobe of left lung; gastric mucosa / Top expressed in: proximal tubule; right kidney; human kidney; ovary; placenta; adrenal gland; lung; ileum; spleen; yolk sac; More reference expression data
BioGPS	n/a
Gene ontology
Molecular function	mannose transmembrane transporter activity; mannose binding; transmembrane signaling receptor activity; protein binding; retromer complex binding; protein domain specific binding
Cellular component	perinuclear region of cytoplasm; integral component of membrane; lysosomal membrane; endosome; late endosome; lysosome; integral component of plasma membrane; lytic vacuole; membrane; trans-Golgi network membrane; transport vesicle; plasma membrane; clathrin-coated vesicle membrane; retromer complex; trans-Golgi network; Golgi apparatus
Biological process	mannose transmembrane transport; receptor-mediated endocytosis; endosome to lysosome transport; signal transduction; secretion of lysosomal enzymes; membrane organization; transport; protein targeting to lysosome; lysosomal transport
Sources:Amigo / QuickGO
Orthologs
Species	Human	Mouse
Entrez	4074	17113
Ensembl	ENSG00000003056	ENSMUSG00000007458
UniProt	P20645	P24668
RefSeq (mRNA)	NM_001207024; NM_002355	NM_010749
RefSeq (protein)	NP_001193953; NP_002346	NP_034879
Location (UCSC)	Chr 12: 8.94 – 8.95 Mb	Chr 6: 122.29 – 122.29 Mb
PubMed search
- Wikidata
View/Edit Human	View/Edit Mouse

In the fields of biochemistry and cell biology, the cation-dependent mannose-6-phosphate receptor (CD-MPR) also known as the 46 kDa mannose 6-phosphate receptor is a protein that in humans is encoded by the M6PR gene.

The CD-MPR is one of two transmembrane proteins that bind mannose-6-phosphate (M6P) tags on acid hydrolase precursors in the Golgi apparatus that are destined for transport to the lysosome. Homologues of CD-MPR are found in all eukaryotes.

== Structure ==
The CD-MPR is a type I transmembrane protein (that is, it has a single transmembrane domain with its C-termini on the cytoplasmic side of lipid membranes) with a relatively short cytoplasmic tail. The extracytoplasmic/lumenal M6P binding-domain consists of 157 amino acid residues. The CD-MPR is approximately 46 kDa in size and it exists and functions as a dimer.

The cell surface receptor for insulin-like growth factor 2 also functions as a cation-independent mannose 6-phosphate receptor. It consists of fifteen repeats homologous to the 157-residue CD-M6PR domain, two of which are responsible for binding to M6P.

== Function ==
Both CD-MPRs and CI-MPRs are lectins that bind their M6P-tagged cargo in the lumen of the Golgi apparatus. The CD-MPR shows greatly enhanced binding to M6P in the presence of divalent cations, such as manganese. The MPRs (bound to their cargo) are recognized by the GGA family of clathrin adaptor proteins and accumulate in forming clathrin-coated vesicles. They are trafficked to the early endosome where, in the relatively low pH environment of the endosome, the MPRs release their cargo. The MPRs are recycled back to the Golgi, again by way of interaction with GGAs and vesicles. The cargo proteins are then trafficked to the lysosome via the late endosome independently of the MPRs.

== See also ==
- Mannose 6-phosphate receptor
