= P6 =

P6, P-6, or P.6 may refer to:

- P6 (microarchitecture), a sixth-generation Intel x86 microprocessor microarchitecture
- POWER6, a sixth-generational IBM microprocessor microarchitecture
- p6 protein, a protein of HIV
- HAT-P-6, a star in the constellation Andromeda
- Hexaphosphabenzene, an allotrope of phosphorus, chemical formula P_{6}
- Integrated Truss Structure#P6, S6 trusses, trusses on the International Space Station
- Rover P6 series, a saloon car model produced from 1963 to 1977 in Solihull, West Midlands, England
- SIG Sauer P225/P6, a variant of the P225 pistol used by West German police forces
- Pentacon Six, a single-lens reflex (SLR) medium format camera system
- Period 6, a period of the periodic table of elements
- Persona 6, an upcoming video game
- Primavera P6, a project management software package by Primavera (software)
- IATA code for Privilege Style, a charter airline
- Principle 6 campaign, opposing anti-gay Russian laws at the 2014 Olympics
- P6 ATAV, an Indonesian light attack vehicle
- P-6, a variant of the Cold War era Soviet naval cruise missile SS-N-3A Shaddock
- PPPPPP (manga), a short hand for the manga by Maporo 3-Gō.
- Netpbm File_formats, binary ppm file
- Joint Primary 6 Examination, a standardized examination from 1949 to 1962
- P6, space group number 168
- P6̅, space group number 174

== Aircraft ==
- Curtiss P-6 Hawk, a 1927 American single-engine biplane fighter
- Piaggio P.6, a 1927 Italian catapult-launched reconnaissance floatplane
- PZL P.6, a 1930 Polish fighter

== See also ==
- P600 (neuroscience), an event-related potential
- 6P (disambiguation)
- PPPPPP (disambiguation)
