= Inclusion-cell =

Diseased cells with many inert aggregates

In cell biology, inclusion-cells, abbreviated as I-cells, are abnormal fibroblasts having a large number of dark inclusions in the cytoplasm of the cell (mainly in the central area). Inclusion bodies are nuclear or cytoplasmic aggregates of stainable substances, usually proteins. These metabolically-inactive aggregates are not enclosed by a membrane, and are composed of fats, proteins, carbohydrates, pigments, and excretory products. When cells have an abundance of these inclusions, they are called I-cells and are associated with neurodegenerative diseases. They are seen in Mucolipidosis II, and Mucolipidosis III, also called inclusion-cell disease or I-cell disease, where lysosomal enzyme transport and storage is affected.

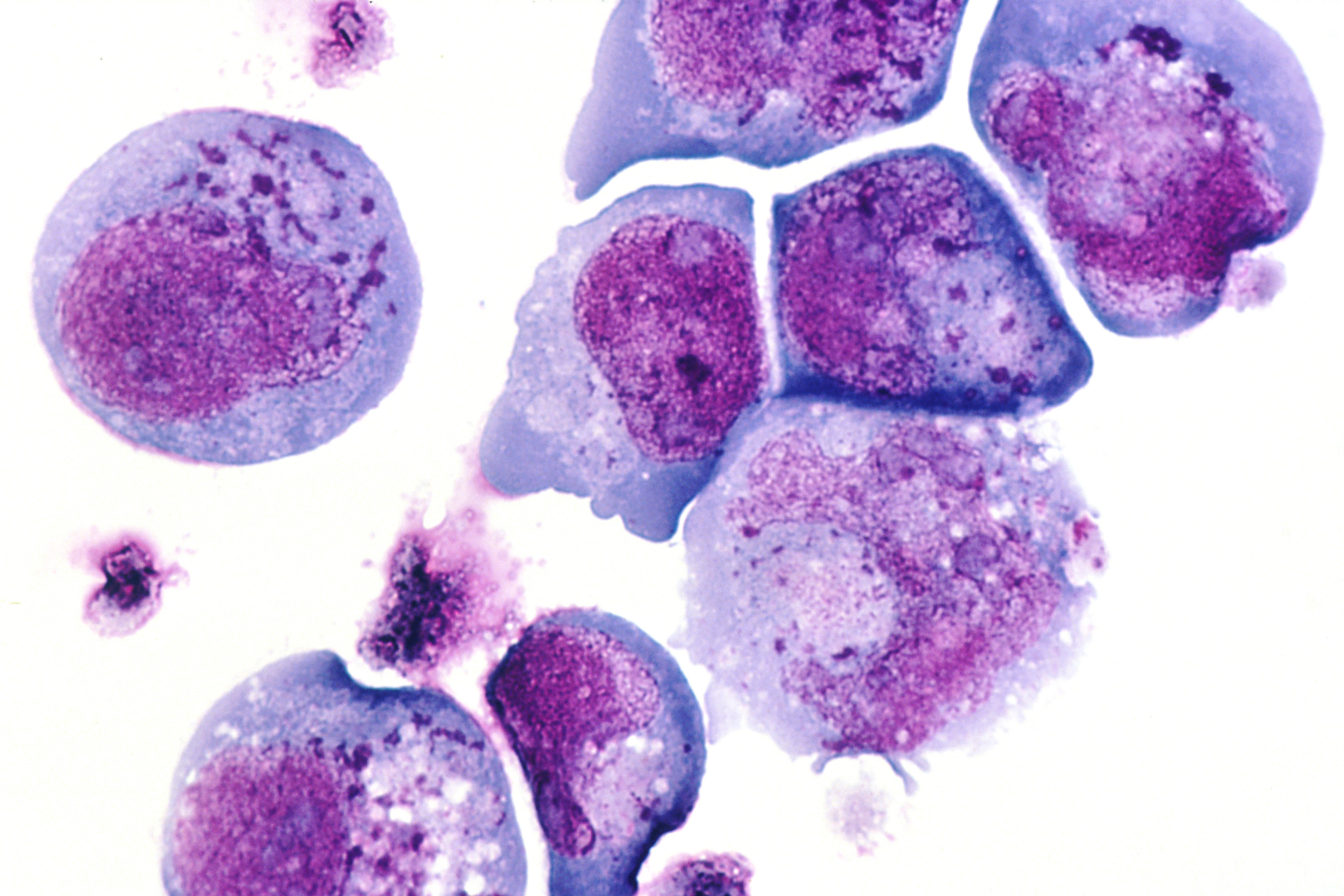
Histological slide of the human herpesvirus 6 showing infected cells, with inclusion bodies in both the nucleus and the cytoplasm.

Inclusion bodies were first described in the late 19th and 20th centuries. One of the earliest figures associated with the discovery of inclusion bodies is Fritz Heinrich Jakob Lewy. He discovered peculiar inclusions in neurons of certain brain nuclei in patients with Paralysis agitans, which would later be coined “Lewy bodies” by Gonzalo Rodriguez Lafora. This discovery is one of the most famous early observations of inclusion bodies.

== Causes and genetics ==
In inclusion-cell disease, the inclusions form due to a defect in the sorting of enzymes to the lysosomes, where waste materials are broken down. This defect is caused by a mutation in the GNPTAB gene in the enzyme N-acetylglucosamine-1-phosphotransferase. This leads to a failure to tag the lysosomal enzymes with mannose-6-phosphate. Without this tag, the enzymes cannot be delivered correctly to the lysosomes, and waste materials are stored as inclusions rather than degraded. These inclusions disrupt cellular functions and cause symptoms like developmental delays, abnormal growth, coarse facial features, and enlarged organs. This mutation is inherited in an autosomal recessive manner, so both parents must be carriers of one copy of the mutated gene in order for kin to develop this condition.

== Clinical features ==
Inclusion-cell disease is associated with various clinical features that affect physical appearance, organ function, and growth development. The severity of these symptoms varies between individuals, though the prognosis is poor due to the disease's systemic nature. I-Cell Disease patients may also experience impaired cognitive and motor development. Individuals may also possess coarse facial features like a prominent forehead, flat nasal bridge, or thickened skin.

Skeletal abnormalities such as dysostosis multiplex or short stature are also common. Organ functioning may be affected by hepatosplenomegaly, the enlargement of the liver and spleen, or cardiac issues like valvular abnormalities. The disease may manifest neurologically in cognitive impairments or seizures, or in joint and limb issues such as arthropathy, a progressive joint pain and stiffness.

Other possible symptoms of the disease include gastrointestinal problems, vision or hearing issues, immunological concerns (increased infection risk), and a shortened life expectancy. Mucolipidosis II is more severe than Mucolipidosis III, and generally results in death of the patient in the first 10 years of life.

== Diagnosis ==
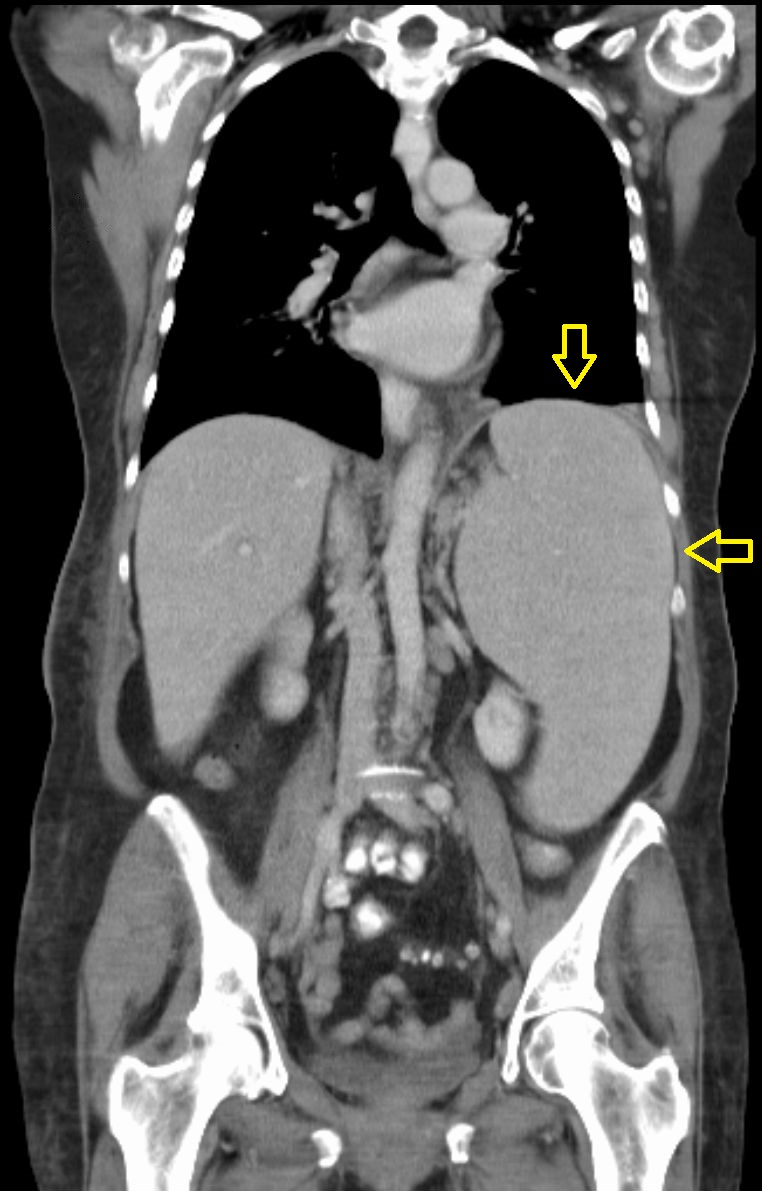
CT scan in a patient with chronic lymphocytic leukemia, showing splenomegaly. Yellow arrows point at the spleen.

To diagnose inclusion-cell disease, specialists conduct a combination of clinical evaluations, biochemical tests, and genetic analyses. First, physicians consider the patient's medical history for any symptoms like growth delays, coarse facial features, organ enlargement, or skeletal abnormalities. These initial examinations commonly reveal features like hepatosplenomegaly, joint stiffness, or dysostosis multiplex.

The next method to diagnose the disease is to consider biochemical tests such as measuring the activity of the lysosomal enzymes in blood or urine. In individuals with the disease, specific enzymes (like β-glucuronidase and N-acetylgalactosamine-4-sulfatase) appear in higher concentrations with decreased activity (due to mislocalization). Urine tests may also reveal elevated levels of glycosaminoglycans (GAGs), complex carbohydrates that accumulate in lysosomal storage disorders. Additionally, specific enzyme assays can be used to assess lysosomal enzyme activity.

If the biochemical tests reveal lysosomal enzyme activity that suggest I-Cell Disease, specialists perform genetic testing to identify any GNPTAB gene mutations. To identify specific mutations, physicians may use Sanger sequencing or next-generation sequencing methods. Family members may also undergo genetic testing to determine carrier status. X-rays and ultrasounds may also be utilized to evaluate skeletal or organ abnormalities, and MRI or CT scans may be utilized to examine brain structure in individuals experiencing neurological symptoms. Occasionally, a biopsy of affected tissues may reveal inclusion bodies in the cells.

A proper diagnosis aims to differentiate inclusion-cell disease from other lysosomal storage disorders, which proves to be difficult due to their similar clinical features. Identification of specific enzyme deficiencies and genetic testing help establish the correct diagnosis. These diagnoses are essential to manage symptoms of the disease, though there is no known cure.

== Treatment options ==
Because there is no cure, the treatment focus remains on supportive care and management strategies to alleviate symptoms to improve quality of life. A multidisciplinary approach is necessary for management of the disease due to its multisystem nature. A team of healthcare professionals are generally involved, including geneticists, neurologists, orthopedic specialists, and physical therapists.

Physical and occupational therapy are used to address mobility issues. These therapies help to manage joint stiffness, promote motor functioning, and increase muscle strength. Sometimes, surgical interventions may be necessary to repair skeletal deformities or relieve joint pain. Nutritional support is also used to combat feeding difficulties or growth delays in affected individuals. This nutritional support allows for specific dietary plans or the use of feeding tubes.

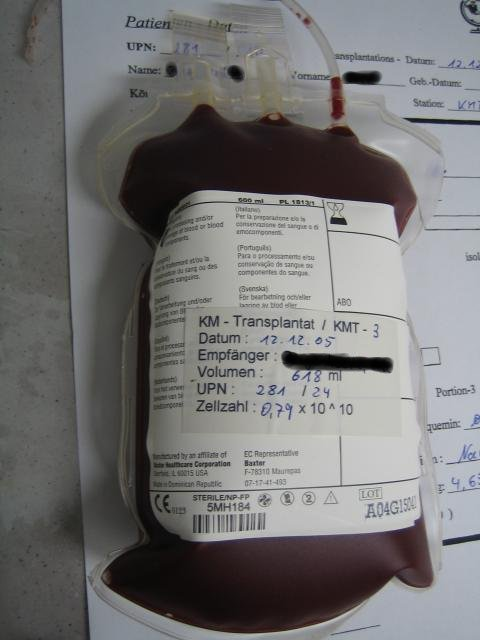
A bag with bone marrow stem cells ready to be used for transplant

Regular management of complications such as cardiac or respiratory issues is crucial. Along with physical therapies, counseling is utilized for affected individuals and families to provide emotional support. More targeted therapies such as enzyme replacement and gene therapy are being researched in hopes of discovering more effective treatments. One study examining the outcomes of hematopoietic stem cell transplantation in mucolipidosis II patients found that after hematopoietic stem cell transplantation, the patient's skin roughness was significantly improved, limb muscle tension was significantly reduced, and gross and fine motor skills were improved.

== Research and future directions ==
Research on inclusion-cell disease focuses on understanding underlying mechanisms of the disorder in hopes of developing additional treatments. Enzyme replacement therapy (ERT) aims to supplement the deficient lysosomal enzymes which are not correctly trafficked to the lysosomes in individuals with the disease. ERT could reduce the accumulation of undegraded materials within the cells, helping to alleviate associated symptoms.

Along with ERT, researchers are exploring gene therapy, which aims to correct GNPTAB gene mutations. Gene editing technologies like CRISPR/Cas9 are being improved, offering hope in potentially restoring normal enzyme functioning. Small molecule drugs can also enhance activity of enzyme function and improve trafficking of lysosomal enzymes, and are being investigated as potential treatments for the disease.

Researchers are also studying the pathophysiological mechanisms of I-Cell Disease to understand how substrate accumulation leads to cellular dysfunction. This understanding could aid in the development of therapies and treatments that address specific affected pathways. Research institutions, patient advocacy groups, and biopharmaceutical companies must cooperate in order to more fully understand and treat the disease. Ongoing research shows promise in improving treatment options for I-Cell Disease and patient outcomes.
