= Insulin-like growth factor 2 receptor =

Protein found in humans

IGF2R
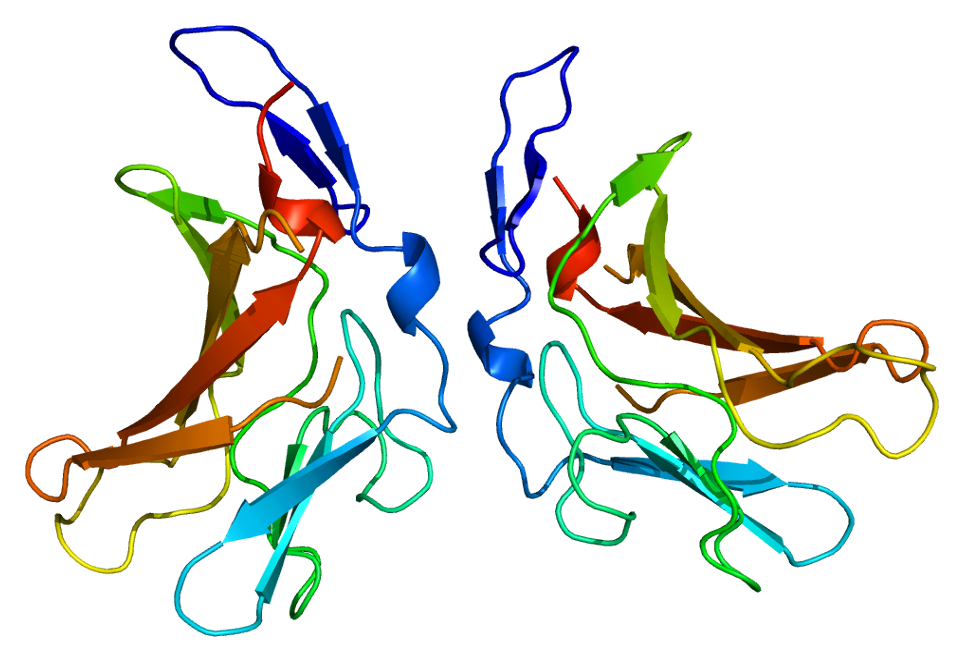

Identifiers
- Aliases: IGF2R, CD222, CIMPR, M6P-R, MPR1, MPRI, M6P/MPR 300, CI-M6PR, MPR300, insulin like growth factor 2 receptor
- External IDs: OMIM: 147280; MGI: 96435; GeneCards: IGF2R
Available structures
PDB	Ortholog search: PDBe RCSB
PDB	List of PDB id codes 1E6F, 1GP0, 1GP3, 1GQB, 1JPL, 1JWG, 1LF8, 2CNJ, 2V5N, 2V5O, 2V5P, 2L29, 2L2A, 2M68, 5IEI, 2M6T

Gene location (Human)
Chr.	Chromosome 6 (human)
Band	6q25.3	Start	159,969,082 bp
Band	6q25.3	End	160,113,507 bp

Gene location (Mouse)
Chr.	Chromosome 17 (mouse)
Band	17 A1|17 8.64 cM	Start	12,901,293 bp
Band	17 A1|17 8.64 cM	End	12,988,551 bp
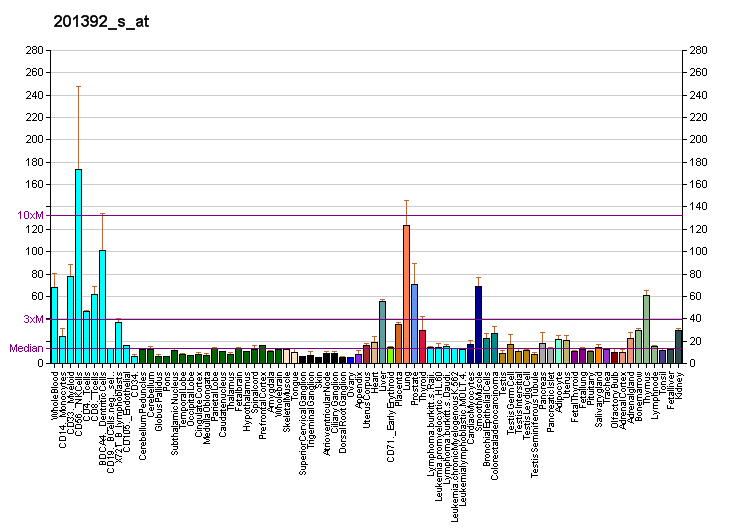

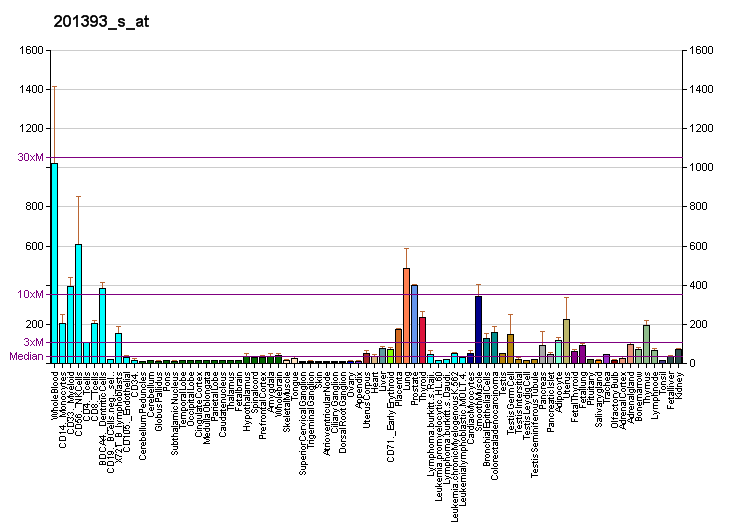
RNA expression pattern
Bgee	Human / Mouse (ortholog); Top expressed in: stromal cell of endometrium; gastrocnemius muscle; granulocyte; blood; muscle of thigh; tibialis anterior muscle; monocyte; spleen; upper lobe of left lung; right adrenal cortex / Top expressed in: atrium; umbilical cord; atrioventricular valve; internal carotid artery; endocardial cushion; lacrimal gland; epithelium of small intestine; human fetus; left lung lobe; Ileal epithelium; More reference expression data
BioGPS	More reference expression data
Gene ontology
Molecular function	retinoic acid binding; insulin-like growth factor binding; G protein-coupled receptor activity; transporter activity; phosphoprotein binding; insulin-like growth factor-activated receptor activity; insulin-like growth factor II binding; mannose binding; identical protein binding; enzyme binding; G-protein alpha-subunit binding; protein binding; kringle domain binding; signaling receptor activity
Cellular component	cytoplasm; integral component of membrane; endosome; late endosome; membrane; focal adhesion; clathrin coat; endocytic vesicle; integral component of plasma membrane; cell surface; lysosomal membrane; trans-Golgi network; early endosome; nuclear envelope lumen; perinuclear region of cytoplasm; trans-Golgi network transport vesicle; lysosome; extracellular exosome; nucleus; trans-Golgi network membrane; transport vesicle; extracellular space; Golgi apparatus; plasma membrane; clathrin-coated vesicle membrane; secretory granule membrane; clathrin-coated vesicle
Biological process	regulation of apoptotic process; G protein-coupled receptor signaling pathway; response to retinoic acid; post-embryonic development; receptor-mediated endocytosis; animal organ regeneration; spermatogenesis; positive regulation of apoptotic process; liver development; signal transduction; insulin-like growth factor receptor signaling pathway; neutrophil degranulation; membrane organization; transport; post-Golgi vesicle-mediated transport; lysosomal transport
Sources:Amigo / QuickGO
Orthologs
Databases	NCBI: entry; OMA: entry
Species	Human	Mouse
Entrez	3482	16004
Ensembl	ENSG00000197081	ENSMUSG00000023830
UniProt	P11717	Q07113
RefSeq (mRNA)	NM_000876	NM_010515
RefSeq (protein)	NP_000867	NP_034645
Location (UCSC)	Chr 6: 159.97 – 160.11 Mb	Chr 17: 12.9 – 12.99 Mb
PubMed search
- Wikidata
View/Edit Human	View/Edit Mouse

Insulin-like growth factor 2 receptor (IGF2R), also called the cation-independent mannose-6-phosphate receptor (CI-MPR) is a protein that in humans is encoded by the IGF2R gene. IGF2R is a multifunctional protein receptor that binds insulin-like growth factor 2 (IGF2) at the cell surface and mannose-6-phosphate (M6P)-tagged proteins in the trans-Golgi network.

== Structure ==
The structure of the IGF2R is a type I transmembrane protein (that is, it has a single transmembrane domain with its C-terminus on the cytoplasmic side of lipid membranes) with a large extracellular/lumenal domain and a relatively short cytoplasmic tail. The extracellular domain consists of a small region homologous to the collagen-binding domain of fibronectin and of fifteen repeats of approximately 147 amino acid residues. Each of these repeats is homologous to the 157-residue extracytoplasmic domain of the mannose 6-phosphate receptor. Binding to IGF2 is mediated through one of the repeats, while two different repeats are responsible for binding to mannose-6-phosphate. The IGF2R is approximately 300 kDa in size; it appears to exist and function as a dimer.

== Function ==
IGF2R functions to clear IGF2 from the cell surface to attenuate signalling, and to transport lysosomal acid hydrolase precursors from the Golgi apparatus to the lysosome. After binding IGF2 at the cell surface, IGF2Rs accumulate in forming clathrin-coated vesicles and are internalized. In the lumen of the trans-Golgi network, the IGF2R binds M6P-tagged cargo. The IGF2Rs (bound to their cargo) are recognized by the GGA family of clathrin adaptor proteins and accumulate in forming clathrin-coated vesicles. IGF2Rs from both the cell surface and the Golgi are trafficked to the early endosome where, in the relatively low pH environment of the endosome, the IGF2Rs release their cargo. The IGF2Rs are recycled back to the Golgi by the retromer complex, again by way of interaction with GGAs and vesicles. The cargo proteins are then trafficked to the lysosome via the late endosome independently of the IGF2Rs.

== Interactions ==
Insulin-like growth factor 2 receptor has been shown to interact with M6PRBP1.

== Evolution ==
The insulin-like growth factor 2 receptor function evolved from the cation-independent mannose 6-phosphate receptor and is first seen in Monotremes. The IGF-2 binding site was likely acquired fortuitously with the generation of an exonic splice site enhancer cluster in exon 34, presumably necessitated by several kilobases of repeat element insertions in the preceding intron. A six-fold affinity maturation then followed during therian evolution, coincident with the onset of imprinting and consistent with the theory of parental conflict.

== See also ==
- Cluster of differentiation
- IGF-1 Receptor
- Mannose 6-phosphate receptor
