= 6P =

6P or 6-P may refer to:

- 6P, IATA code for Club Air
- 6P/d'Arrest, a periodic comet
- 6-P, abbreviation for 6-phosphate
  - Mannose 6-phosphate
  - Mannose 6-phosphate receptor
  - Glucose 6-phosphate
  - Glucose-6-phosphate dehydrogenase
- F9F-6P, a model of Grumman F-9 Cougar
- 6P, former abbreviation for LMS Patriot Class, and a Classification of steam locomotives by British Railways, denoting a locomotive rated for Passenger trains
- 6P, NASA code for Progress M1-7
- 6p, an arm of Chromosome 6 (human)
- Nexus 6P, a smartphone manufactured by Huawei
- Renault 6P, an aircraft engine designed by Renault in the 1920s
- 6P, the production code for the 1984 Doctor Who serial Resurrection of the Daleks
- 6P, the group name for the 6P modular connector which contains 6P2C, 6P4C and 6P6C.
- 6, P, the citation form of Perri 6

== See also ==
- P6 (disambiguation)
- PPPPPP (disambiguation)
