= HAT-P-5b =

Extrasolar planet

HAT-P-5 b / Kráľomoc
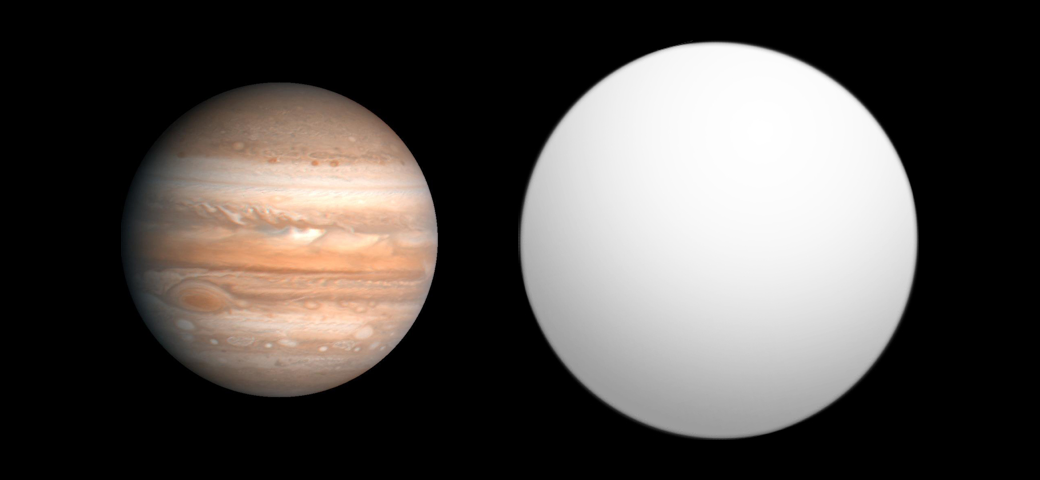
- Size comparison of HAT-P-5 b with Jupiter.

Discovery
- Discovered by: Bakos et al.
- Discovery date: October 9, 2007
- Detection method: transit

Orbital characteristics
- Semi-major axis: 0.04075 ± 0.00076 AU (6,096,000 ± 114,000 km)
- Eccentricity: 0
- Orbital period (sidereal): 2.788491 ± 2.5e-5 d
- Inclination: 86.75 ± 0.44
- Star: HAT-P-5

Physical characteristics
- Mean radius: 1.204±0.017 R_{J}
- Mass: 0.989±0.053 M_{J}
- Mean density: 0.66 ± 0.11 g/cm^{3}
- Temperature: 1485^{+109}_{−118}

HAT-P-5 b is a transiting extrasolar planet located approximately 1000 light-years away in the constellation of Lyra, orbiting the star HAT-P-5. It is a hot Jupiter with a mass 6% greater than Jupiter and a radius 26% greater than Jupiter, corresponding to a density of 0.66 g/cm_{3}, which is less than water. This planet was found by Bakos et al. on October 9, 2007.

The planet HAT-P-5 b is named Kráľomoc. The name was selected in the NameExoWorlds campaign by Slovakia, during the 100th anniversary of the IAU. Kráľomoc is an ancient Slovak term for the planet Jupiter.

== Physical properties ==
The measured temperature on the planetary dayside is 1485^{+109}_{−118} K.

== See also ==
- HAT-P-4b
- HAT-P-6b
