= Mannokinase =

Identifiers
- EC no.: 2.7.1.7
- CAS no.: 9030-54-0

Databases
- IntEnz: IntEnz view
- BRENDA: BRENDA entry
- ExPASy: NiceZyme view
- KEGG: KEGG entry
- MetaCyc: metabolic pathway
- PRIAM: profile
- PDB structures: RCSB PDB PDBe PDBsum
- Gene Ontology: AmiGO / QuickGO
Search
- PMC: articles
- PubMed: articles
- NCBI: proteins

Mannokinase (EC 2.7.1.7) is an enzyme that catalyzes the chemical reaction

ATP +
mannose
ADP +
mannose 6-phosphate

The enzyme characterised from Schistosoma mansoni converts the hexose sugar, L-mannose (shown in its cyclic form) to L-mannose 6-phosphate by transferring a phosphate group from the cofactor, adenosine triphosphate (ATP), which is converted to adenosine diphosphate (ADP).

This enzyme is a transferase, specifically one transferring phosphorus-containing groups (phosphotransferases) with an alcohol group as acceptor. The systematic name of this enzyme class is ATP:D-mannose 6-phosphotransferase. Other names in common use include mannokinase (phosphorylating), and D-fructose (D-mannose) kinase.
