= Sterrennacht =

Sterrennacht may refer to:

- De sterrennacht, Dutch original title of The Starry Night, a 1889 painting by Van Gogh.
- Sterrennacht, official name of star HAT-P-6.
