= Nachtwacht =

Nachtwacht may refer to:

- De Nachtwacht, Dutch original title of The Night Watch, a 1642 painting by Rembrandt.
- Nachtwacht, official name of exoplanet HAT-P-6 b.
