= HAT-P-5 =

G-type star

Observation data Epoch J2000.0 Equinox ICRS
- Constellation: Lyra
- Right ascension: 18^{h} 17^{m} 37.3127^{s}
- Declination: +36° 37′ 17.170″
- Apparent magnitude (V): +11.95

Characteristics
- Evolutionary stage: main sequence
- Spectral type: G1V
- Variable type: planetary transit

Astrometry
Radial velocity (R_{v})	8.56±1.11 km/s
Proper motion (μ)	RA: 11.925(11) mas/yr Dec.: 5.904(14) mas/yr
Parallax (π)	3.2184±0.0105 mas
Distance	1,013 ± 3 ly (311 ± 1 pc)

Details
Mass	1.157+0.043 −0.081 M_{☉}
Radius	1.165+0.046 −0.052 R_{☉}
Surface gravity (log g)	4.37 ± 0.03 cgs
Temperature	5863 ± 80 K
Metallicity [Fe/H]	0.10 ± 0.10 dex
Rotational velocity (v sin i)	2.8 ± 1.0 km/s
Age	2.6+2.1 −1.4 Gyr

Other designations
- Chasoň, TOI-2135, TIC 76419763, TYC 2634-1087-1, GSC 02634-01087, 2MASS J18173731+3637170, HAT-P-5

Database references
SIMBAD	data
Exoplanet Archive	data

HAT-P-5 is a 12th magnitude star in the constellation Lyra, approximately 1,000 light years away from Earth. It is a spectral type G star, about 1.16 solar masses and radii greater than the Sun, and only 200 kelvins hotter. It is estimated to be 2.6 billion years old.

The star HAT-P-5 is named Chasoň. The name was selected in the NameExoWorlds campaign by Slovakia, during the 100th anniversary of the IAU. Chasoň is an ancient Slovak term for the Sun.

== Planetary system ==
On October 9, 2007, a report was submitted to The Astrophysical Journal Letters telling of the discovery of an exoplanet transiting HAT-P-5. The planet was described as a Jupiter-like hot Jupiter, with a radius about one and one quarter times that of Jupiter, and nearly the same mass. Its density was reported as 0.66 ± 0.11 g/cm^{3}, and its inclination 86.75 ± 0.44°.

The HAT-P-5 planetary system
Companion (in order from star)	Mass	Semimajor axis (AU)	Orbital period (days)	Eccentricity	Inclination (°)	Radius
b / Kráľomoc	1.02±0.10 M_{J}	0.04073+0.00050 −0.00093	2.78847360(52)	<0.072	86.75±0.44	1.204±0.017 R_{J}

== See also ==
- HAT-P-4
- HAT-P-6
- List of extrasolar planets
