= Mannose-6-phosphate 6-reductase =

Class of enzymes

mannose-6-phosphate 6-reductase

Identifiers
- EC no.: 1.1.1.224
- CAS no.: 88747-79-9

Databases
- BRENDA: enzyme data
- ExPASy: NiceZyme view
- KEGG: enzyme entry
- MetaCyc: metabolic pathway
- Rhea: reactions
- PDB structures: RCSB PDB PDBe PDBsum
- Gene Ontology: AmiGO / QuickGO
Search
- PMC: articles
- PubMed: articles
- NCBI: proteins

In enzymology, a mannose-6-phosphate 6-reductase (EC 1.1.1.224) is an enzyme that catalyzes the chemical reaction

D-mannitol 1-phosphate + NADP^{+} $\rightleftharpoons$ D-mannose 6-phosphate + NADPH + H^{+}

Thus, the two substrates of this enzyme are D-mannitol 1-phosphate and NADP^{+}, whereas its 3 products are D-mannose 6-phosphate, NADPH, and H^{+}.

This enzyme belongs to the family of oxidoreductases, specifically those acting on the CH-OH group of donor with NAD^{+} or NADP^{+} as acceptor. The systematic name of this enzyme class is D-mannitol-1-phosphate:NADP^{+} 6-oxidoreductase. Other names in common use include NADPH-dependent mannose 6-phosphate reductase, mannose-6-phosphate reductase, 6-phosphomannose reductase, NADP^{+}-dependent mannose-6-P:mannitol-1-P oxidoreductase, NADPH-dependent M6P reductase, and NADPH-mannose-6-P reductase.
