= GNPTG =

Protein-coding gene in the species Homo sapiens

Identifiers
- Aliases: GNPTG, C16orf27, GNPTAG, LP2537, RJD9, N-acetylglucosamine-1-phosphate transferase gamma subunit, N-acetylglucosamine-1-phosphate transferase subunit gamma
- External IDs: OMIM: 607838; MGI: 2147006; HomoloGene: 13047; GeneCards: GNPTG; OMA:GNPTG - orthologs

Gene location (Human)
Chr.	Chromosome 16 (human)
Band	16p13.3	Start	1,351,931 bp
Band	16p13.3	End	1,365,737 bp

Gene location (Mouse)
Chr.	Chromosome 17 (mouse)
Band	17|17 A3.3	Start	25,452,305 bp
Band	17|17 A3.3	End	25,459,098 bp
RNA expression pattern
Bgee	Human / Mouse (ortholog); Top expressed in: right adrenal cortex; left adrenal gland; left adrenal cortex; C1 segment; Brodmann area 9; cingulate gyrus; anterior cingulate cortex; prefrontal cortex; Amygdala; Hypothalamus / Top expressed in: right kidney; neural layer of retina; superior frontal gyrus; primary visual cortex; parotid gland; cerebellar cortex; dentate gyrus of hippocampal formation granule cell; yolk sac; neural tube; lateral septal nucleus; More reference expression data
BioGPS	n/a
Gene ontology
Molecular function	UDP-N-acetylglucosamine-lysosomal-enzyme N-acetylglucosaminephosphotransferase activity; protein homodimerization activity
Cellular component	extracellular region; Golgi membrane; Golgi apparatus; extracellular exosome; membrane; intracellular membrane-bounded organelle
Biological process	N-glycan processing to lysosome; carbohydrate phosphorylation
Sources:Amigo / QuickGO
Orthologs
Species	Human	Mouse
Entrez	84572	214505
Ensembl	ENSG00000090581	ENSMUSG00000035521
UniProt	Q9UJJ9	Q6S5C2
RefSeq (mRNA)	NM_032520	NM_172529; NM_001346737
RefSeq (protein)	NP_115909	NP_001333666; NP_766117
Location (UCSC)	Chr 16: 1.35 – 1.37 Mb	Chr 17: 25.45 – 25.46 Mb
PubMed search
- Wikidata
View/Edit Human	View/Edit Mouse

GNPTG (“N-acetylglucosamine-1-phosphate transferase, gamma subunit.”) is a gene in the human body. It is one of three genes that were found to correlate with stuttering.

== Function ==
The GNPTG gene codes instructions for making the gamma subunit of an enzyme called GlcNAc-1-phosphotransferase (also called N-acetylglucosamine-1-phosphate transferase). This enzyme is made up of two alpha (α), two beta (β), and two gamma (γ) subunits. GNPTAB produces the alpha and beta subunits. GlcNAc-1-phosphotransferase functions to prepare newly made enzymes for lysosome transportation (lysosomal hydrolases to the lysosome). Lysosomes, a part of an animal cells, helps break down large molecules into smaller ones that can be reused. GlcNAc-1-phosphotransferase catalyzes the N-linked glycosylation of asparagine residues with a molecule called mannose-6-phosphate (M6P). M6P acts as indicator whether a hydrolase should be transported to the lysosome or not. Once a hydrolase has the indication from an M6P, it can be transported to a lysosome.
