= Back-Fusion =

Process in cellular biology

Back-fusion is the fusion of internal (intraluminal) vesicles within multivesicular bodies or late endosomes with the endosome's limiting membrane. The process is believed to be mediated by lysobisphosphatidic acid (LBPA), phosphatidylinositol-3-phosphate, Alix, and an apparent dependence on an acidic pH. MHC class 2 and other proteins (CD63 and MPR) utilize such a process to effectively transport to locations in the cytosol and back to the plasma membrane. However, pathogens also exploit this mechanism to efficiently enter the cytosol of the cell (e.g. VSV, anthrax). Unlike regular fusion in the cell between endosomes and organelles, back-fusion requires the exoplasmic leaflets of the internal vesicles and outer membrane to fuse - similar to sperm-egg fusion.
