= Non-islet cell tumor hypoglycemia =

- Specialty: Oncology

Non-islet cell tumor hypoglycemia is a condition in which a tumor secretes hormones into the bloodstream that cause hypoglycemia. This is most commonly insulin-like growth factor 2, which stimulates insulin receptors to uptake glucose into cells.

Many types of non-islet cell tumors can cause this phenomenon, but not all act through the same mechanism. Rarely, non-islet tumors can secrete IGF-1 or insulin.
