= Mannose 6-phosphate receptor =

Cation-independent mannose-6-phosphate receptor repeat

Identifiers
- Symbol: CIMR
- Pfam: PF00878
- InterPro: IPR000479
- SCOP2: 1e6f / SCOPe / SUPFAM
- Membranome: 30
Available protein structures:
- PDB: IPR000479 PF00878 (ECOD; PDBsum)
- AlphaFold: IPR000479; PF00878

Cation-dependent mannose-6-phosphate receptor

Identifiers
- Symbol: M6PR
- NCBI gene: 4074
- HGNC: 6752
- OMIM: 154540
- RefSeq: NM_002355
- UniProt: P20645

Other data
- Locus: Chr. 12 p13
Search for
- Structures: Swiss-model
- Domains: InterPro

Cation-independent mannose-6 phosphate receptor

Identifiers
- Symbol: IGF2R
- NCBI gene: 3482
- HGNC: 5467
- OMIM: 147280
- RefSeq: NM_000876
- UniProt: P11717

Other data
- Locus: Chr. 6 q25q27
Search for
- Structures: Swiss-model
- Domains: InterPro

The mannose 6-phosphate receptors (MPRs) are transmembrane glycoproteins that target enzymes to lysosomes in vertebrates.

Mannose 6-phosphate receptors bind newly synthesized lysosomal hydrolases in the trans-Golgi network (TGN) and deliver them to pre-lysosomal compartments. There are two different MPRs, one of ~300kDa and a smaller, dimeric receptor of ~46kDa. The larger receptor is known as the cation-independent mannose 6-phosphate receptor (CI-MPR), while the smaller receptor (CD-MPR) requires divalent cations to efficiently recognize lysosomal hydrolases. While divalent cations are not essential for ligand binding by the human CD-MPR, the nomenclature has been retained.

Both of these receptors bind terminal mannose 6-phosphate with similar affinity (CI-MPR = 7 μM, CD-MPR = 8 μM) and have similar signals in their cytoplasmic domains for intracellular trafficking.

== History ==
Elizabeth Neufeld was studying patients who had multiple inclusion bodies present in their cells. Due to the large amount of inclusion bodies she named this condition I-cell disease. These inclusion bodies represented lysosomes that were filled with undigestable material. At first Neufeld thought these patients must have a lack of lysosomal enzymes. . Further study showed that all of the lysosomal enzymes were being made but they were being incorrectly targeted. Instead of being sent to the lysosome, they were being secreted. Furthermore, these mis-targeted enzymes were found to not be phosphorylated. Therefore, Neufeld suggested that I-cell disease was caused by a deficiency in the enzymes that add a specific mannose 6-phosphate tag onto lysosomal enzymes so they can be targeted to the lysosome.

Studies of I-cell disease led to the discovery of the receptors that bind to this specific tag. Firstly the CI-MPR was discovered and isolated through the use of affinity chromatography. However scientists discovered that some of the lysosomal enzymes still reached the lysosome in the absence of the CI-MPR. This led to the identification of another mannose 6-phosphate binding receptor, the CD-MPR, which binds its ligand in the presence of a divalent cation such as Mn^{2+}.

The genes for each receptor have been cloned and characterised. It is thought that they have evolved from the same ancestral gene as there is conservation in some of their intron/ exon borders and there is a homology in their binding domains.

== Function ==
The main function of the MPRs is to target lysosomal enzymes to the lysosome.

=== Mechanism of targeting ===
Lysosomal enzymes are synthesised in the rough endoplasmic reticulum along with a range of other secretory proteins. A specific recognition tag has evolved to prevent these harmful lysosomal enzymes from being secreted and to ensure they are targeted to the lysosome. This tag is a mannose 6-phosphate residue.

Once the lysosomal enzyme has been translocated into the rough endoplasmic reticulum an oligosaccharide composed of Glc_{3}Man_{9}GlcNAc_{2} is transferred en bloc to the protein. The oligosaccharide present on lysosomal enzymes is processed in the same manner as other secretory proteins whilst it is translocated from the endoplasmic reticulum to the cis-Golgi.

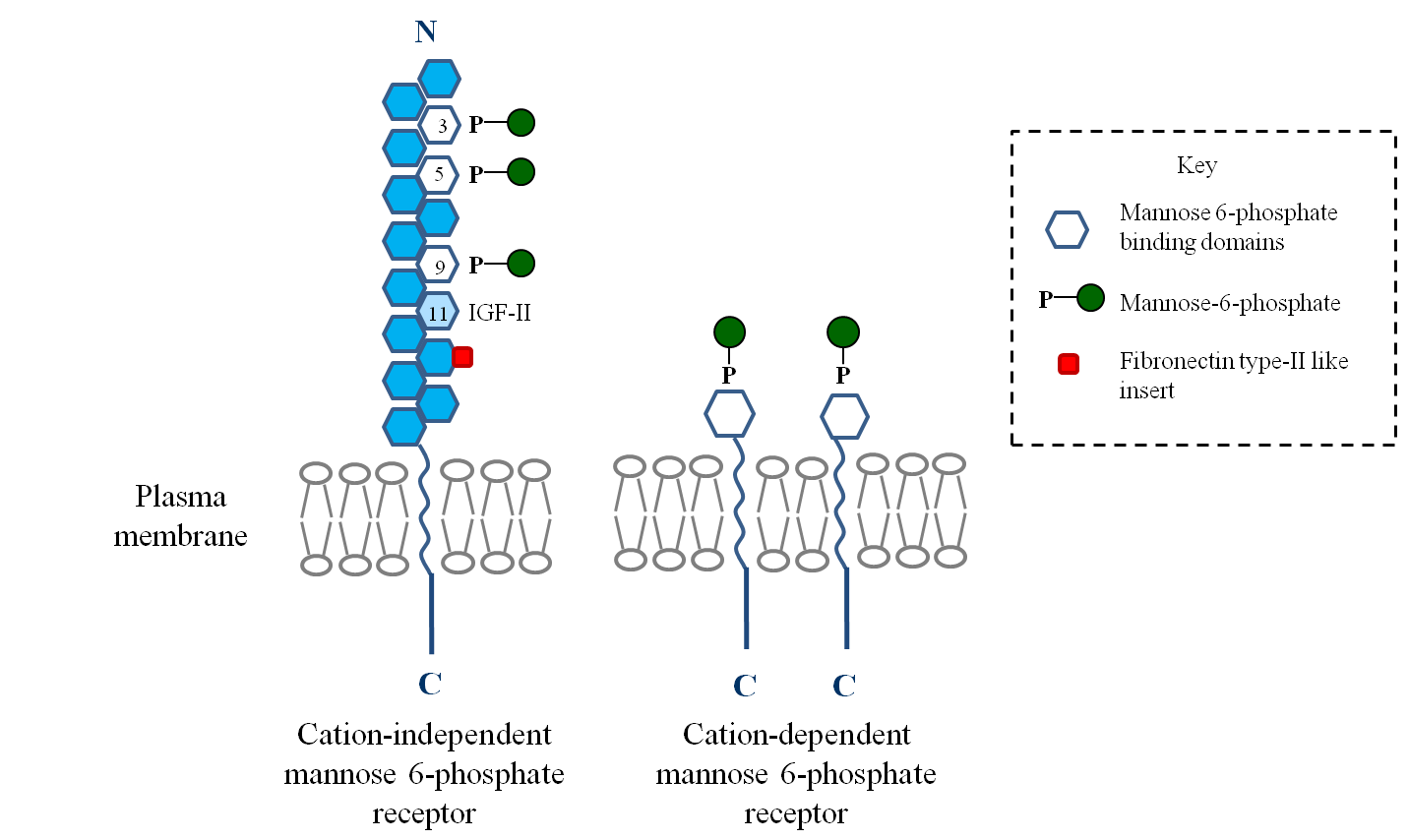
An image displaying the overall structure of the CI-MPR and the CD-MPR. This image has been adapted from an 'Introduction to Glycobiology'

In the Trans-Golgi a GlcNAc phosphotransferase (EC 2.7.8.17) adds a GlcNAc-1-phosphate residue onto the 6-hydroxyl group of a specific mannose residue within the oligosaccharide. This forms a phosphodiester: Man-phosphate-GlcNAc. Once the phosphodiester has been formed the lysosomal enzyme will be translocated through the Golgi apparatus to the trans-Golgi. In the trans-Golgi a phosphodiesterase (EC 3.1.4.45) will remove the GlcNAc residue exposing the mannose 6-phosphate tag, allowing the lysosomal enzymes to bind to the CI-MPR and the CD-MPR. The MPR-lysosomal enzyme complex is translocated to a pre-lysosomal compartment, known as an endosome, in a COPII-coated vesicle. This targeting away from the secretory pathway is achieved by the presence of a specific sorting signal, an acidic cluster/dileucine motif, in the cytoplasmic tails of the MPRs. Both MPRs bind their ligands most effectively at pH 6 – 7; thus enabling the receptors to bind to the lysosomal enzymes in the trans-Golgi and release them in the acidified environment of the endosome. Once the enzyme has dissociated from the mannose 6-phosphate receptor, it is translocated from the endosome to the lysosome where the phosphate tag is removed from the enzyme.

MPRs are not found in the lysosomes; they cycle mainly between the trans-Golgi network and endosomes. The CI-MPR is also present on the cell surface. Around 10-20% of the CI-MPR can be found at the cell membrane. Its function here is to capture any mannose 6-phosphate tagged enzymes that have accidentally entered the secretory pathway. Once it binds to a lysosomal enzyme the receptor becomes internalised rapidly. Internalisation is mediated by a sorting signal in its cytoplasmic tail – a YSKV motif. This ensures that all harmful lysosomal enzymes will be targeted to the lysosome.

=== Knockout mice studies ===
CI-MPR

Mice lacking the CI-MPR die at day 15 of gestation due to cardiac hyperplasia. The mice suffer from abnormal growth because they are unable to regulate the levels of free IGF-II (insulin-like growth factor type II). Death of the mice can be prevented if the IGF-II allele is also knocked out. Further analysis of the embryos also showed that they display defects in the targeting of lysosomal enzymes as they have an increased level of phosphorylated lysosomal enzymes in their amniotic fluid. Approximately 70% of lysosomal enzymes are secreted in the absence of the CI-MPR – this suggests that the CD-MPR is unable to compensate for its loss.

CD-MPR

When the CD-MPR is knocked out in mice they appear healthy apart from the fact that they have defects in the targeting of multiple lysosomal enzymes. These mice display elevated levels of phosphorylated lysosomal enzymes in their blood and they accumulate undigested material in their lysosomes.

From these knockout mice it can be deduced that both receptors are needed for the efficient targeting of lysosomal enzymes. The lysosomal enzymes that are secreted by the two different knockout cell lines form two different sets. This suggests that each MPR interacts preferentially with a subset of lysosomal enzymes.

== Structure ==
The CI-MPR and CD-MPR are structurally distinct receptors however they share an overall general structure as they are both type I integral membrane proteins. Both receptors have a large N-terminal extracytoplasmic domain, one transmembrane domain and a short C-terminal cytoplasmic tail. These cytoplasmic tails contain multiple sorting signals; some of which can be either phosphorylated or palmitoylated.

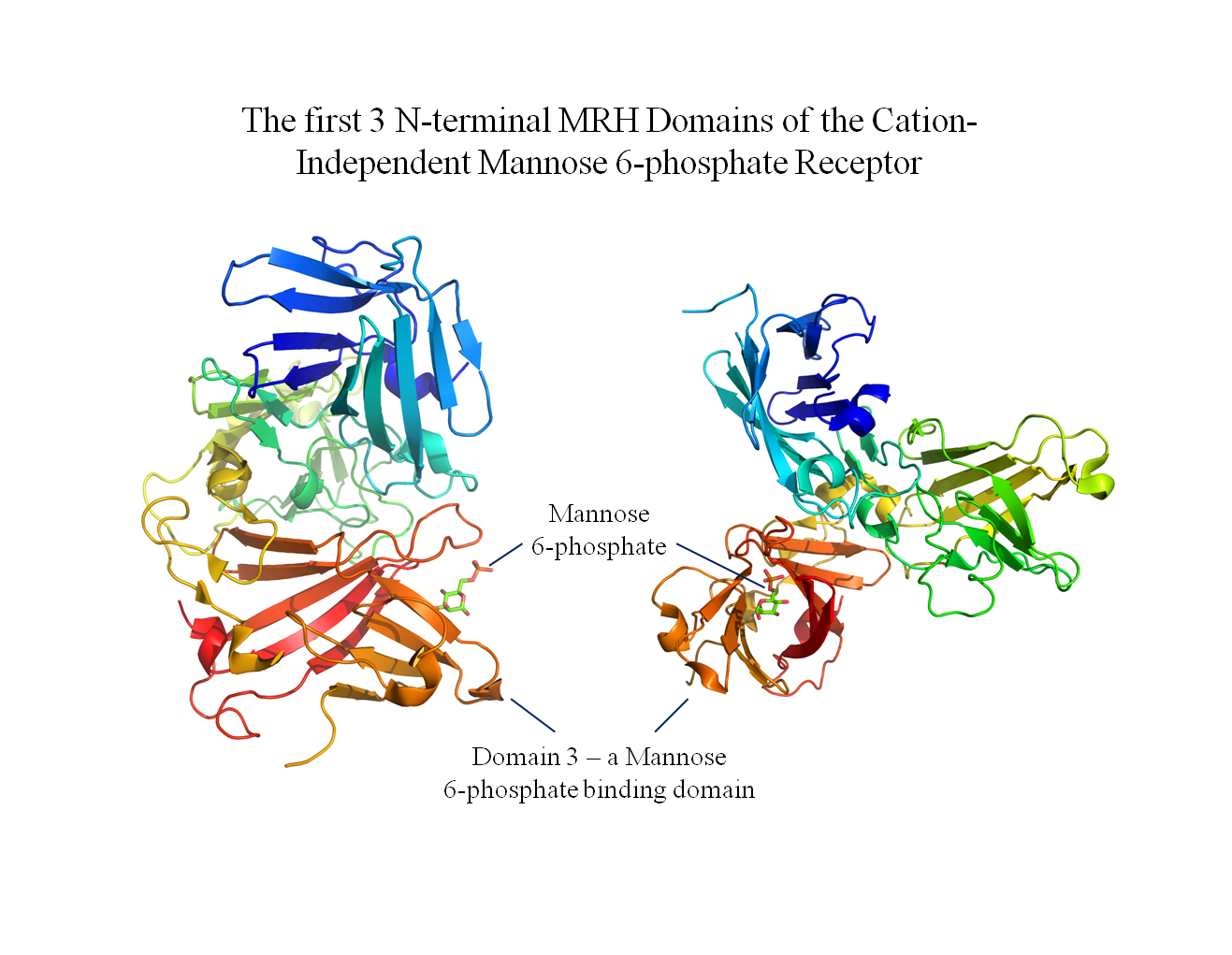
The first 3 N-terminal domains (Domains 1, 2 and 3) of the cation-independent mannose 6-phosphate receptor with its ligand bound. Image generated from PDB file: = 1SZ0 1SZ0 using PyMol.

CI-MPR: The CI-MPR is ~300 kDa. The N-terminal extracytoplasmic domain contains 15 contiguous P-type carbohydrate recognition domains. They are referred to as MRH (mannose 6-phosphate receptor homology) domains. The domains are homologous because they have:

- A similar size - each one has around 150 amino acid residues
- Conserved amino acid residues – between 14 and 38% sequence identity
- Conserved positioning of 6 specific Cysteine residues that are involved in forming disulphide bonds

The structure of 7 out of the 15 domains has been determined, using X-ray crystallography, and they seem to share a similar fold. The CI-MPR exists mainly as a dimer in the membrane. Domains 3, 5 and 9 have been found to bind to mannose 6-phosphate. Domains 3 and 9 can bind to mannose 6-phosphate with high affinity. Domain 5 only binds Man-6-phosphate with a weak affinity. However domain 5 has also been shown to bind to the phosphodiester, Man-phosphate-GlcNAc. This is a safety mechanism for the cell – it means it is able to bind to lysosomal enzymes that have escaped the action of the enzyme that removes the GlcNAc residue. Combining these 3 domains allows the CI-MPR to bind to a wide range of phosphorylated glycan structures. Domain 11 binds to IGF-II.

CD-MPR: The CD-MPR is much smaller than the CI-MPR – it is only ~46 kDa. Its N-terminal extracytoplasmic domain contains only 1 P-type carbohydrate recognition domain. The CD-MPR exists mainly as a dimer in the membrane. However monomeric and tetrameric forms are also thought to exist as well. The equilibrium between these different oligomers is affected by pH, temperature and presence of mannose 6-phosphate residues. Each monomer forms a 9 stranded β-barrel which can bind to a single mannose 6-phosphate residue.

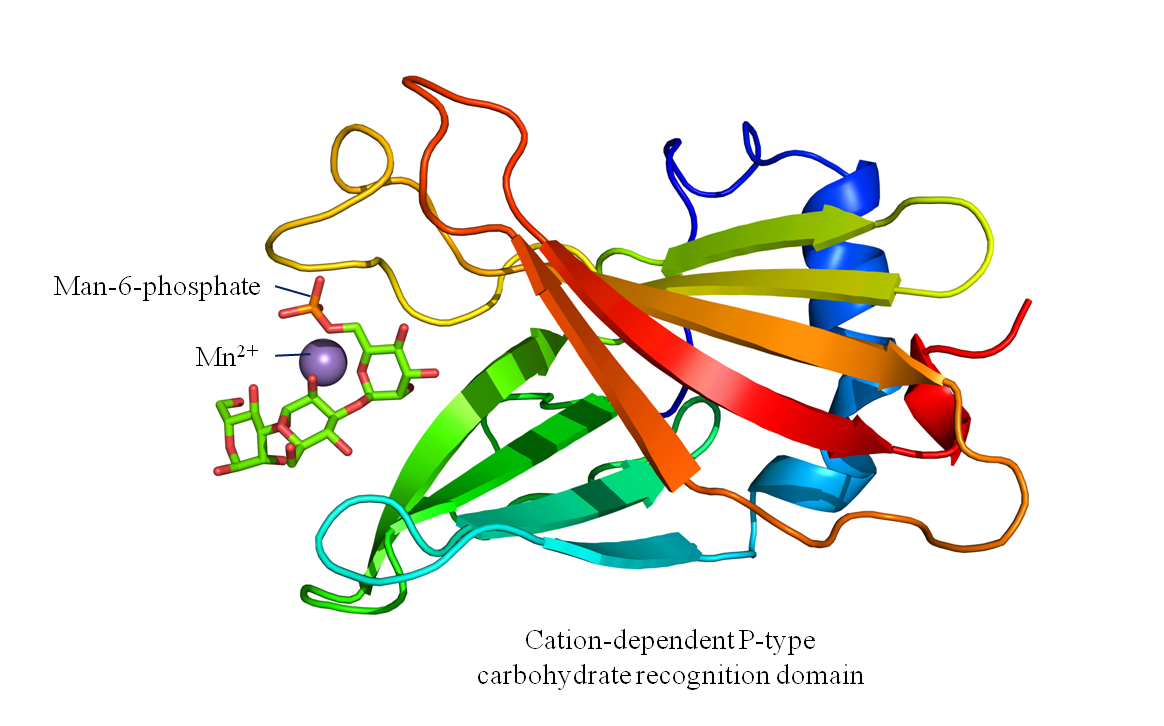
The cation-dependent mannose 6-phosphate receptor with its ligand bound. The purple sphere represents the cation, Mn^{2+}. Image generated from PDB file: = 1C39 1C39 using PyMol.

=== Mannose 6-phosphate binding ===
The CI-MPR and CD-MPR bind mannose 6-phosphate in a similar fashion. Both form a set of hydrogen bonds between key residues and characteristic hydroxyl groups on the mannose residue. Hydrogen bonds to hydroxyl groups at positions 2, 3 and 4 make the site specific for mannose alone.

Both MPRs share 4 residues that are essential for ligand binding. Mutation of any of these residues results in the loss of mannose 6-phosphate binding. These residues are glutamine, arginine, glutamic acid and tyrosine and are responsible for forming the hydrogen bonds that contact specific hydroxyl groups in the mannose residue.

A wide range of N-glycan structures can be present on lysosomal enzymes. These glycans can vary in:

- Type – hybrid or high mannose structures
- Size
- Presence of the phosphomonoester (mannose 6-phosphate) or phosphodiester (Man-phosphate-GlcNAc)
- Number of mannose 6-phosphate tags
- Location of the mannose 6-phosphate tag

The CI-MPR and CD-MPR are able to bind to this wide range of N-glycan structures by having a different binding site architecture. The MPRs also bind to the phosphate group in a slightly different manner. Domain 3 of the CI-MPR uses Ser-386 and an ordered water molecule to bind to the phosphate moiety. On the other hand, the CD-MPR uses residues Asp-103, Asn-104 and His-105 to form favourable hydrogen bonds to the phosphate group. The CD-MPR also contains a divalent cation Mn^{2+} which forms favourable hydrogen bonds with the phosphate moiety.

== CI-MPR and cancer ==
It is well-established that the CI-MPR binds mannose 6-phosphate but there is a growing body of evidence that suggests the CI-MPR also binds to unglycosylated IGF-II. It is thought that when the CI-MPR is present on the cell surface, domain 11 will bind to any IGF-II free in the extracellular matrix. The receptor is then rapidly internalised, along with IGF-II, through a YSKV motif present in the CI-MPR's cytoplasmic tail. IGF-II will then be targeted to the lysosome where it will be degraded. This regulates the level of free IGF-II in the body.

This function of the CI-MPR was determined through the use of knockout mice. It was observed that CI-MPR deficient mice had an increased level of free IGF-II and enlarged organs (around a 30% increase in size). These mice die at day 15 of gestation due to cardiac hyperplasia. Death of the mice could be prevented when the IGF-II allele was also knocked out. When the CI-MPR and the IGF-II allele are knocked out normal mouse growth is observed as there is no longer a growth factor present that needs to be regulated.

Due to CI-MPR's ability to modulate the levels of IGF-II it has been suggested it may play a role as a tumour suppressor. Studies of multiple human cancers have shown that a loss of the CI-MPR function is associated with a progression in tumourigenesis. Loss of heterozygosity (LOH) at the CI-MPR locus has been displayed in multiple cancer types including liver and breast. However this is a relatively new concept and many more studies will have to investigate the relationship between the CI-MPR and cancer.
