= PPPPPP =

PPPPPP, Pppppp, or pppppp may refer to:

- PPPPPP (manga), a manga series serialized in Weekly Shōnen Jump in 2021
- PPPPPP, the soundtrack of the video game VVVVVV
- Pppppp, a book of selected works by Kurt Schwitters, translated by Jerome Rothenberg and Pierre Joris
- pppppp, a rarely used musical dynamic notation for an extremely quiet sound

== See also ==
- 6P (disambiguation)
- PPPPPPP, a United States military acronym for "Proper Prior Planning Prevents Piss Poor Performance"
- Seven Ps, a term in marketing
