= Paramural body =

Paramural bodies are membranous or vesicular structures located between the cell walls and cell membranes of plant and fungal cells. When these are continuous with the cell wall, they are termed lomasomes, while they are referred to as plasmalemmasomes if associated with the plasmalemma.

== Function ==
While their function has not yet been studied in great detail, it has been speculated that due to the morphological similarity of paramural bodies to the exosomes produced by mammalian cells, they may perform similar functions such as membrane vesicle trafficking between cells. Current evidence suggests that, like exosomes, paramural bodies are derived from multivesicular bodies.

== See also ==
- Endosome
- Golgi apparatus
