= Insulin-like growth factor 2 =

Protein hormone

IGF2
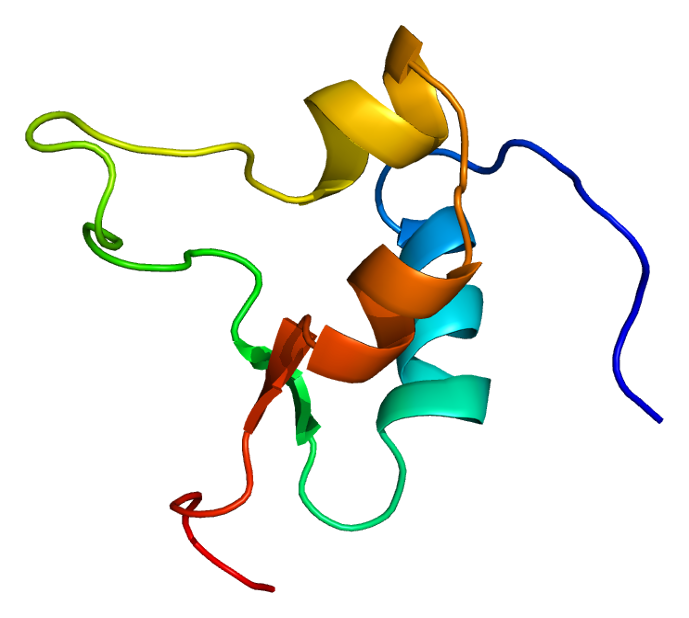

Identifiers
- Aliases: IGF2, C11orf43, GRDF, IGF-II, PP9974, insulin like growth factor 2, SRS3
- External IDs: OMIM: 147470; MGI: 96434; GeneCards: IGF2
Available structures
PDB	Ortholog search: PDBe RCSB
PDB	List of PDB id codes 3KR3, 1IGL, 2L29, 2V5P, 3E4Z

Gene location (Human)
Chr.	Chromosome 11 (human)
Band	11p15.5	Start	2,129,112 bp
Band	11p15.5	End	2,158,391 bp

Gene location (Mouse)
Chr.	Chromosome 7 (mouse)
Band	7 F5|7 87.99 cM	Start	142,204,503 bp
Band	7 F5|7 87.99 cM	End	142,220,553 bp

RNA expression pattern
Bgee	Human / Mouse (ortholog); Top expressed in: placenta; sural nerve; stromal cell of endometrium; right lobe of liver; apex of heart; left uterine tube; muscle of thigh; right uterine tube; canal of the cervix; left ventricle / Top expressed in: extraembryonic membrane; yolk sac; genital tubercle; placenta; tail of embryo; neural tube; dentate gyrus of hippocampal formation granule cell; intra-embryonic coelom; rhombencephalon; mesencephalon; More reference expression data
BioGPS	More reference expression data
Gene ontology
Molecular function	insulin receptor binding; hormone activity; protein binding; growth factor activity; insulin-like growth factor receptor binding; integrin binding; protein serine/threonine kinase activator activity; receptor ligand activity
Cellular component	extracellular region; platelet alpha granule lumen; extracellular space
Biological process	regulation of gene expression by genetic imprinting; skeletal system development; insulin receptor signaling pathway; positive regulation of protein kinase B signaling; regulation of transcription, DNA-templated; ossification; platelet degranulation; multicellular organism development; glucose metabolic process; positive regulation of mitotic nuclear division; positive regulation of cell division; positive regulation of MAPK cascade; positive regulation of activated T cell proliferation; positive regulation of protein serine/threonine kinase activity; carbohydrate metabolic process; regulation of signaling receptor activity; negative regulation of transcription by RNA polymerase II; osteoblast differentiation; in utero embryonic development; embryonic placenta development; positive regulation of protein phosphorylation; positive regulation of cell population proliferation; animal organ morphogenesis; exocrine pancreas development; regulation of histone modification; insulin receptor signaling pathway via phosphatidylinositol 3-kinase; positive regulation of multicellular organism growth; positive regulation of catalytic activity; positive regulation of glycogen biosynthetic process; positive regulation of transcription by RNA polymerase II; positive regulation of insulin receptor signaling pathway; positive regulation of peptidyl-tyrosine phosphorylation; striated muscle cell differentiation; regulation of muscle cell differentiation; embryonic placenta morphogenesis; positive regulation of glycogen (starch) synthase activity
Sources:Amigo / QuickGO
Orthologs
Databases	NCBI: entry; OMA: entry
Species	Human	Mouse
Entrez	3481	16002
Ensembl	ENSG00000167244	ENSMUSG00000048583
UniProt	P01344	P09535
RefSeq (mRNA)	NM_001291862; NM_000612; NM_001007139; NM_001127598; NM_001291861	NM_001122736; NM_001122737; NM_010514; NM_001315488; NM_001315489
RefSeq (protein)	NP_000603; NP_001007140; NP_001121070; NP_001278790; NP_001278791	NP_001116208; NP_001116209; NP_001302417; NP_001302418; NP_034644
Location (UCSC)	Chr 11: 2.13 – 2.16 Mb	Chr 7: 142.2 – 142.22 Mb
PubMed search
- Wikidata
View/Edit Human	View/Edit Mouse

Insulin-like growth factor II E-peptide (somatomedians-A )

Identifiers
- Symbol: IGF2_C
- Pfam: PF08365
- InterPro: IPR013576
Available protein structures:
- PDB: IPR013576 PF08365 (ECOD; PDBsum)
- AlphaFold: IPR013576; PF08365

Insulin-like growth factor 2 (IGF-2) is a hormone that in humans is encoded by the IGF2 gene. This hormone functions as one of the primary growth hormones during fetal development, which differs from the related hormone IGF-1 which is the major growth factor in adults (whose release is stimulated by growth hormone). As its name suggests, it shares structural similarity to insulin.

== Gene structure ==
In humans, the IGF2 gene is located on chromosome 11p15.5, a region which contains numerous imprinted genes. In mice this homologous region is found at distal chromosome 7. In both organisms, IGF2 is imprinted, with expression resulting favourably from the paternally inherited allele. However, in some human brain regions a loss of imprinting occurs resulting in both IGF2 and H19 being transcribed from both parental alleles.

The protein CTCF is involved in repressing expression of the gene, by binding to the H19 imprinting control region (ICR) along with Differentially-methylated Region-1 (DMR1) and Matrix Attachment Region −3 (MAR3). These three DNA sequences bind to CTCF in a way that limits downstream enhancer access to the IGF2 region. The mechanism in which CTCF binds to these regions is currently unknown, but could include either a direct DNA-CTCF interaction or it could possibly be mediated by other proteins. In mammals (mice, humans, pigs), only the allele for insulin-like growth factor-2 (IGF2) inherited from one's father is active; that inherited from the mother is not—a phenomenon called imprinting. The mechanism: the mother's allele has an insulator between the IGF2 promoter and enhancer. So does the father's allele, but in his case, the insulator has been methylated. CTCF can no longer bind to the insulator, and so the enhancer is now free to turn on the father's IGF2 promoter.

The canonical isoform of IGF-2 preproprotein (180 amino acids) includes a signal peptide (amino acids 1-24) and a propeptide (amino acids 92-180). Proteolytic processing removes the signal peptide and the propeptide to generate the mature hormone (amino acids 25-91).

== Function ==
The major role of IGF-2 is as a growth promoting hormone during gestation.

IGF-2 exerts its effects by binding to the IGF-1 receptor and to the short isoform of the insulin receptor (IR-A or exon 11-). IGF-2 may also bind to the IGF-2 receptor (also called the cation-independent mannose 6-phosphate receptor), which acts as a signalling antagonist; that is, to prevent IGF-2 responses.

In the process of folliculogenesis, IGF-2 is created by thecal cells to act in an autocrine manner on the theca cells themselves, and in a paracrine manner on granulosa cells in the ovary. IGF-2 promotes granulosa cell proliferation during the follicular phase of the menstrual cycle, acting alongside follicle stimulating hormone (FSH). After ovulation has occurred, IGF-2 promotes progesterone secretion during the luteal phase of the menstrual cycle, together with luteinizing hormone (LH). Thus, IGF-2 acts as a co-hormone together with both FSH and LH.

A study at the Mount Sinai School of Medicine found that IGF-2 may be linked to memory and reproduction. A study at the European Neuroscience Institute-Goettingen (Germany) found that fear extinction-induced IGF-2/IGFBP7 signalling promotes the survival of 17- to 19-day-old newborn hippocampal neurons. This suggests that therapeutic strategies that enhance IGF-2 signalling and adult neurogenesis might be suitable to treat diseases linked to excessive fear memory such as PTSD.

== Preptin ==
Preptin, a 34-aa peptide hormone produced by the pancreas, kidneys, breast tissues, and salivary glands, is derived from proteolytic cleavage of IGF-2 proprotein. The sequence of preptin (amino acids 93-126 of canonical IGF-2 preproprotein) is flanked by an N-terminal arginine (Arg) cleavage site and a C-terminal putative dibasic (Arg-Arg) cleavage motif. Preptin is present in islet beta-cells, undergoes glucose-mediated co-secretion with insulin, and acts as a physiological amplifier of glucose-mediated insulin secretion. It has an anabolic impact on bone growth and exhibits osteogenic properties, increasing osteoblast mitogenic activity through phosphoactivation of MAPK1 and MAPK3. This activity resides within the first 16 amino acids of preptin. Genetic ablation of the preptin-coding region of Igf2 in female mice impairs pancreatic function.

== Clinical relevance ==
IGF-2 is sometimes produced in excess in islet cell tumors and non-islet hypoglycemic cell tumors, causing hypoglycemia. Doege-Potter syndrome is a paraneoplastic syndrome in which hypoglycemia is associated with the presence of one or more non-islet fibrous tumors in the pleural cavity. Loss of imprinting of IGF-2 is a common feature in tumors seen in Beckwith-Wiedemann syndrome. As IGF-2 promotes development of fetal pancreatic beta cells, it is believed to be related to some forms of diabetes mellitus. Preeclampsia induces a decrease in methylation level at IGF-2 demethylated region, and this might be among the mechanisms behind the association between intrauterine exposure to preeclampsia and high risk for metabolic diseases in the later life of the infants. In animals it has been shown that toxins such as PCB (polychlorinated biphenyls) affects IGF II expression.

== Interactions ==
Insulin-like growth factor 2 has been shown to interact with IGFBP3 and transferrin.

== See also ==
- Insulin-like growth factor 2 receptor
- Insulin-like growth factor II IRES
