= HAT-P-6 =

Star in the constellation Andromeda

HAT-P-6 / Sterrennacht
Observation data Epoch J2000.0 Equinox ICRS
- Constellation: Andromeda
- Right ascension: 23^{h} 39^{m} 05.8103^{s}
- Declination: +42° 27′ 57.505″
- Apparent magnitude (V): +10.47

Characteristics
- Evolutionary stage: main sequence
- Spectral type: F8V
- B−V color index: 0.41
- Variable type: planetary transit

Astrometry
Radial velocity (R_{v})	−21.67(34) km/s
Proper motion (μ)	RA: −20.202(18) mas/yr Dec.: 2.996(18) mas/yr
Parallax (π)	3.6459±0.0221 mas
Distance	895 ± 5 ly (274 ± 2 pc)
Absolute magnitude (M_{V})	+3.36(16)

Details
Mass	1.29 ± 0.06 M_{☉}
Radius	1.46 ± 0.06 R_{☉}
Luminosity	3.57+0.52 −0.43 L_{☉}
Surface gravity (log g)	4.22 ± 0.03 cgs
Temperature	6,570 ± 80 K
Metallicity [Fe/H]	–0.13 ± 0.08 dex
Rotational velocity (v sin i)	8.7 ± 1.0 km/s
Age	2.3^{+0.5}_{−0.7} Gyr

Other designations
- Sterrennacht, BD+41 4831, TOI-1373, TIC 176899385, TYC 3239-992-1, GSC 03239-00992, 2MASS J23390581+4227575, HAT-P-6

Database references
SIMBAD	data
Exoplanet Archive	data

HAT-P-6, also named Sterrennacht is a star in the constellation Andromeda, located approximately 895 light years or 274 parsecs away from the Earth. It is an F-type star, implying that it is hotter and more massive than the Sun. The apparent magnitude of the star is +10.54, which means that it can only be visible through the telescope. The absolute magnitude of +3.36 is brighter than the Sun's +4.83, meaning that the star itself is brighter than the Sun. A search for a binary companion star using adaptive optics at the MMT Observatory turned out negative.

The name Sterrennacht (Starry Night) was selected in the NameExoWorlds held by the IAU after a painting by Van Gogh.

== Planetary system ==
The companion planet HAT-P-6b is a transiting planet discovered on October 15, 2007 by the HATNet Project. The planet's true mass is slightly more than Jupiter at only 5.7%, but the radius is 33% greater, making the planet's density of 0.45 g/cm^{3}. Its large size compared to mass comes from the great amount of heat received from the nearby star that expands the planet's atmosphere, categorizing as "hot Jupiter". The orbital period is 3.852985 days and the distance from its star is 0.05235 AU. The inclination of the orbit with respect to the stellar rotation axis is roughly 166º.

The HAT-P-6 planetary system
Companion (in order from star)	Mass	Semimajor axis (AU)	Orbital period (days)	Eccentricity	Inclination (°)	Radius
b / Nachtwacht	1.106+0.039 −0.040 M_{J}	0.05239+0.00080 −0.00082	3.852985±0.000005	<0.044	166±10	1.330±0.061 R_{J}

== See also ==
- HAT-P-4
- HAT-P-5
- List of extrasolar planets
