= HAT-P-4b =

Exoplanet in the constellation Boötes

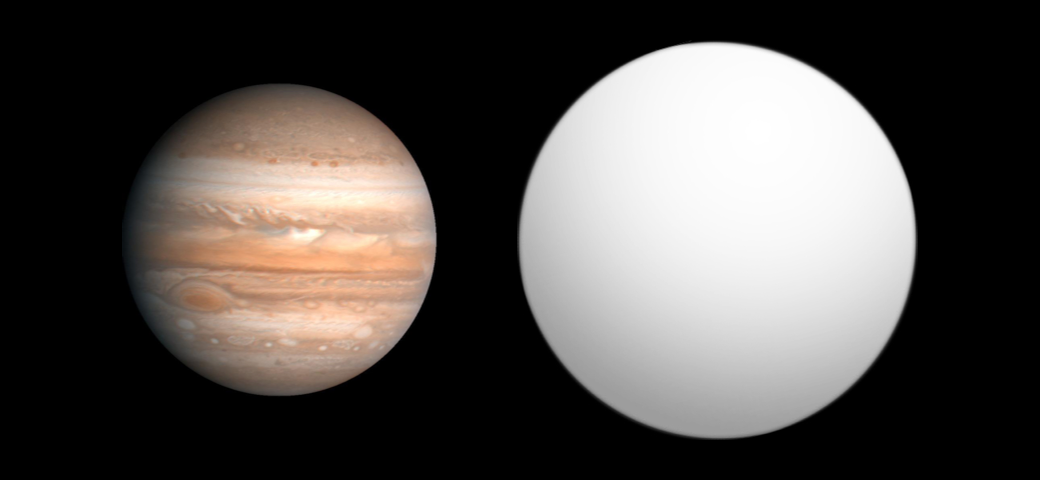
- Size comparison of HAT-P-4b with Jupiter.

Discovery
- Discovered by: Kovacs et al.
- Discovery site: Mass., USA
- Discovery date: Oct 2, 2007
- Detection method: transit

Orbital characteristics
- Semi-major axis: 0.04449+0.00083 −0.0012 AU
- Eccentricity: <0.0073
- Orbital period (sidereal): 3.0565254±0.0000012 d
- Inclination: 89.9 ^{+0.1}_{−2.2}
- Semi-amplitude: 78.6+2.4 −2.3
- Star: HAT-P-4

Physical characteristics
- Mean radius: 1.28^{+0.016}_{−0.015} R_{J}
- Mass: 0.651+0.033 −0.037 M_{J}
- Mean density: 0.410 ± 0.060 g/cm^{3}
- Surface gravity: 10.5 m/s^{2} (34 ft/s^{2})

HAT-P-4b is a confirmed extrasolar planet orbiting the star HAT-P-4 over 1000 light years away in the constellation Boötes. It was discovered by transit on October 2, 2007, which looks for slight dimming of stars caused by planets that passed in front of them. It is the fourth planet discovered by the HATNet Project. It is also called BD+36 2593b, TYC 2569-01599-1b, 2MASS J15195792+3613467b, SAO 64638b.

It is a hot Jupiter with 68% the mass and 127% the radius of Jupiter, and 41% the density of water (31% of Jupiter). Since the inclination is known by transit observation, the true mass is known. The secondary eclipse where the planet passes behind the star was detected by the Spitzer Space Telescope leading to the discovery that the planet has inefficient heat transfer from its day to night side.

The study in 2012, utilizing a Rossiter–McLaughlin effect, have determined the planetary orbit is probably aligned with the rotational axis of the star, misalignment equal to -4.9±11.9°.
