= HAT-P-6b =

Extrasolar planet in the Andromeda constellation

HAT-P-6b / Nachtwacht
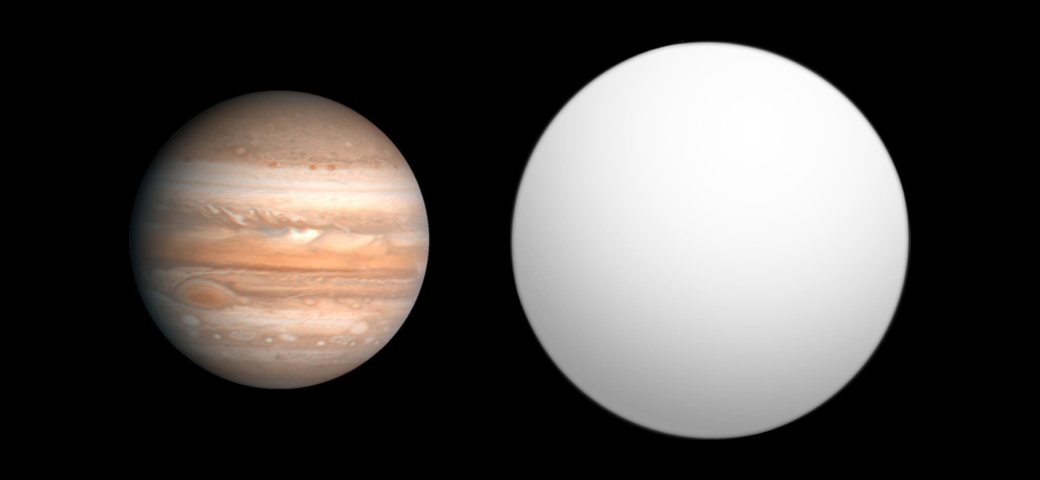
- Size comparison of HAT-P-6b with Jupiter.

Discovery
- Discovered by: Noyes et al.
- Discovery date: October 15, 2007
- Detection method: transit

Orbital characteristics
- Semi-major axis: 0.05239+0.00080 −0.00082 AU
- Eccentricity: <0.044
- Orbital period (sidereal): 3.852985±0.000005 d
- Inclination: 166±10 °
- Star: HAT-P-6

Physical characteristics
- Mean radius: 1.33 ± 0.06 R_{J}
- Mass: 1.106+0.039 −0.040 M_{J}
- Mean density: 0.583 g/cm^{3}

HAT-P-6b is a transiting extrasolar planet discovered by Noyes et al. on October 15, 2007. It is located approximately 910 light-years away in the constellation of Andromeda, orbiting the star HAT-P-6. This hot Jupiter planet orbits with a semi-major axis of about 0.05 AU, and takes 92 hours, 28 minutes, 17 seconds to orbit the star. It has true mass of 5.7% greater than Jupiter and a radius 33% greater than Jupiter, corresponding to a density of 0.583 g/cm_{3}, which is less than water.

The planet HAT-P-6b is named Nachtwacht. The name was selected in the NameExoWorlds campaign by the Netherlands, during the 100th anniversary of the IAU, after Rembrandt's painting The Night Watch.

The sky projected angle between stellar and orbital axis is roughly 166°, making it one of the few planets that is in a retrograde orbit around its parent star. Observations made by Spitzer Space Telescope shows that the planet atmosphere has a weak temperature inversion, or no inversion at all, depending on how strong is the stellar chromospheric activity.

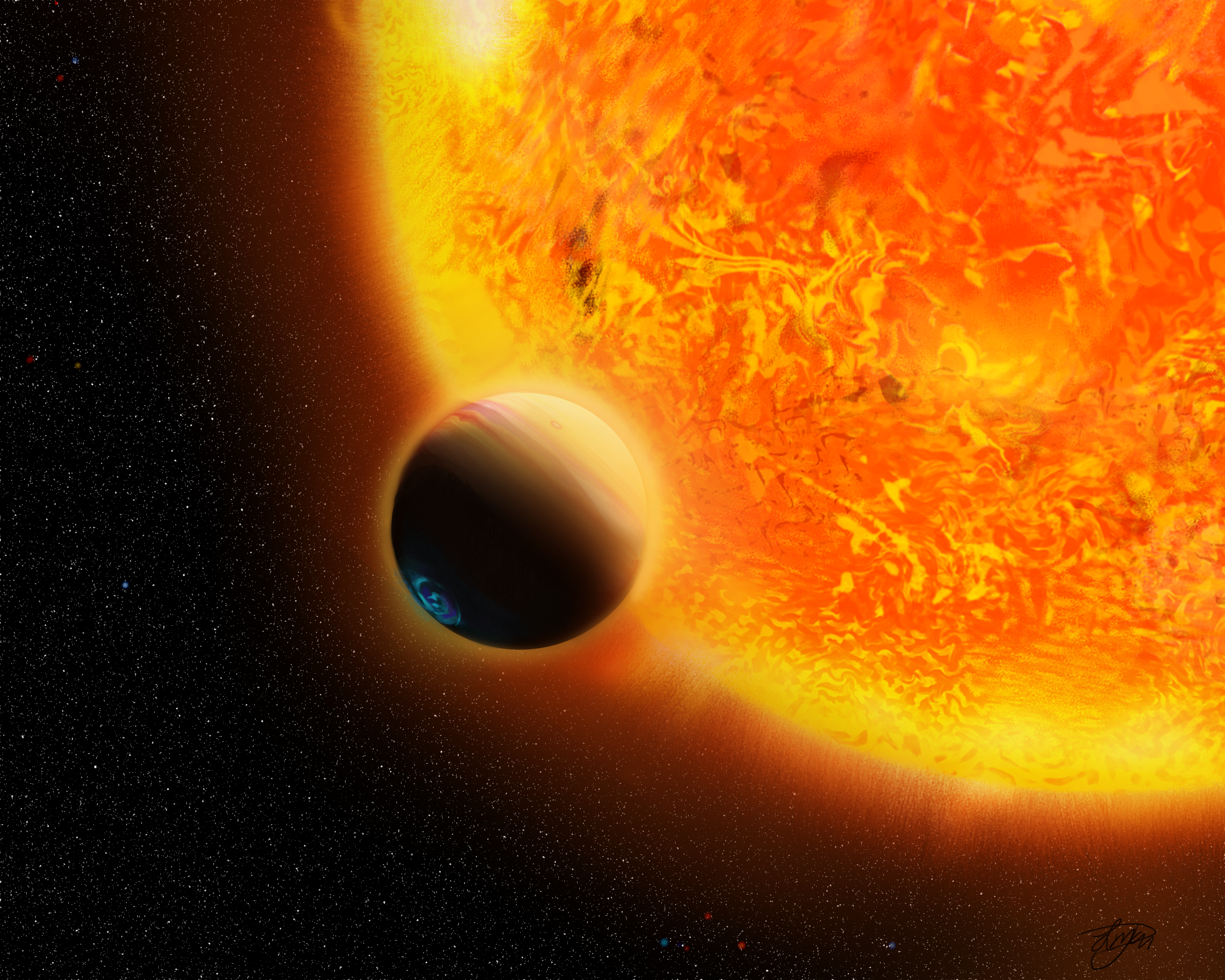
Artist's impression of HAT-P-6b orbiting its host star with an aurora on its south pole.
