= PPPPPP (manga) =

Japanese manga series by Mapollo 3

- First tankōbon volume cover, featuring Lucky Otogami
- Genre: Musical
- Manga
- Written by: Mapollo 3
- Published by: Shueisha
- English publisher: NA: Viz Media
- Imprint: Jump Comics
- Magazine: Weekly Shōnen Jump
- Original run: September 18, 2021 – February 27, 2023
- Volumes: 8
- icon

PPPPPP is a Japanese musical manga series written and illustrated by Mapollo 3. It was serialized in Shueisha's shōnen manga magazine Weekly Shōnen Jump from September 2021 to February 2023, with its chapters collected into eight tankōbon volumes. The manga has been licensed for English release in North America by Viz Media.

== Synopsis ==
Lucky Otogami is one of seven children who all love the piano. However, after a divorce, Lucky was left with only his mother while his father took his siblings. They became the prodigies known as the "Otogami Sextuplet Pianists", while Lucky was forced to live an abusive life in a relative's home after his mother fell into a coma. When his mother wakes up, he believes everything is right with the world, until he discovers she only has one year to live. Lucky decides to become a professional pianist so his mother can see him perform with his siblings.

== Publication ==
Written and illustrated by Mapollo 3, PPPPPP was serialized in Shueisha's shōnen manga magazine Weekly Shōnen Jump from September 18, 2021, to February 27, 2023. Shueisha has collected its chapters into individual tankōbon volumes. The first volume was released on January 4, 2022. As of May 2, 2023, eight volumes have been released.

PPPPPP has been licensed for simultaneous publication in North America as it is released in Japan, with its chapters being digitally launched by Viz Media on its Shonen Jump website. Shueisha also simulpublishes the series in English for free on the Manga Plus app and website.

=== Volumes ===
No.	Original release date	Original ISBN	English release date	English ISBN
1	January 4, 2022	978-4-08-883006-3	January 24, 2023	978-1-9747-3412-2
1. "Mediocre Lucky" (ボンサイラッキー, Bonsai Rakkī); 2. "Life Expectancy" (ライフエクスペクタンシー, Raifu Ekusupekutanshī); 3. "Dadamon Battle" (ダダモンバトル, Dadamon Batoru); 4. "Re" (レ); 5. "Titan" (タイタン, Taitan); 6. "Joy" (歓喜, Kanki); 7. "Ovation" (喝采, Kassai)
2	April 4, 2022	978-4-08-883116-9	April 25, 2023	978-1-9747-3849-6
8. "La for Everything" (すべてはラに, Subete wa Ra ni); 9. "···−−−···"; 10. "Shooting" (シューティング, Shūtingu); 11. "Star" (スター, Sutā); 12. "−1P" (−1P, Mainasu 1 Pī); 13. "Reijiro" (レイジロウ, Reijirō); 14. "Let's Go to Japan" (レッツゴ~ジャポ~ン, Rettsu Gō Japōn); 15. "Thank You for Being Born" (サンキューフォービーイングボーン, Sankyū fō Bīingu Bōn); 16. "Mi" (ミ)
3	July 4, 2022	978-4-08-883158-9	July 25, 2023	978-1-9747-4005-5
17. "Analyzing Elise" (エリーゼアナリーゼ, Erīze Anarīze); 18. "Mimo" (ミモ); 19. "The Dreaded Beginning" (恐ろしき開幕, Osoroshiki Kaimaku); 20. "The Undying Queen of the Distorted Forest" (歪みの森の不死身女王, Yugami no Mori no Fujimi Joō); 21. "It's Sad" (悲しいね, Kanashii ne); 22. "The Otogami Family" (音上家, Otogami-ke); 23. "Hope in the Night Sky" (夜空に希望, Yozora no Kibō); 24. "That Child" (あの子供, Ano Kodomo); 25. "My Fairy Lady" (マイフェアリーレーディー, Mai Fearī Rēdī)
4	September 2, 2022	978-4-08-883225-8	October 24, 2023	978-1-9747-4211-0
26. "Unremarkable Day at the Beach" (なんてことはないあの海の日の, Nante koto wanai ano Uminohi no); 27. "By your fairy" (バイユアフェアリー, Bai yua fearī); 28. "One Mistake" (ミステイクが1つ, Misuteiku ga Hitotsu); 29. "Mimin Analysis" (ミーミンアナリーゼ, Mīmin Anarīze); 30. "Happiness for a Weeping Princess" (泣く王女のための喜びの, Naku Ōjo no tame no Yorokobi no); 31. "−2P" (−2P, Mainasu 2 Pī); 32. "Mimin" (ミーミン, Mīmin); 33. "The Otogami Brand" (音上ぶらんど, Otogami Burando); 34. "Four-On-Four" (4on4)
5	November 4, 2022	978-4-08-883356-9	January 23, 2024	978-1-9747-4449-7
35. "Fa" (ファ); 36. "Dance in the Sky" (空は舞える, Sora wa Maeru); 37. "December 21" (12月21日, Jūni-gatsu Nijūichi-nichi); 38. "Happy Birthday" (ハッピーバースデー, Happī Bāsudē); 39. "Goodbye, Thank You" (さようならありがとう, Sayōnara Arigatō); 40. "Entry" (入場, Nyūjō); 41. "Confession and Hope" (ザンゲANDホープ, Zange ando Hōpu); 42. "Confession and a Beatdown" (ザンゲANDボッユボユ, Zange ando Boyyuboyu); 43. "On To Round Two" (トゥーラウンドツー, Tū Raundo Tsū)
6	January 4, 2023	978-4-08-883421-4	April 23, 2024	978-1-9747-4543-2
44. "Let's Gooo, New World" (レッツゴ~ニュ~ワ~ルド, Rettsu Gō Nyū Wārudo); 45. "Choose" (選んで, Erande); 46. "The Genius Princess and the Fairy Queen" (ジーニアスプリンセスとフェアリークイーン, Jīniasu Purinsesu to Fearī Kuīn); 47. "Transitional Period" (過渡期, Katoki); 48. "So" (ソ); 49. "Brilliant Lucky" (テンサイラッキー, Tensai Rakkī); 50. "Simple State" (簡単化, Kantanka); 51. "Da Da Da Duuum" (ダダダダーン, Dadadadān); 52. "Much Heavier" (重く重く, Omoku Omoku)
7	April 4, 2023	978-4-08-883450-4	July 23, 2024	978-1-9747-4831-0
53. "Is It Fun to Steal?" (パクるのってたのしい？, Pakuru notte Tanoshii?); 54. "I Understand" (理解した, Rikaishita); 55. "Beginning of the End" (終わり開幕, Owari Kaimaku); 56. "Nonetheless" (それでも、, Sore de mo,); 57. "The Precious Theme Park That Rains Jewels" (大切な、宝石降る遊園地, Taisetsu na, Hōseki Furu Yūenchi); 58. "Fanta" (ファンタ); 59. "Remembering a Little Bit in the Last Moments" (最期に少し思い出す, Saigo ni Sukoshi Omoidasu); 60. "Furusu's Core" (フルスコア, Furusu Koa); 61. "The Tempest" (テンペスト, Tenpesuto)
8	May 2, 2023	978-4-08-883549-5	October 22, 2024	978-1-9747-5070-2
62. "Beginning To Think By Stopping Thinking" (思考停止による思考開始, Shikō Teishi ni Yoru Shikō Kaishi); 63. "When I Thought I'd Dance in the Sky" (空は舞えると思えたのは, Sora wa Maeru to Omoeta no wa); 64. "I Don't Know Why, But I Remember A Little Bit" (なんでかちよつと思い出す, Nande Kachiyo Tsuto Omoidasu); 65. "Mimi-Melo at Peace" (ピースなミミメロ, Pīsu na Mimimero); 66. "Train Station and Italy" (駅とイタリア, Eki to Itaria); 67. "Hm-Hm-Hmm♪Hmm" (フンフンフン♪フン, Funfunfun♪fun); 68. "DA" (ダ, Da); 69. "DA" (ダ, Da); 70. "Lucky" (ラッキー, Rakkī)

== Reception ==
Reviewing the first chapter of PPPPPP, Steven Blackburn of Screen Rant wrote that the conflicts seen in the manga are characteristic of successful shōnen series like Yūki Tabata's Black Clover and Masashi Kishimoto's Naruto, while commenting that there are other factors that "further hint at PPPPPP's likelihood of success", such as the incorporation of supernatural elements; Blackburn also stated, "In true shōnen-like fashion, this new [Weekly] Shōnen Jump manga doesn't rely on the reader's imagination to capture the power of music. Maporo 3-Gō makes it so that a moving melody can cause people to have visions."

The series was nominated for the 2022 Next Manga Award in the print manga category and placed fifth out of 50 nominees. It ranked tenth in the Nationwide Bookstore Employees' Recommended Comics of 2023.
