= GGA1 =

Protein-coding gene in the species Homo sapiens

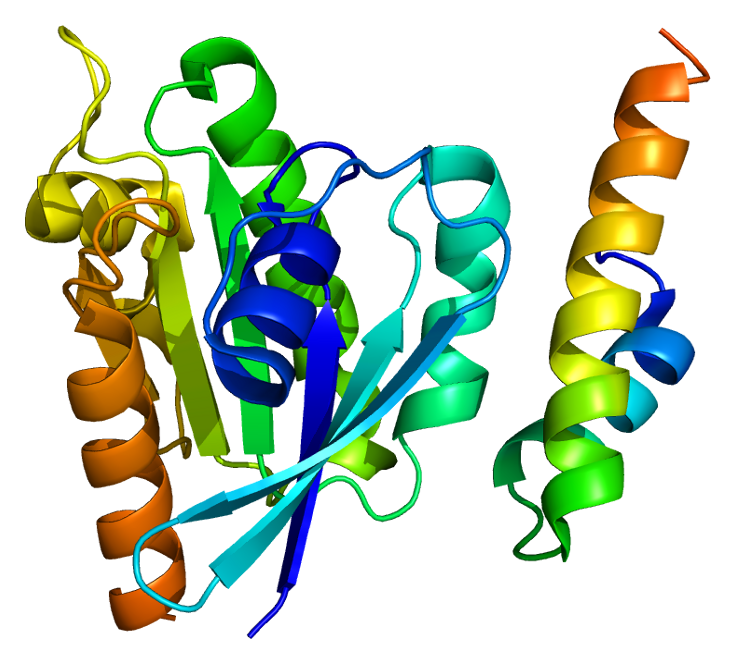
Available structures
PDB	Ortholog search: PDBe RCSB
PDB	List of PDB id codes 1J2J, 1JWF, 1JWG, 1NA8, 1NAF, 1NWM, 1O3X, 1OM9, 1OXZ, 1PY1, 1UJJ, 1UJK, 1X79, 2DWX, 2DWY, 3G2S, 3G2T, 3G2U, 3G2V, 3G2W

Identifiers
- Aliases: GGA1, golgi associated, gamma adaptin ear containing, ARF binding protein 1
- External IDs: OMIM: 606004; MGI: 2146207; HomoloGene: 39250; GeneCards: GGA1; OMA:GGA1 - orthologs

Gene location (Human)
Chr.	Chromosome 22 (human)
Band	22q13.1	Start	37,608,725 bp
Band	22q13.1	End	37,633,564 bp

Gene location (Mouse)
Chr.	Chromosome 15 (mouse)
Band	15|15 E1	Start	78,761,390 bp
Band	15|15 E1	End	78,778,785 bp
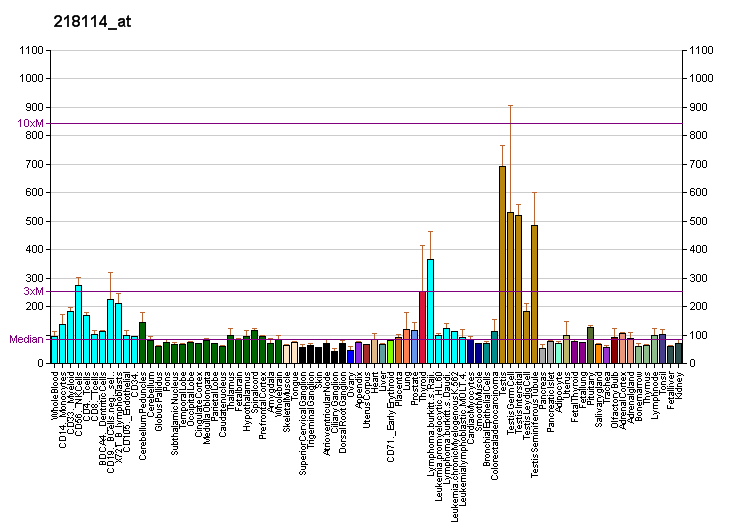

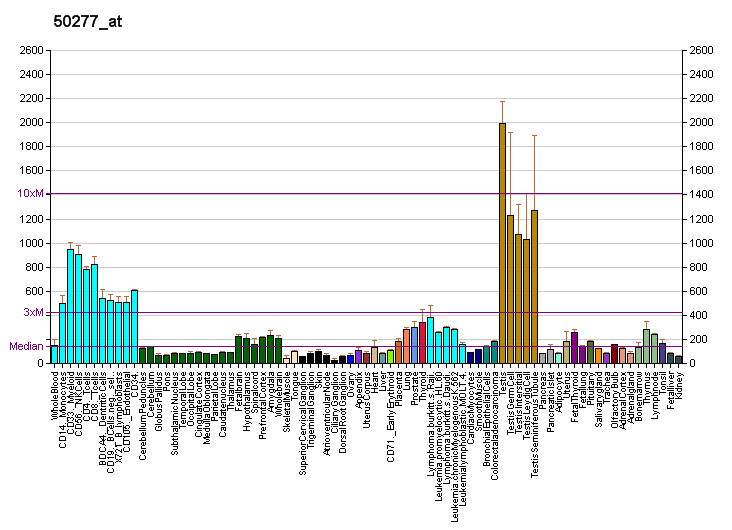

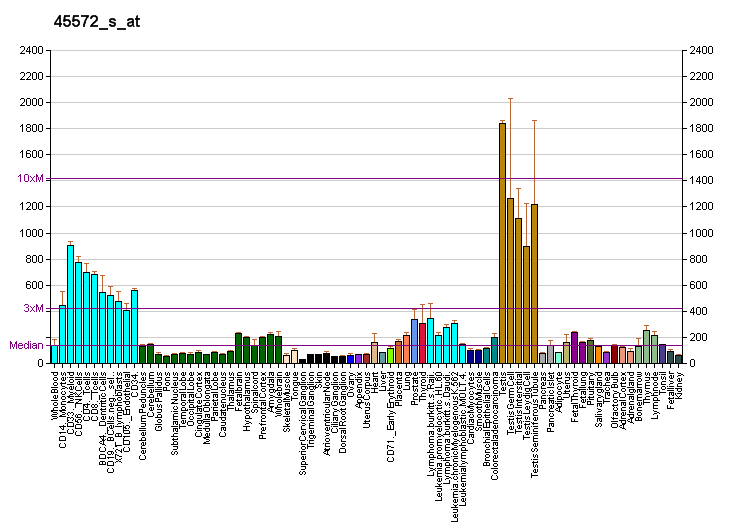
RNA expression pattern
Bgee	Human / Mouse (ortholog); Top expressed in: pancreatic ductal cell; left testis; right testis; endothelial cell; right uterine tube; mucosa of ileum; right hemisphere of cerebellum; pituitary gland; gingival epithelium; anterior pituitary / Top expressed in: granulocyte; muscle of thigh; lip; pyloric antrum; yolk sac; superior frontal gyrus; ventricular zone; dentate gyrus of hippocampal formation granule cell; primary visual cortex; esophagus; More reference expression data
BioGPS	More reference expression data
Gene ontology
Molecular function	protein binding; protein heterodimerization activity; molecular function
Cellular component	endosome; Golgi apparatus; endosome membrane; intracellular anatomical structure; membrane; intracellular membrane-bounded organelle; clathrin adaptor complex; nucleoplasm; early endosome membrane; early endosome; cytosol; protein-containing complex
Biological process	protein transport; intracellular protein transport; toxin transport; positive regulation of protein catabolic process; vesicle-mediated transport; transport; Golgi to plasma membrane transport; protein localization; protein localization to cell surface; retrograde transport, endosome to Golgi; Golgi to plasma membrane protein transport; protein localization to ciliary membrane
Sources:Amigo / QuickGO
Orthologs
Species	Human	Mouse
Entrez	26088	106039
Ensembl	ENSG00000100083	ENSMUSG00000033128
UniProt	Q9UJY5	Q8R0H9
RefSeq (mRNA)	NM_001001560; NM_001001561; NM_001172687; NM_001172688; NM_013365 NM_001363771	NM_145929
RefSeq (protein)	NP_001001560; NP_001166158; NP_001166159; NP_037497; NP_001350700	NP_666041
Location (UCSC)	Chr 22: 37.61 – 37.63 Mb	Chr 15: 78.76 – 78.78 Mb
PubMed search
- Wikidata
View/Edit Human	View/Edit Mouse

ADP-ribosylation factor-binding protein GGA1 is a protein that in humans is encoded by the GGA1 gene.

This gene encodes a member of the Golgi-localized, gamma adaptin ear-containing, ARF-binding (GGA) protein family. Members of this family are ubiquitous coat proteins that regulate the trafficking of proteins between the trans-Golgi network and the lysosome. These proteins share an amino-terminal VHS domain which mediates sorting of the mannose 6-phosphate receptors at the trans-Golgi network. They also contain a carboxy-terminal region with homology to the ear domain of gamma-adaptins. Multiple alternatively spliced transcript variants encoding different isoforms have been found for this gene.

== Interactions ==
GGA1 has been shown to interact with Sortilin 1, BACE2, RABEP1 and ARF3.
