= N-acetylglucosamine-1-phosphate transferase =

Mammalian protein found in Homo sapiens

N-acetylglucosamine-1-phosphate transferase, alpha and beta subunits

Identifiers
- Symbol: GNPTAB
- Alt. symbols: GNPTA
- NCBI gene: 79158
- HGNC: 29670
- OMIM: 607840
- RefSeq: NM_024312
- UniProt: Q3T906

Other data
- Locus: Chr. 12 q23.3
Search for
- Structures: Swiss-model
- Domains: InterPro

N-acetylglucosamine-1-phosphate transferase, gamma subunit

Identifiers
- Symbol: GNPTG
- Alt. symbols: GNPTAG
- NCBI gene: 84572
- HGNC: 23026
- OMIM: 607838
- RefSeq: NM_032520
- UniProt: Q9UJJ9

Other data
- Locus: Chr. 16 p13.3
Search for
- Structures: Swiss-model
- Domains: InterPro

N-acetylglucosamine-1-phosphate transferase (GlcNAc-1-phosphotransferase) is a transferase enzyme.

== Function ==
It is made up of two alpha (α), two betas (β), and two gammas (γ) subunits. GNPTAB produces the alpha and beta subunits, GNPTG produces the gamma subunit. GlcNAc-1-phosphotransferase functions to prepare newly made enzymes for lysosome transportation (lysosomal hydrolases to the lysosome). Lysosomes, a part of an animal cell, helps break down large molecules into smaller ones that can be reused. GlcNAc-1-phosphotransferase phosphorylates carbon 6 of one or more mannosyl residues of N-linked glycoproteins being processed in the Golgi apparatus. UDP-GLcNAc provides the phosphate in a reaction catalysed by this enzyme. M6P acts as an indicator of whether a hydrolase should be transported to the lysosome or not. Once a hydrolase indicates an M6P, it can be transported to a lysosome. Surprisingly some lysosomal enzymes are only tagged at a rate of 5% or lower.

== Clinical significance ==
It is associated with the following conditions:

- mucolipidosis II alpha/beta (I-cell disease) - GNPTAB
- mucolipidosis III alpha/beta (pseudo-Hurler polydystrophy) - GNPTAB
- mucolipidosis III gamma - GNPTG
- stuttering (Kang et al., 2010)

In melanocytic cells, GNPTG gene expression may be regulated by MITF.
