= HAT-P-4 =

Wide binary star system in the constellation Boötes

Observation data Epoch J2000 Equinox ICRS
- Constellation: Boötes
- HAT-P-4A
- Right ascension: 15^{h} 19^{m} 57.9204^{s}
- Declination: +36° 13′ 46.738″
- Apparent magnitude (V): 11.159±0.010
- HAT-P-4B
- Right ascension: 15^{h} 20^{m} 00.0127^{s}
- Declination: +36° 12′ 18.520″
- Apparent magnitude (V): 11.534±0.01

Characteristics

HAT-P-4A
- Spectral type: G0V
- B−V color index: 0.771
- Variable type: planetary transit

HAT-P-4B
- Spectral type: G2V

Astrometry

HAT-P-4A
Radial velocity (R_{v})	−1.13(37) km/s
Proper motion (μ)	RA: −21.513(13) mas/yr Dec.: −24.255(19) mas/yr
Parallax (π)	3.1071±0.0154 mas
Distance	1,050 ± 5 ly (322 ± 2 pc)

HAT-P-4B
Radial velocity (R_{v})	−1.31(35) km/s
Proper motion (μ)	RA: −21.424(13) mas/yr Dec.: −24.182(20) mas/yr
Parallax (π)	3.0777±0.0155 mas
Distance	1,060 ± 5 ly (325 ± 2 pc)

Position (relative to HAT-P-4A)
Component	HAT-P-4B
Epoch of observation	1999/02/07
Angular distance	91.760±0.099″
Position angle	163.97±0.06°
Projected separation	28446 AU

Details

HAT-P-4A
Mass	1.260^{+0.043}_{−0.042} M_{☉}
Radius	1.573±0.015 R_{☉}
Luminosity	2.8 L_{☉}
Surface gravity (log g)	4.145±0.015 cgs
Temperature	5927^{+57}_{−47} K
Metallicity [Fe/H]	0.277±0.007 dex
Rotational velocity (v sin i)	5.6 ± 0.9 km/s
Age	~4.2 Gyr

HAT-P-4B
Mass	1.0 M_{☉}
Radius	1.3 R_{☉}
Luminosity	2.0 L_{☉}
Surface gravity (log g)	4.38±0.14 cgs
Temperature	6037±37 K
Metallicity [Fe/H]	0.175±0.006 dex
Age	7.8 Gyr

Other designations
- HAT-P-4A: BD+36°2593, SAO 64638, TYC 2569-1599-1, GSC 02569-01599, 2MASS J15195792+3613467
- HAT-P-4B: TYC 2569-744-1, 2MASS J15200001+3612185

Database references
SIMBAD	A
- B

Data sources:

Hipparcos Catalogue, CCDM (2002), Bright Star Catalogue (5th rev. ed.)

HAT-P-4 is a wide binary star consisting of a pair of G-type main-sequence stars in the constellation of Boötes. It also has the BD designation BD+36°2593.

The star exhibits an infrared excess of unknown origin.

== Binary companion ==
The companion star is located at a distance of 28446 astronomical units and therefore has an orbital period that is extremely long.

== Planetary system ==
The primary star is home to the transiting extrasolar planet HAT-P-4b. This planet is a fairly typical hot Jupiter type planet in a 3-day orbit.

The HAT-P-4A planetary system
Companion (in order from star)	Mass	Semimajor axis (AU)	Orbital period (days)	Eccentricity	Inclination (°)	Radius
b	0.651+0.033 −0.037 M_{J}	0.04449+0.00083 −0.0012	3.0565254±0.0000012	<0.0073	—	1.28^{+0.016}_{−0.015} R_{J}

== See also ==
- HATNet Project
