= Mannose 6-phosphate =

Names
- IUPAC name 6-O-Phosphono-D-mannopyranose

Identifiers
CAS Number	3672-15-9
3D model (JSmol)	Interactive image; Interactive image
ChEBI	CHEBI:48066
ChemSpider	58636 Unspecified anomers; 394282 alpha anomer; 388338 beta anomer
MeSH	mannose-6-phosphate
PubChem CID	65127
UNII	U2S53JF879
CompTox Dashboard (EPA)	DTXSID80957947
- InChI: InChI=1S/C6H13O9P/c7-3-2(1-14-16(11,12)13)15-6(10)5(9)4(3)8/h2-10H,1H2,(H2,11,12,13)/t2-,3-,4+,5+,6?/m1/s1 Key: NBSCHQHZLSJFNQ-QTVWNMPRSA-N
- SMILES: C(C1C(C(C(C(O1)O)O)O)O)OP(=O)(O)O; O=P(O)(O)OC[C@H]1OC(O)[C@@H](O)[C@@H](O)[C@@H]1O

Properties
Chemical formula	C_{6}H_{13}O_{9}P
Molar mass	260.136 g/mol
- Except where otherwise noted, data are given for materials in their standard state (at 25 °C [77 °F], 100 kPa). verify (what is ?) Infobox references

Mannose-6-phosphate (M6P) is a molecule bound by lectin in the immune system. M6P is converted to fructose 6-phosphate by mannose phosphate isomerase.

M6P is a key targeting signal for acid hydrolase precursor proteins that are destined for transport to lysosomes. The M6P tag is added to such proteins in the cis-Golgi apparatus. Specifically, in a reaction involving uridine diphosphate (UDP) and N-acetylglucosamine, the enzyme N-acetylglucosamine-1-phosphate transferase catalyzes the N-linked glycosylation of asparagine residues with M6P. Once appropriately marked with the M6P targeting signal, these proteins are moved to the trans-Golgi network. There, the M6P moiety is recognized and bound by mannose 6-phosphate receptor (MPR) proteins at pH 6.5–6.7.

The M6P-tagged lysosomal enzymes are shipped to the late endosomes via vesicular transport. Enzyme replacement therapy (ERT) for several lysosomal storage diseases relies on this pathway to efficiently direct synthetic enzymes to the lysosome where each can metabolize its particular substrate. The pH in the late endosome can reach 6.0, which causes dissociation of M6P from its receptor. Upon release, the enzymes are ferried to their final destination in the lysosomes. The MPRs are packed into vesicles that bud off the late endosome and return to the trans-Golgi network. In this way, the MPRs can be recycled.

== See also ==
- I-cell disease
- Insulin-like growth factor 2 receptor
- Mannose
- Mannose 1-phosphate
