= Acid hydrolase =

Enzyme

An acid hydrolase is an enzyme that works best at acidic pHs. It is commonly located in lysosomes, which are acidic on the inside. Acid hydrolases may be nucleases, proteases, glycosidases, lipases, phosphatases, sulfatases and phospholipases and make up the approximately 50 degradative enzymes of the lysosome that break apart biological matter.

== Types ==
- Nucleases (P1 from Penicillium citrinum, used in the food industry for taste enhancement or present in Gouda cheese)
- Lipase – e.g. lysosomal acid lipase
- Proteases
- Glycosidases

== See also ==
- Antimicrobial peptides
- Cathelicidin
- Hydrolase
