= Alzheimer's disease among East Asians =

Alzheimer's disease (AD) is a complex neurodegenerative disease that affects millions of people across the globe. It is also a topic of interest in the East Asian population, especially as the burden of disease increases due to aging and population growth. The pathogenesis of AD between ethnic groups is different. However, prior studies in AD pathology have focused primarily on populations of European ancestry and may not give adequate insight on the genetic, clinical, and biological differences found in East Asians with AD. Gaps in knowledge regarding Alzheimer's disease in the East Asian population introduce serious barriers to screening, early prevention, diagnosis, treatment, and timely intervention.

== Prevalence ==
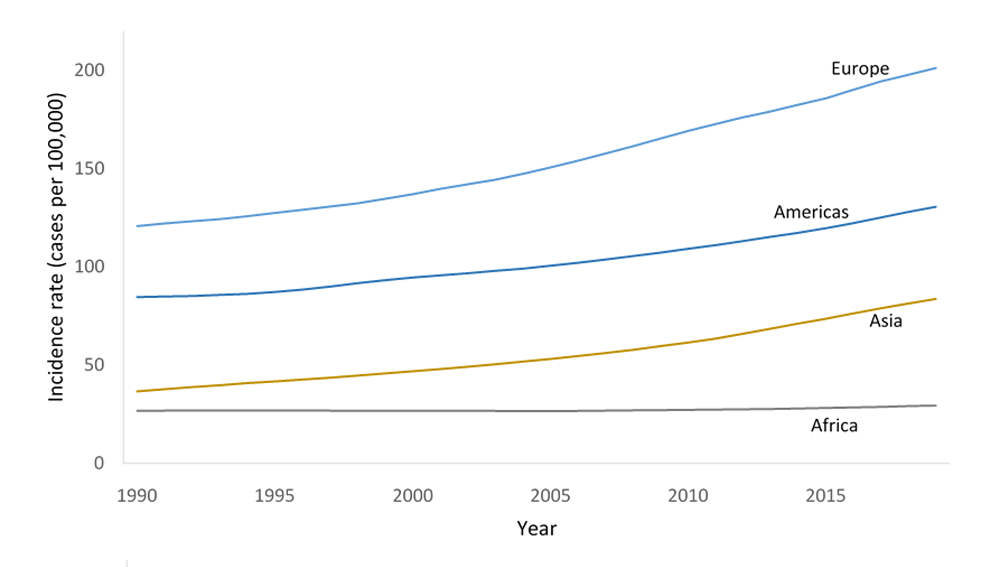
Increasing burden of dementia over time due to aging populations.

The prevalence of Alzheimer's disease and other dementias is significant in East Asian countries compared to the global average, which has 667 cases per 100,000 people. Japan has the highest prevalence of AD in the world at 3,079 cases per 100,000 population. South Korea and China have 1119 and 924 cases per 100,000 people, respectively. China has the highest number of people with dementia in the world at 13.1 million cases. Women were found to have higher rates of AD, potentially due to higher estrogen levels. According to a study, early menopause could be a contributing factor to an increased risk of AD. The prevalence is higher in older individuals and in rural areas.

In North America, the rates of Alzheimer's disease in Asian Americans were found to be similar to Non-Hispanic whites and lower compared to Black Americans and Hispanic Americans. Japanese Americans were found to have increased AD prevalence compared to other Asian American subgroups. In terms of trends, Japan has experienced a rapid increase in prevalence rates relative to the global average, from 772 cases per 100,000 in 1990 to 3029 cases per 100,000 in 2019. Japan is also expected to have the highest dementia-related death rates by 2040.

== Risk factors and co-morbidities ==
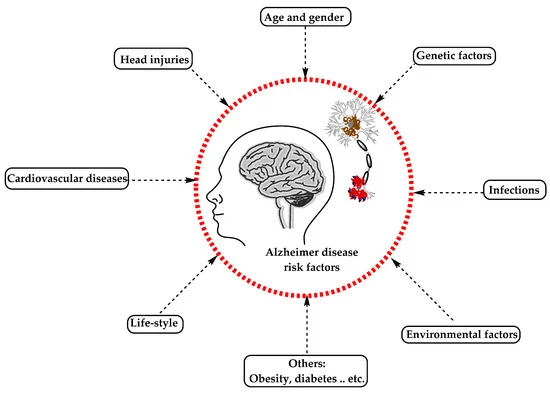
The risk factors for Alzheimer's disease.

Age and genetics have consistently been the strongest predictors of dementia and AD. However, lifestyle factors and other co-morbidities can play a significant role in contributing to AD susceptibility.

=== Demographic risk factors ===
Older age is a significant risk factor for dementia, with the rate of cognitive decline being tenfold greater in the last three years of life. Income, occupation, and education are associated with the risk of developing AD in East Asian populations. Higher education generally indicates lower risk of AD. More physical or unsafe workplace conditions are associated with increased risk of AD.

=== Behavioral and physiological risk factors ===
Smoking, low social activity, and low physical activity are risk factors for AD in East Asian populations. Vascular conditions such as high blood pressure are also linked to dementia later in life. A sedentary lifestyle or obesity are believed to contribute to dementia susceptibility. Specifically, lower body mass index (BMI) may contribute to a lower likelihood of dementia. A healthy diet high in fish, fruit, Vegetables, and legumes but lower in meat and dairy is associated with decreased risk of AD. Regular consumption of vegetable and fruit juices may decrease AD risk due to the intake of popyphenols. Abnormal levels of insulin and impaired glucose tolerance is connected to increased dementia susceptibility in East Asians. Poor early life environmental factors contribute to longer duration or more rapidly progressing AD later in life. Moreover, heavy metal exposures, such as lead, cadmium, mercury and arsenic, have been found to induce neurotoxicity, leading to an increased risk of AD. Daytime sleepiness and sleep apnea may have a relationship with later cognitive decline and dementia. A study of Japanese Americans found that mid-life proteinuria and impaired renal function may be an independent predictor of late-life dementia.

=== Comorbidities ===
Diabetes, hypertension, cardiovascular diseases, stroke, and cancer are comorbidities in East Asian people with AD. In a review of AD patients in Taiwan, the co-prevalence of hypertension, diabetes, and stroke was reported to range from 30.2% to 60.7%, 15.1% to 24.2%, and 10.8 to 13.7% respectively. A study of Korean AD patients identified elevated prevalence of hypertension (71.6% AD vs 55% control) and diabetes (44.9% AD vs 30.1% control) in AD patients compared to control patients. Depressive symptoms and diabetes were also more increased in cognitively impaired Chinese Americans compared to White Americans.

== Genetics ==
Alzheimer's disease is influenced by a multitude of contributing genetic factors. The heritability of AD is estimated to range from 58 to 79%, making the elucidation of the genetic determinants of disease a crucial component to understanding the pathology of AD in East Asians.

=== Genetic studies ===
Genetic studies such as genome-wide association studies (GWAS) are used to scan the genomes of many individuals to identify genetic variations that may be associated with a certain disease or trait. GWAS in Alzheimer's disease patients have been able to identify a number of risk variants and genetic factors that are linked to disease. Prior genetic studies have been focused primarily on populations with European ancestry, which prevents a comprehensive understanding of AD in other ethnic groups. It is important for GWAS to be conducted across diverse populations because the genetic differences between ethnic groups may influence the underlying biology of AD and identify unique genetic determinants. Only seven GWAS have been conducted using East Asian populations to identify race-specific genetic factors and susceptibility loci associated with AD. These GWAS focused on using cohorts from China, South Korea, and Japan. Compared to GWAS in Caucasians, GWAS in East Asians are also much smaller and have revealed 26 AD-associated loci in total. In comparison, a single recent GWAS in European populations involved over a million individuals and have identified 38 susceptibility loci.

=== ApoE ===
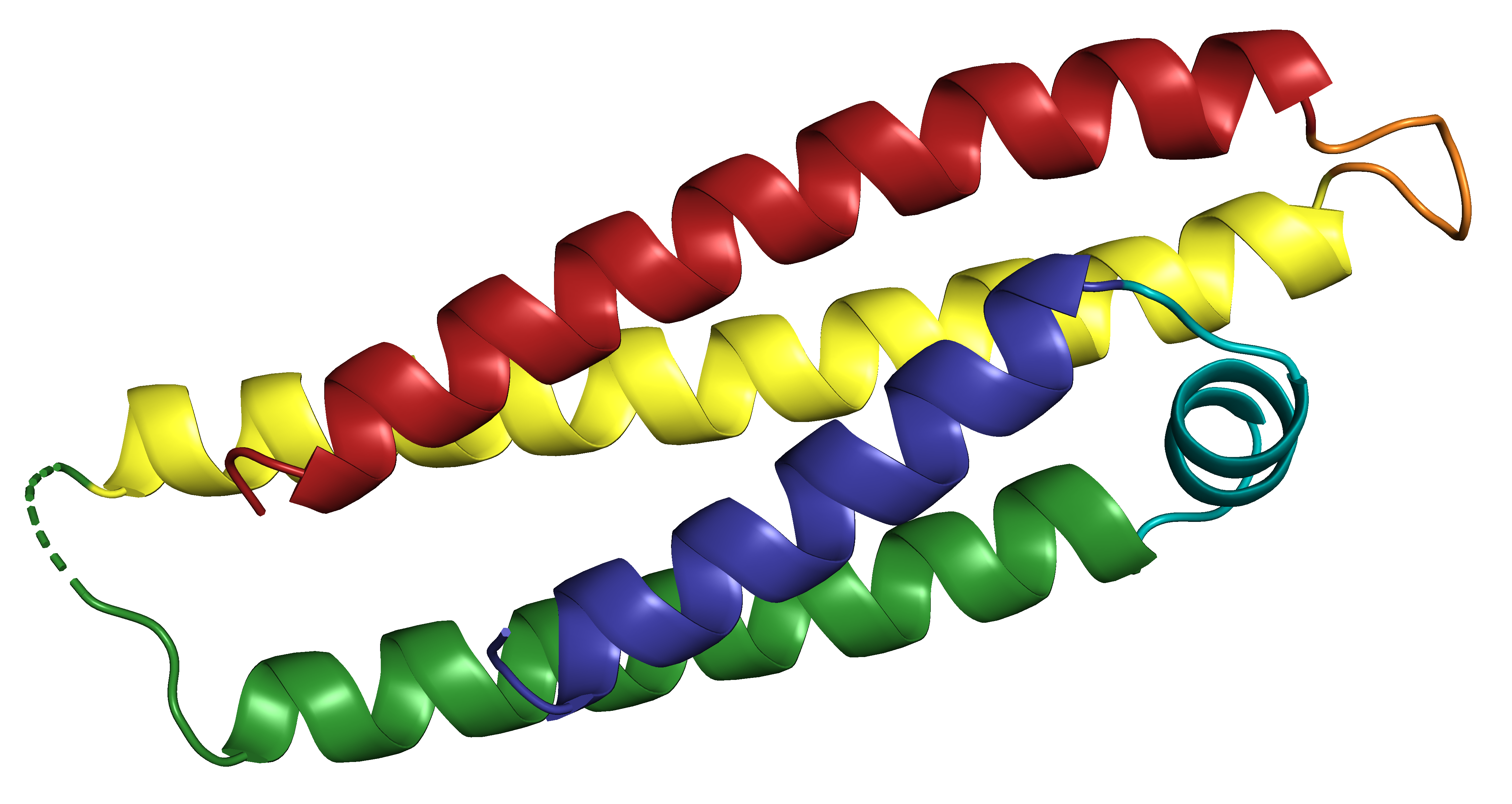
A structural model of the 22k fragment of apolipoprotein E4

The genotype of apolipoprotein E (ApoE) is the strongest genetic risk factor for sporadic AD. ApoE is a multifunctional protein that is involved in lipid transport and exists in several different forms or alleles.

Genetic risk of ApoE genotypes: .
Odds Ratio (OR) of 1 is normal risk. Higher OR indicates higher risk.
Population	Two copies of ε2 allele	No copies of ε4 allele	One copy of ε4 allele	Two copies of ε4 allele	Reference
Caucasian	0.9	1	2.7	12.5	
Japanese	1.1	1	5.6	33.1	
African American	2.4	1	1.1	5.5	
Hispanic	2.6	1	2.2	2.2	

The most common APOE alleles are the ε2, ε3, and ε4 alleles, which were discovered to each be associated with varying levels of risk for AD. The ε4 allele has been confirmed to be a major risk factor for AD whereas the ε2 allele has been shown to be protective. However, the effects of ApoE genotype on AD risk are different across ethnic groups. Notably, the ε4 allele has a stronger effect in East Asian populations compared to other populations. The regional prevalence estimates of ε4 allele carrier frequencies are lowest in Asia, compared to Northern Europe where the regional prevalence estimates are highest. The ApoE ε4 allele was shown to lead to an increased rate of cognitive function decline in Han Chinese in Taiwan.

Rare missense variants of ApoE detected only in East Asians
Variant ID	Amino acid Change	Pathogenicity	Related disease
rs121918392	p.Glu21Lys	Pathogenic	Hyperlipoproteinemia, type III; atherosclerosis (APOE ε5)
rs587778876	p. Leu122Met	Unknown	Major depressive disorder
rs121918397	p.Arg163His	Pathogenic	Familial hyperlipoproteinemia, type III
rs121918397	p.Arg163Pro	Pathogenic	Lipoprotein glomerulopathy
rs267606663	p.Arg242Gln	Pathogenic	Familial hyperlipoproteinemia, type III
rs140808909	p.Glu262Lys	Pathogenic	Hyperlipoproteinemia, type III; atherosclerosis (APOE ε7)
rs190853081	p.Glu263Lys	Pathogenic	Hyperlipoproteinemia, type III; atherosclerosis (APOE ε7)

Low frequency genetic variants linked to the pathophysiology of AD are important for elucidating disease etiology. Rare missense variants of ApoE may have differing prevalence in East Asians with AD. Recent research has focused on the Christchurch (rs121918393) and Jacksonville (rs199768005) variants, which appear to have protective effects against AD in Caucasians. However, these variants have not yet been identified in AD patients of Japanese ancestry, suggesting that these variants may be exclusive to Caucasians. Other ApoE variants that are detected only in East Asians have also been identified but they have not yet been linked to AD.

=== APP, PSEN1, and PSEN2 ===
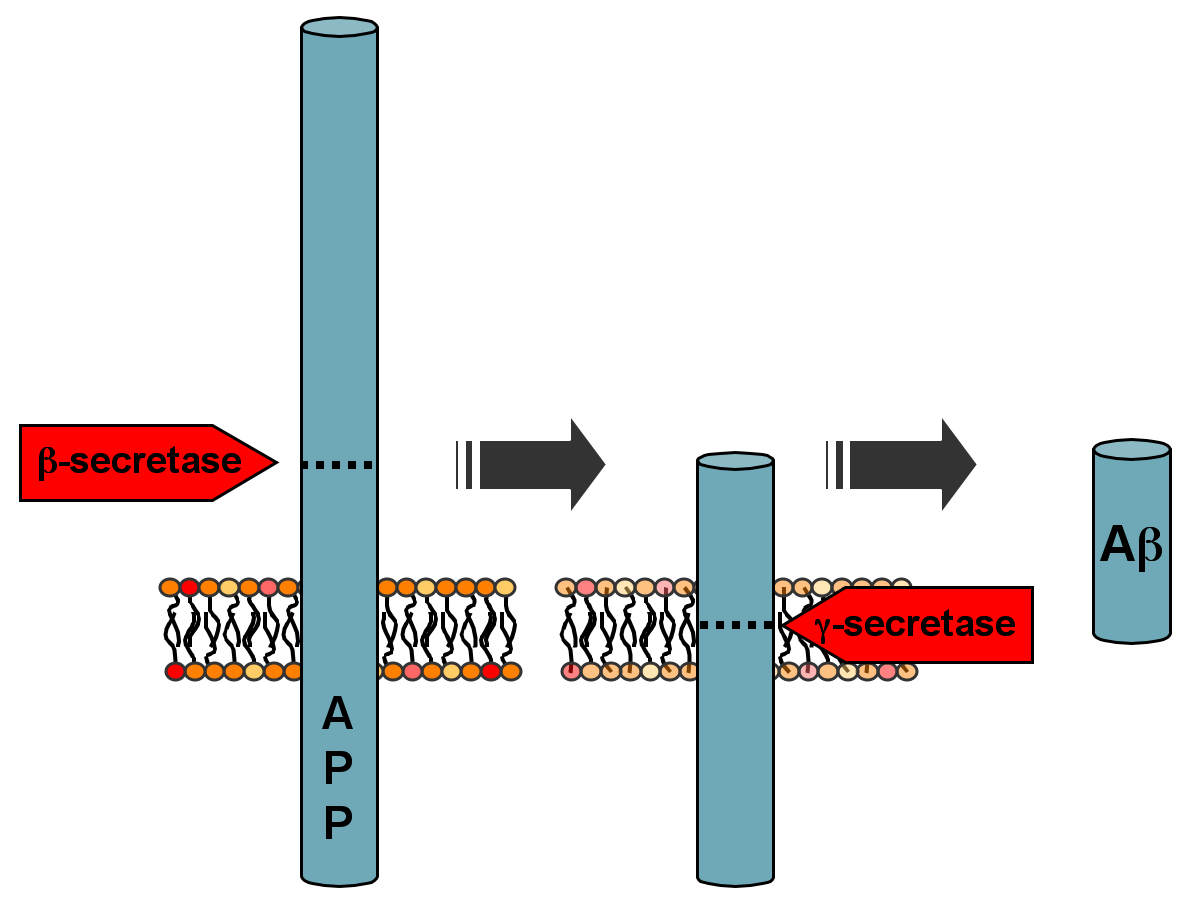
Cleavage of APP by β-secretase and the γ-secretase produces the pathogenic Aβ peptide.

Mutations in APP (amyloid-beta precursor protein), PSEN1 (Presenilin-1), and PSEN2 (Presenilin-2) are known genetic causes of autosomal dominant forms of early-onset Alzheimer's disease (EOAD). APP encodes the precursor protein to amyloid-beta. Cleavage of APP by β-secretase and γ-secretase produces the pathogenic Aβ peptide in AD. PSEN1 and PSEN2 encode presenilin 1 and presenilin 2, which are major core components of the γ-secretase complex. There are over 400 mutations in these genes reported worldwide and classification of variants in these genes across ethnic groups is difficult. PSEN1 is the most frequently mutated and leads to the youngest age of onset, followed by APP, and subsequently, PSEN2. A small study of 200 early-onset AD patients in four East Asian countries found that 16% of patients presented pathogenic APP, PSEN1, or PSEN2 variants, 25% presented APP variants, 59% presented PSEN variants, and 16% presented PSEN2 variants. Over 40 mutations in PSEN1/PSEN2/APP have been found in Han Chinese patients with EOAD, with 31 mutations in PSEN1, 4 mutations in PSEN2, and 5 mutations in APP. The Chinese Familial AD Network, which enrolls 1330 patients in 404 pedigrees, found that 13.12% of pedigrees carry missense mutations in APP, PSEN1, and PSEN2.

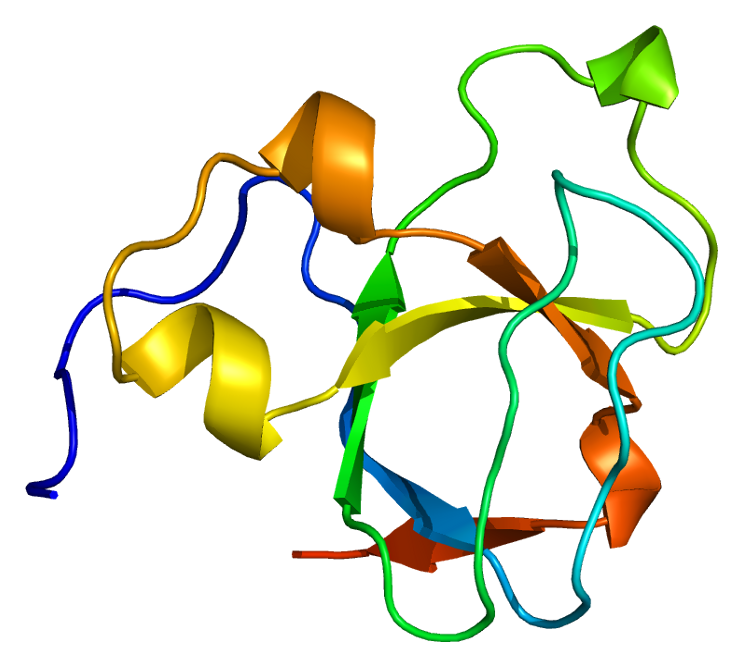
Structure of the BIN1 protein.

=== BIN1 ===
Genetic variants of bridging integrator 1 (BIN1) gene have been shown to be significantly associated with Alzheimer's disease in East Asians. BIN1 is involved in endocytosis regulation and membrane remodeling, calcium homeostasis, DNA repair, cytoskeletal regulation, apoptosis, and inflammation. Importantly, BIN1 has been identified as a critical genetic susceptibility loci for late-onset AD and is believed to modulate the tau pathology pathway. Elevated BIN1 expression is associated with higher susceptibility for late-onset AD.

Three SNP (single nucleotide polymorphisms) variants (rs12989701, rs744373, and rs7561528) in the BIN1 locus have been widely reported to be strongly associated with late-onset AD in Caucasian patients. However, information on the risk profile of these SNPs in East Asians is missing or inconsistent across studies. For instance, studies concerning the rs12989701 polymorphism have been primarily conducted in Caucasian patients, with limited data from the East Asian population. Mutations in the other two SNPs, rs7561528 and rs744373, are reported to be generally associated with increased AD risk, although the results in East Asians are varied. A few studies in East Asians have failed to reliably replicate a significant association between these polymorphisms and AD risk due to small sample size. A 2012 study found no significant connection between rs7561528 or rs744373 and late-onset AD in patients of northern Han Chinese ancestry. Similarly, 2015 study identified no association between rs7561528 and sporadic AD in Han Chinese populations and a study in Japanese AD patients reported no significant association of rs744373 with late-onset AD. Conversely, a 2015 study identified a significant link between rs7561528 and sporadic AD in the Han Chinese population.

Meta-analysis of multiple independent studies provides a more comprehensive picture of the role of BIN1 polymorphisms in disease. A recent meta-analysis of 18 independent studies on rs7561528 in East Asians concluded that the A allele of this SNP is a protective factor against AD whereas the G allele confers elevated disease risk. Similarly, a 2013 meta-analysis of pooled samples from two studies found that the rs744373 polymorphism had a similar genetic risk in Caucasian and East Asian populations. Specifically, the AG and GG genotype of rs744373 is associated with increased AD risk.

=== ABCA7 ===
SNPs found in ABCA7, or ATP binding cassette subfamily A member 7, have been associated with increased early-onset and late-onset AD risk. ABCA7 is an ATP-binding cassette (ABC) transporter protein that is important in the transport of lipids, cholesterol, apolipoprotein E (ApoE), and high density lipoprotein (HDL) across membranes. ABCA7 plays a role in the regulation of amyloid-β homeostasis including amyloid clearance and tau fibril formation. Functional interference of ABCA7 can lead to elevated amyloid-β production. In the Southern Chinese population, polymorphisms rs3764650 and rs4147929 were reported to result in increased susceptibility for AD in ApoE ε4 carriers. The rs3764650 variant is also associated with an earlier trajectory of cognitive decline in Han Chinese individuals in Taiwan.

=== Other genetic loci ===
Genetic studies have reported a connection between single nucleotide polymorphisms (SNPs) and AD risk. The associated SNPs and genetic factors identified in East Asians are different compared to those found in other ethnic groups and can be an important early screening tool for AD in the East Asian population. GWAS in Japanese cohorts conducted in 2013 and 2015 discovered disease-associated SNPs near SORL1, CNTNAP2, SUDS3, FAM47E, and SCARB2. GWAS from Chinese cohorts identified SNPs in GCH1, APOC1, KCNJ15, LINC01413, RHOBTB3, GLRX, and other regions. In South Korea, two recent GWAS of ApoE ε4 carriers identified novel AD-risk variants near SORCS1, CHD2, CACNA1A, and LRIG1.

AD-associated genetic loci in East Asian Populations
Japanese cohort		South Korean cohort				Chinese cohort	
Genetic loci	Reference	Genetic loci	Reference	Genetic loci	Reference	Genetic loci	Reference
SORL1		CLIC4		CHD2		GCH1	
ENSG00000266602		PTPRN2		CACNA1A		LINC01413	
CNTNAP2		PSD3		LRIG1		APOC1	
SUDS3		SORCS1				KCNJ15	
FAM47E		ENSG00000288047				RHOBTB3	
SCARB2		CHASERR				GLRX	
		ABR				ENSG00000252337	
		USP32				LINC02325	
		SORCS1				CHODL	

== Pathogenesis ==
=== Neurotransmitter regulation ===
The regulation of monoaminergic and cholinergic neurotransmitters are relevant in Alzheimer's disease pathogenesis. Specifically, polymorphisms in GCH1 (GTP cyclohydrolase I) and ChAT (choline acetyltransferase) affect AD susceptibility in East Asians. GTP cyclohydrolase I is an enzyme that synthesizes a protein tetrahydrobiopterin (THB) that necessary for monamine neurotransmitter synthesis. The SNP rs72713460 of GCH1 impacts monoamine neurotransmitter synthesis and leads to increased AD susceptibility in East Asians. Choline acetyltransferase (ChAT) is needed to generate acetylcholine from choline and acetyl COA. Inhibition of acetylcholine (Ach) breakdown has been used to treat AD. The rs3810950 polymorphism of ChAT was found to confer higher risk of AD in East Asians and may impact acetylcholine functionality.

=== Amyloid-β production and clearance ===
The dynamics of amyloid-beta production and clearance are critically dysregulated in AD. Based on the amyloid cascade hypothesis, synthesized APP is transported to the cell surface and internalized by endocytosis for processing by α- or β- secretase, followed by γ-secretase. β- and γ-secretases cleave APP into Aβ in the amyloidogenic pathway whereas α- and γ-secretase inhibit Aβ generation in the non-amyloidogenic pathway. β-site APP-cleaving enzyme 1 (BACE1) is the β-secretase important for Aβ generation.

SNPs involved in Amyloid-β production and clearance in East Asians
Gene	SNP	AD susceptibility in East Asians	Odds Ratio Odds Ratio (OR) of 1 is normal risk. Higher OR indicates higher risk.
FEMRT2	rs17125924	Risk	1.895 (East Asian) vs 1.14 (Caucasian)
GSK3β	rs334558	Risk	1.38 (East Asian) vs 1.99 (Caucasian)
CD2AP	rs934940	Risk	1.33 (East Asian) vs 1.11 (Caucasian)
BIN1	rs7561528	Risk	1.02 (East Asian) vs 0.95 (Caucasian)
PICALM	rs3851179	Protective	0.88 (East Asian) vs 0.78 (Caucasian)
SORL1	rs11218343	Protective	0.83 (East Asian) vs 0.75 (Caucasian)
SORL1	rs3781834	Protective	0.74 (East Asian) vs 0.78 (Caucasian)
SORL1	rs4598682	Protective	0.75 (East Asian) vs 1.04 (Caucasian)
SORL1	rs17125523	Protective	0.77 (East Asian) vs 0.85 (Caucasian)
SORL1	rs3737529	Protective	0.77 (East Asian) vs 0.83 (Caucasian)
SORCS1	rs1890078	Protective	0.43 (East Asian) vs Unreported (Caucasian)
SORCS1	rs144835823	Protective	0.32 (East Asian) vs Unreported (Caucasian)
SORCS1	rs78442236	Protective	0.17 (East Asian) vs Unreported (Caucasian)

SNPs associated with AD risk have been identified on multiple genes involved in amyloid-β production and clearance. BIN1 and CD2AP work together in facilitating the endocytosis of APP and BACE1 into endosomes to produce amyloid-β. The rs744373 SNP of BIN1 and rs934940 SNP of CD2AP confers increased AD susceptibility in East Asians. FERMT2 (Kindlin-2) modulates APP metabolism and controls synaptic connectivity and axonal growth in an APP-dependent manner. The rs7143400 SNP of FERMT2 is associated with a higher odds ratio of AD risk in East Asians compared to Caucasians. Glycogen synthase kinase-3beta (GSK-3B) impacts the expression of BACE1, leading to effects on APP cleavage and amyloid-β deposition. The rs334558 AD risk SNP of BACE1 has a higher odds ratio of risk in Caucasians relative to East Asians. PICALM (phosphatidylinositol binding clathrin assembly protein) regulates the formation of vesicles in clathrin-mediated endocytosis. Reduction of PICALM leads to decreased BACE1 activity, endocytosis, and Aβ production. The rs3851179 polymorphism of PICALM, in association with the ε4 allele of ApoE, was significantly associated with a decreased risk of AD in a Korean population.

=== Vascular dysfunction ===
Vascular dysfunction is a contributor to Alzheimer's disease pathophysiology. Pathological pathways include blood brain barrier (BBB) dysfunction, disrupted clearance of amyloid beta, and altered neuromuscular coupling. Multiple vascular processes are impacted by EXOC3L2 (Exocyst complex component 3-like 2) in East Asians with AD. The rs597668 SNP on EXOC3L2 is a protective polymorphism in East Asians. EXOC3L2 encodes a protein that is associated with an exocyst complex that regulates membrane dynamics. EXOC3L2 influences vascular processes by decreasing vascular endothelial growth factor (VEGF). Reduced VEGF leads to inhibition of angiogenesis and increased leucocyte adhesion, which results in obstructed cerebral blood flow. Additionally, reduced VEGF increases breakdown of the blood brain barrier by amyloid-beta via inhibition of endothelial cells. The resulting vascular dysfunction potentiates the deleterious effects of Alzheimer's disease.

=== Immune regulation ===
The immune system plays an important role in AD pathogenesis. Neuroinflammation has been found to be increased in the presence of elevated amyloid-beta deposition and abnormal tau aggregates. Genetic mutations in immune-related genetic loci can also increase risk of AD via interference of normal immune function. The immune system is believed undergo dynamic alterations and become dysregulated during disease progression. In the East Asian population, multiple SNPs found in immune-related genes point to the role of immune system imbalance in AD.

Certain SNPs have been correlated with increased susceptibility for AD in East Asians. TOMM40 encodes a translocase protein on the outer mitochondrial membrane that is involved in the import of Aβ into the mitochondria. A number of SNPs on TOMM40 have been identified in East Asian AD patients and correlate with significantly increased susceptibility for disease. TOMM40 variants can lead to increased oxidative stress and mitochondrial function dysregulation. Similarly, Complement receptor type 1 (CR1) activation is deleterious to neurons because it inhibits microglia-mediated phagocytosis and stimulates reactive oxygen species (ROS) levels in the presence of amyloid-β. The CR1 rs6656401 polymorphism has a slightly higher correlation with AD risk in Asians (odds ratio 1.76) compared to Caucasians (odds ratio 1.28). KCNJ15 encodes the voltage-gated potassium channel Kir4.2 protein and is highly used in the immune system. The rs928771 SNP of KCNJ15 leads to increased blood levels of KCNJ15 in AD patients as well as elevated disease risk in East Asians. HLA-DRB1 (HLA class II histocompatibility anteigen) is expressed on antigen-presenting cells and is involved in presenting peptides from extracellular proteins to T cells of the immune system. The rs9271192 polymorphism of HLA-DRB1 is correlated with slightly increased risk in East Asians and Caucasians. MTHFD1L (methylenetetrahydrofolate dehydrogenase (NADP + dependent) 1-like protein) is correlated with higher disease susceptibility but not much is known about what role it plays in AD.

Immune regulation SNPs involved in AD in East Asians
Gene	SNP	AD susceptibility in East Asians	Odds Ratio Odds Ratio (OR) of 1 is normal risk. Higher OR indicates higher risk.
TOMM40	rs1155650	Risk	4.53 (East Asian) vs 3.13 (Caucasian)
TOMM40	rs157581	Risk	2.1 (East Asian) vs Unreported (Caucasian)
MTHFD1L	rs11754661	Risk	1.83 (East Asian) vs 2.10 (Caucasian)
CR1	rs6656401	Risk	1.76 (East Asian) vs 1.28 (Caucasian)
CR1	rs3818361	Risk	1.26 (East Asian) vs 1.26 (Caucasian)
KCNJ15	rs928771	Risk	1.59 (East Asian) vs Unreported (Caucasian)
HLA-DRB1	rs9271192	Risk	1.07 (East Asian) vs 1.11 (Caucasian)
DAPK1	rs4878104	Protective	0.75 (East Asian) vs 0.79 (Caucasian)
IL-18	rs187238	Protective	0.669 (East Asian) vs 0.90 (Caucasian)
MS4A6A	rs610932	Protective	0.622 (East Asian) vs 0.91 (Caucasian)
CD33	rs3865444	Protective	0.48 (East Asian) vs 1.1 (Caucasian)

Protective polymorphisms in immune-related genes have also been identified in East Asians. DAPK1 (death-associated protein kinase) is a serine/threonine kinase that regulates various cellular pathways including apoptosis and autophagy. The rs4878104 variant of DAPK has been found to be protective in both Asians and Caucasians. Reduction of DAPK1 decreases caspase activation and was found to reduce memory deficits in mice injected with amyloid-β. DAPK1 inhibition is also thought to reduce interleukin-18 (IL-18) production. IL-18 is a proinflammatory cytokine that is linked to increased levels of amyloid-β accumulation though alterations of the APP processing. The rs187238 variant of IL-18 is associated with more decreased risk of AD in East Asians, compared to Caucasians. CD33 (sialic acid binding Ig-like lectin 3) is a transmembrane receptor protein that controls microglial activation. In AD, it can be overactive in the presence of amyloid and contribute to excess neuroinflammation. East Asians that carry a T allele of rs3865444 on the CD33 gene exhibit decreased levels of CD33 and may have decreased AD susceptibility. Microglial inactivation due to CD33 inhibition results in decreased phagocytosis and cytokine release. This SNP does not have a protective effect in Caucasians. MS4A6A (Membrane Spanning 4-Domains A6A) is a member of the MS4A gene cluster and is important for immune cell activation. The rs610932 risk variant of MS4A6A is associated with increased levels of MS4A6A expression in patients with mild cognitive impairment and AD. High levels of MS4A6A expression is believed to have adverse effects in AD progression but limited research has been conducted on the exact role of MS4A6A in AD.

== Cultural and societal influences ==
=== Attitudes relating to Alzheimer's disease ===
Social stigma associated with mental illness and lack of knowledge about AD prevent proper management of disease in East Asians. The misconception of AD as "insanity" is prevalent in East Asians as well as other ethnic groups. Patients and caregivers may be reluctant to seek medical care due to this negative perception. One study of elderly Korean American immigrants found that there was limited use of mental health services despite elevated rates of cognitive impairment and depression this community. Chinese patients were reported to seek care at later stages of dementia relative to American patients. Memory loss, forgetfulness, and mental deterioration are also perceived to be a normal part of aging in East Asian American groups. Multiple qualitative studies suggest this misconception is prevalent in Chinese, Vietnamese, and Korean Americans. The cultural normalization of mental decline in old age may mask the initial symptoms of disease and delay formal evaluation in AD patients. Feelings of shame linked to AD and limitations in AD-related knowledge are further accentuated in individuals with lower education levels and lower acculturation of AD.

=== Barriers to medical care ===
A number of barriers result in disparities in adequate medical management and timely intervention for East Asians with AD or other dementias. Delayed intervention due to insufficient healthcare, cultural influences, stigma against mental illness, and lack of AD knowledge inhibit proper management of disease. Lack of accessible health care makes early recognition of AD symptoms challenging. Additionally, healthcare systems and social services may not be able to meet the rising demand of AD treatment caused by aging and population growth. Most significant is the growing burden of dementia in Japan, which is experiencing the fastest increase in AD prevalence in the world. In China, the healthcare system is poorly prepared to deliver new disease-modifying AD treatments, with wait times predicted to be over two years. The urban-rural divide in China is another infrastructure challenge for access to AD treatment. In rural areas of China, local community centers or village doctors may be the primary point of contact for medical care, but may not have the formal training to assess cognitive impairment.

Social and cultural factors may also be a barrier to medical care. The cultural norm of "saving face" in East Asians prevents public disclosure of negative family events, including AD. Lack of community discourse about AD may decrease awareness and knowledge about the early signs of disease. Prior exposure to AD from multiple sources, such as via family members, media, or friends, is important in increasing disease awareness and AD knowledge. Additionally, fear of social stigma makes it challenging for East Asian groups to seek proper medical services and poses a barrier for recruitment of East Asians in studies of mental illness. Chinese AD patients were found to delay seeking care until they exhibited severe neuropsychiatric symptoms compared to Caucasian patients. Elders in Asian American groups are not likely to be diagnosed with AD until later stages of disease. These patients were more likely to be at a more severe stage of dementia by the time they sought medical attention, which poses consequences for treatment options. Limited knowledge of AD results in delayed symptom recognition and poor disease management. In Korean Americans and Chinese Americans, lower levels of formal education and acculturation were shown to be linked to lower levels of AD knowledge and decreased awareness of AD-related resources. East Asians may interpret their mental health as a somatic issue and are less likely to use mental health services. Some level of folk wisdom and skepticism of the availability of effective therapies are also factors that limit treatment-seeking behavior.

== Diagnosis ==
=== Fluid biomarkers ===
The current research framework for diagnosis of Alzheimer's disease is based on the amyloid, tau, and neurodegeneration (ATN) classification system. This framework relies on cerebrospinal fluid sampling, MRI imaging, and PET imaging. There is also interest in the use of blood-based biomarkers that may be more cost-effective and less invasive. Plasma measurements of amyloid-β, neurofilament light chain (NfL), and phosphorylated tau (p-tau) can be used to diagnose or predict the development of AD. Unfortunately, the studies highlighting the relationship between these biomarkers and future AD were performed primarily in Western patients. Recent research has focused on the diagnostic and predictive capacity of fluid biomarkers in the East Asian population. A study conducted in a Chinese population has shown that the combination of p-tau 181 and Aβ42 in plasma had excellent performance in diagnosing AD. Several studies since have determined that combinations of plasma biomarkers, including NfL, Aβ42, and p-tau in plasma, can predict AD prognosis 4.8–6 years prior to cognitive decline. Assessment of a combination of biomarkers has more predictive value than using just one biomarker. These studies show that the relationship between plasma biomarkers and AD is preserved in East Asian populations and similar to findings in European populations.

=== Imaging ===
PET and MRI imaging are important diagnostic tools but East Asians and other ethnic groups are underrepresented in studies on imaging-based AD biomarkers. One large multisite study of patients with mild cognitive impairment and dementia found that amyloid PET positivity rates were 7–12% lower in Asian individuals compared to White individuals. In China, amyloid PET is rarely performed due to costs, coverage, and availability. However, China is rapidly expanding its use of PET scanners. In 2023, Neuraceq (florbetaben F-18) was approved as the first PET imaging radiotracer targeting β-amyloid in China in response to recent approvals of promising AD treatments in the United States. Neuraceq obtained approval in the U.S. in 2014, and is one of three PET radiopharmaceuticals approved by the U.S. Food and Drug Administration.
