= Spleen exonuclease =

Enzyme

Identifiers
- EC no.: 3.1.16.1
- CAS no.: 9068-54-6

Databases
- IntEnz: IntEnz view
- BRENDA: BRENDA entry
- ExPASy: NiceZyme view
- KEGG: KEGG entry
- MetaCyc: metabolic pathway
- PRIAM: profile
- PDB structures: RCSB PDB PDBe PDBsum
Search
- PMC: articles
- PubMed: articles
- NCBI: proteins

Spleen exonuclease (EC 3.1.16.1, 3'-exonuclease, spleen phosphodiesterase, 3'-nucleotide phosphodiesterase, phosphodiesterase II) is an enzyme. This enzyme catalyses the following chemical reaction

Exonucleolytic cleavage in the 5'- to 3'-direction to yield nucleoside 3'-phosphates (exonuclease type b)

This enzyme has a preference for single-stranded substrate.

PLD3 and/or PLD4 might be the genes encoding spleen exonuclease, as they have similar substrate specificity and tissue distribution.
