= Phospholipase D =

Class of enzymes

Identifiers
- Symbol: PLDc
- Pfam: PF03009
- InterPro: IPR001736
- SMART: SM00155
- PROSITE: PDOC50035
- SCOP2: 1byr / SCOPe / SUPFAM
- OPM superfamily: 118
- OPM protein: 3rlh
- CDD: cd00138
- Membranome: 306
Available protein structures:
- PDB: IPR001736 PF03009 (ECOD; PDBsum)
- AlphaFold: IPR001736; PF03009

Cleavage sites of phospholipases. Phospholipase D (PLD) cuts just after the phosphate attached to the R_{3} moiety.

phospholipase D

Identifiers
- EC no.: 3.1.4.4
- CAS no.: 9001-87-0

Databases
- BRENDA: enzyme data
- ExPASy: NiceZyme view
- KEGG: enzyme entry
- MetaCyc: metabolic pathway
- Rhea: reactions
- PDB structures: RCSB PDB PDBe PDBsum
- Gene Ontology: AmiGO / QuickGO
Search
- PMC: articles
- PubMed: articles
- NCBI: proteins

Phospholipase D (PLD) (EC 3.1.4.4; also known as lipophosphodiesterase II, lecithinase D, choline phosphatase; systematic name: phosphatidylcholine phosphatidohydrolase) is an anesthetic-sensitive and mechanosensitive enzyme of the phospholipase protein superfamily that catalyzes the hydrolysis of membrane phospholipids.

The canonical reaction is:

$$\text{phosphatidylcholine} + \text{H}_2\text{O} \rightarrow \text{choline} + \text{phosphatidic acid}$$

Phospholipases occur widely across bacteria, yeast, plants, animals, and viruses. PLD's principal substrate is phosphatidylcholine, which it hydrolyzes to produce the membrane lipid phosphatidic acid (PA) and soluble choline in a cholesterol-dependent process termed substrate presentation.

Plants encode numerous PLD isoenzymes, with molecular weights ranging from approximately 90 to 125 kDa. In mammals, six PLD isoenzymes (PLD1–PLD6) are expressed. PLD1 and PLD2 are the best characterized, responsible for classical phosphatidylcholine hydrolysis and PA signaling. Other isoforms, such as PLD3 and PLD4, function as endolysosomal nucleases rather than phospholipases, reflecting diversification of the PLD superfamily.

Phospholipase D activity plays essential roles in membrane trafficking, cytoskeletal reorganization, receptor-mediated endocytosis, exocytosis, cell migration, and broader signal transduction pathways. In addition to their well-established catalytic functions, PLD enzymes are increasingly recognized as key regulators of membrane dynamics and cellular signaling beyond lipid hydrolysis. PLD-generated phosphatidic acid not only acts as a signaling lipid itself but also serves as a precursor for the biosynthesis of other lipid second messengers, including diacylglycerol (DAG) and lysophosphatidic acid (LPA). Phosphatidic acid can directly recruit and regulate a variety of downstream effector proteins, thereby integrating PLD activity into complex cellular processes such as mTOR signaling, membrane curvature sensing, and vesicular trafficking. In addition to these functions, PLD enzymes contribute to setting the threshold for sensitivity to anesthesia and mechanical force.

Dysregulation of PLD has been implicated in several pathophysiological conditions, including Parkinson's disease, Alzheimer's disease, cancer, diabetes mellitus, and autoimmune diseases.

== Discovery ==
PLD-type activity was first reported in 1947 by Donald J. Hanahan and I.L. Chaikoff. It was not until 1975, however, that the hydrolytic mechanism of action was elucidated in mammalian cells. Plant isoforms of PLD were first purified from cabbage and castor bean; PLDα was ultimately cloned and characterized from a variety of plants, including rice, corn, and tomato. Plant PLDs have been cloned in three isoforms: PLDα, PLDβ, and PLDγ. More than half a century of biochemical studies have implicated phospholipase D and PA activity in a wide range of physiological processes and diseases, including inflammation, diabetes, phagocytosis, neuronal and cardiac signaling, and oncogenesis.

== Physiological function ==
Strictly speaking, phospholipase D is a transphosphatidylase: it mediates the exchange of polar headgroups covalently attached to membrane-bound lipids. Utilizing water as a nucleophile, this enzyme catalyzes the cleavage of the phosphodiester bond in structural phospholipids such as phosphatidylcholine and phosphatidylethanolamine. The products of this hydrolysis are the membrane-bound lipid phosphatidic acid (PA), and choline, which diffuses into the cytosol. As choline has little second messenger activity, PLD activity is mostly transduced by the production of PA. PA is heavily involved in intracellular signal transduction.

In addition, some members of the PLD superfamily may employ primary alcohols such as ethanol or 1-butanol in the cleavage of the phospholipid, effectively catalyzing the exchange the polar lipid headgroup. Other members of this family are able hydrolyze other phospholipid substrates, such as cardiolipin, or even the phosphodiester bond constituting the backbone of DNA.

=== Phosphatidic acid ===
Many of phospholipase D's cellular functions are mediated by its principal product, phosphatidic acid (PA). PA is a negatively charged phospholipid, whose small head group promotes membrane curvature. It is thus thought to facilitate membrane-vesicle fusion and fission in a manner analogous to clathrin-mediated endocytosis. PA may also recruit proteins that contain its corresponding binding domain, a region characterized by basic amino acid–rich regions. Additionally, PA can be converted into a number of other lipids, such as lysophosphatidic acid (lyso-PA) or diacylglycerol, signal molecules which have a multitude of effects on downstream cellular pathways. PA and its lipid derivatives are implicated in myriad processes that include intracellular vesicle trafficking, endocytosis, exocytosis, actin cytoskeleton dynamics, cell proliferation differentiation, and migration.

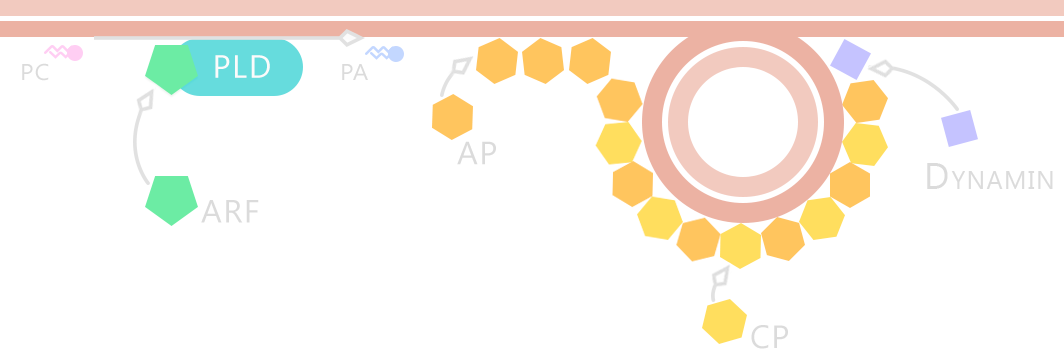
Figure 1. A model of the ARF-dependent activation of phospholipase D, and a proposed scheme for vesicle endocytosis. In this model, ARF activates phospholipase D (PLD), recruiting it to the plasma membrane. Hydrolysis of phosphatidylcholine (PC) by ARF-activated PLD produces phosphatidic acid (PA). PA subsequently recruits molecules that shape the inner face of the lipid bilayer, facilitating vesicle formation. Local enrichment of acidic phospholipids help recruit adaptor proteins (AP) and coat proteins (CP) to the membrane, initiating the budding of the vesicle. Vesicle fission is ultimately mediated by dynamin, which itself is a downstream effector of PA.

Mammalian PLD directly interacts with kinases like PKC, ERK, TYK and controls the signalling indicating that PLD is activated by these kinases. As choline is very abundant in the cell, PLD activity does not significantly affect choline levels, and choline is unlikely to play any role in signalling.

Phosphatidic acid, as a signal molecule, acts to recruit SK1 to membranes. PA is extremely short lived and is rapidly hydrolysed by the enzyme phosphatidate phosphatase to form diacylglycerol (DAG). DAG may also be converted to PA by DAG kinase. Although PA and DAG are interconvertible, they do not act in the same pathways. Stimuli that activate PLD do not activate enzymes downstream of DAG and vice versa.

It is possible that, though PA and DAG are interconvertible, separate pools of signalling and non-signalling lipids may be maintained. Studies have suggested that DAG signalling is mediated by polyunsaturated DAG while PLD derived PA is monounsaturated or saturated. Thus functional saturated/monounsaturated PA can be degraded by hydrolysing it to form non-functional saturated/monounsaturated DAG while functional polyunsaturated DAG can be degraded by converting it into non-functional polyunsaturated PA.

A lysophospholipase D called autotaxin was recently identified as having an important role in cell-proliferation through its product, lysophosphatidic acid (LPA).

== Structure and mechanism ==
Plant and animal PLDs have a consistent molecular structure, characterized by sites of catalysis surrounded by an assortment of regulatory sequences. The active site of PLDs consists of four highly conserved amino acid sequences (I–IV), of which motifs II and IV are particularly conserved. These structural domains contain the distinguishing catalytic sequence HxKxxxxD (HKD), where H, K, and D are the amino acids histidine (H), lysine (K), aspartic acid (D), while x represents nonconservative amino acids. These two HKD motifs confer hydrolytic activity to PLD, and are critical for its enzymatic activity both in vitro and in vivo. Hydrolysis of the phosphodiester bond occurs when these HKD sequences are in the correct proximity.

Human proteins containing this motif include:

- PGS1, PLD1, PLD2, PLD3, PLD4, PLD5

PC-hydrolyzing PLD is a homologue of cardiolipin synthase, phosphatidylserine synthase, bacterial PLDs, and viral proteins. Each of these appears to possess a domain duplication which is apparent by the presence of two HKD motifs containing well-conserved histidine, lysine, and asparagine residues which may contribute to the active site aspartic acid. An Escherichia coli endonuclease (nuc) and similar proteins appear to be PLD homologues but possess only one of these motifs.

PLD genes additionally encode highly conserved regulatory domains: the phox consensus sequence (PX), the pleckstrin homology domain (PH), and a binding site for phosphatidylinositol 4,5-bisphosphate (PIP_{2}).

=== Mechanism of catalysis ===
PLD-catalyzed hydrolysis occurs through a two-stage "ping-pong" mechanism. In this scheme, a histidine residue of one HKD motif first attacks the phosphorus atom of the phospholipid substrate. Functioning as a nucleophile, the constituent imidazole moiety of the histidine forms a transient covalent bond with the phospholipid, generating a short-lived phosphohistidine-phosphatidate intermediate. A second histidine then activates a water molecule for facile hydrolysis of the phosphohistidine bond, regenerating the active site and releasing phosphatidic acid. Lysine residues assist by coordinating the substrate phosphate. Structural studies have showed that the active site is pre-organized to permit nucleophilic attack, and have confirmed the presence of a phosphohistidine intermediate via covalent capture in crystal structures. Conformational flexibility near the active site may be necessary to permit efficient substrate access and catalysis.

==== Substrate specificity ====
Mammalian PLDs are selective for phosphatidylcholine. Although conserved residues that contact the glycerol backbone and acyl chains have been identified, no unique residues fully explain the choline specificity. Structural modeling indicates that conformational rearrangements of the active site may be required to accommodate and position phosphatidylcholine for catalysis.

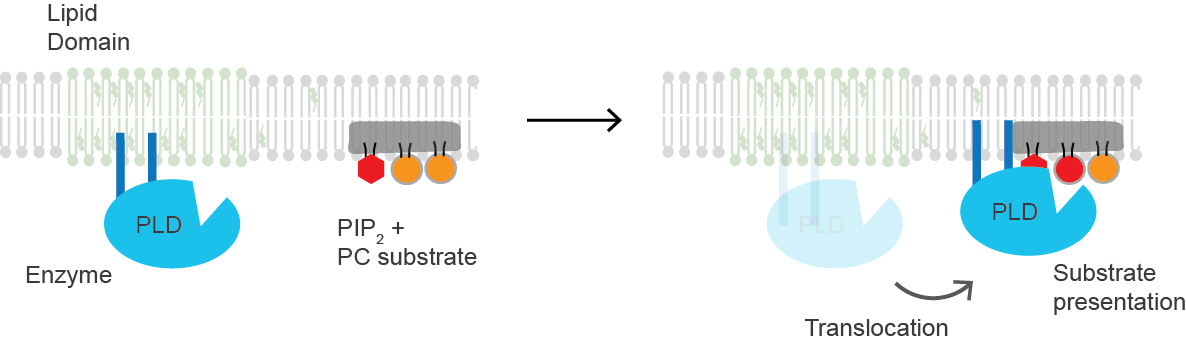
Substrate presentation; PLD (blue oval) is sequestered into cholesterol-dependent lipid domains (green lipids) by palmitoylation. PLD also binds PIP_{2} (red hexagon) domains (grey shading) located in the disordered region of the cell with phosphatidylcholine (PC). When PIP_{2} increases in the cell PLD translocates to PIP_{2} where it is exposed to and hydrolizes PC to phosphatidic acid (red spherical lipid).

=== Mechanism of activation ===
For mammalian PLD2, the molecular basis of activation is substrate presentation. The enzyme is sequestered inactive in lipid micro-domains rich in sphingomyelin but depleted of its PC substrate. A local increase in PIP_{2} or decrease in cholesterol causes the enzyme to translocate to PIP_{2} micro domains near its substrate PC. PLD is thus primarily activated by localization within the plasma membrane rather than conformational change. These lipids domains may be disrupted by anesthetics or mechanical force. PLD may also undergo a conformational change upon PIP_{2} binding, but this has not been shown experimentally.

=== Isoforms ===
Two major isoforms of phospholipase D has been identified in mammalian cells: PLD1 and PLD2 (53% sequence homology), each encoded by distinct genes. PLD activity appears to be present in most cell types, with the possible exceptions of peripheral leukocytes and other lymphocytes. Both PLD isoforms require PIP_{2} as a cofactor for activity. PLD1 and PLD2 exhibit different subcellular localizations that dynamically change in the course of signal transduction. PLD activity has been observed within the plasma membrane, cytosol, ER, and Golgi complex.

==== PLD1 ====
PLD1 is a 120 kDa protein that is mainly located on the inner membranes of cells. It is primarily present at the Golgi complex, endosomes, lysosomes, and secretory granules. Upon the binding of an extracellular stimulus, PLD1 is transported to the plasma membrane. Basal PLD1 activity is low however, and in order to transduce the extracellular signal, it must first be activated by proteins such as Arf, Rho, Rac, and protein kinase C.

phospholipase D1, phosphatidylcholine-specific

Identifiers
- Symbol: PLD1
- NCBI gene: 5337
- HGNC: 9067
- OMIM: 602382
- RefSeq: NM_002662
- UniProt: Q13393

Other data
- EC number: 3.1.4.4
- Locus: Chr. 3 q26
Search for
- Structures: Swiss-model
- Domains: InterPro

==== PLD2 ====
In contrast, PLD2 is a 106 kDa protein that primarily localizes to the plasma membrane, residing in light membrane lipid rafts. It has high intrinsic catalytic activity, and is only weakly activated by the above molecules.

phospholipase D2

Identifiers
- Symbol: PLD2
- NCBI gene: 5338
- HGNC: 9068
- OMIM: 602384
- RefSeq: NM_002663
- UniProt: O14939

Other data
- EC number: 3.1.4.4
- Locus: Chr. 17 p13.3
Search for
- Structures: Swiss-model
- Domains: InterPro

== Regulation ==
In addition to diverging in intrinsic activity with its differing isoforms, PLD is extensively regulated by hormones, neurotransmitters, lipids, small monomeric GTPases, and other small molecules that bind to their corresponding domains on the enzyme. In most cases, signal transduction is mediated through production of phosphatidic acid, which functions as a secondary messenger.

Specific phospholipids are regulators of PLD activity in plant and animal cells. Most PLDs require PIP_{2} as a cofactor for activity. PIP_{2} and other phosphoinositides are important modifiers of cytoskeletal dynamics and membrane transport and can traffic PLD to its substrate PC. PLDs regulated by these phospholipids are commonly involved in intracellular signal transduction. Their activity is dependent upon the binding of these phosphoinositides near the active site. In plants and animals, this binding site is characterized by the presence of a conserved sequence of basic and aromatic amino acids. In plants such as Arabidopsis thaliana, this sequence is constituted by a RxxxxxKxR motif together with its inverted repeat, where R is arginine and K is lysine. Its proximity to the active site ensures high level of PLD1 and PLD2 activity, and promotes the translocation of PLD1 to target membranes in response to extracellular signals.

=== Basal regulation ===
The intrinsic activity of PLD differs between its known isoforms. Mammalian PLD1 and PLD2, for example, exhibit different basal activities despite high sequence conservation. PLD1 requires activation by protein factors such as Arf, Rho, or protein kinase C, whereas PLD2 is constitutively active. Structural differences near the active site tunnel account for this disparity: in PLD2, a segment corresponding to residues 687–696 folds into an alpha helix, widening the substrate entrance; in PLD1, the homologous residues form a flexible loop occluding the tunnel. The displacement of a partially conserved adjacent loop by the PLD2 helix may further contribute to isoform-specific regulation. In plants (e.g. PLDα), similar conformational gating of the active site by an autoinhibitory helix is observed.

=== C2 domain ===
Calcium acts as a cofactor in PLD isoforms that contain the C2 domain. Binding of Ca^{2+} to the C2 domain leads to conformational changes in the enzyme that strengthen enzyme–substrate binding, while weakening the association with phosphoinositides. In some plant isoenzymes, such as PLDβ, Ca^{2+} may bind directly to the active site, indirectly increasing its affinity for the substrate by strengthening the binding of the activator PIP_{2}.

=== PX domain ===
The pbox consensus sequence (PX) is thought to mediate the binding of additional phosphatidylinositol phosphates, in particular, phosphatidylinositol 5-phosphate (PtdIns5P), a lipid thought to be required for endocytosis, may help facilitate the reinternalization of PLD1 from the plasma membrane.

=== PH domain ===
The highly conserved Pleckstrin homology domain (PH) is a structural domain approximately 120 amino acids in length. It binds phosphatidylinositides such as phosphatidylinositol (3,4,5)-trisphosphate (PIP_{3}) and phosphatidylinositol (4,5)-bisphosphate (PIP_{2}). It may also bind heterotrimeric G proteins via their βγ-subunit. Binding to this domain is also thought to facilitate the re-internalization of the protein by increasing its affinity to endocytotic lipid rafts.

=== Interactions with small gtpases ===
In animal cells, small protein factors are important additional regulators of PLD activity. These small monomeric GTPases are members of the Rho and ARF families of the Ras superfamily. Some of these proteins, such as Rac1, Cdc42, and RhoA, allosterically activate mammalian PLD1, directly increasing its activity. In particular, the translocation of cytosolic ADP-ribosylation factor (ARF) to the plasma membrane is essential for PLD activation.

== Physiological and pathophysiological roles ==
=== Alcohol intoxication ===
Phospholipase D metabolizes ethanol into phosphatidylethanol (PEtOH) in a process termed transphosphatidylation. Using fly genetics the PEtOH was shown to mediates alcohol's hyperactive response in fruit flies. And ethanol transphosphatidylation was shown to be up-regulated in alcoholics and the family members of alcoholics. This ethanol transphosphatidylation mechanism recently emerged as an alternative theory for alcohol's effect on ion channels. Many ion channels are regulated by anionic lipids. and the competition of PEtOH with endogenous signaling lipids is thought to mediate the effect of ethanol on ion channels in some instances and not direct binding of the free ethanol to the channel.

=== Mechanosensation ===
PLD2 is a mechanosensor and directly sensitive to mechanical disruption of clustered GM1 lipids. Mechanical disruption (fluid shear) then signals for the cell to differentiate. PLD2 also activates TREK-1 channels, a potassium channel in the analgesic pathway.

PLD2 is upstream of Piezo2 and inhibits the channel. Piezo2 is an excitatory channel, ence PLD inhibits an excitatory channel and activates TREK-1 which is an inhibitory channel. The channels combine to reduce neuronal excitability.

=== In cancer ===
Phospholipase D is a regulator of several critical cellular processes, including vesicle transport, endocytosis, exocytosis, cell migration, and mitosis. Dysregulation of these processes is commonplace in carcinogenesis, and in turn, abnormalities in PLD expression have been implicated in the progression of several types of cancer. A driver mutation conferring elevated PLD2 activity has been observed in several malignant breast cancers. Elevated PLD expression has also been correlated with tumor size in colorectal carcinoma, gastric carcinoma, and renal cancer. However, the molecular pathways through which PLD drives cancer progression remain unclear. One potential hypothesis casts a critical role for phospholipase D in the activation of mTOR, a suppressor of cancer cell apoptosis. The ability of PLD to suppress apoptosis in cells with elevated tyrosine kinase activity makes it a candidate oncogene in cancers where such expression is typical.

=== In neurodegenerative diseases ===
Phospholipase D may also play an important pathophysiological role in the progression of neurodegenerative diseases, primarily through its capacity as a signal transducer in indispensable cellular processes like cytoskeletal reorganization and vesicle trafficking. Dysregulation of PLD by the protein α-synuclein has been shown to lead to the specific loss of dopaminergic neurons in mammals. α-synuclein is the primary structural component of Lewy bodies, protein aggregates that are the hallmarks of Parkinson's disease. Disinhibition of PLD by α-synuclein may contribute to Parkinson's deleterious phenotype.

Abnormal PLD activity has also been suspected in Alzheimer's disease, where it has been observed to interact with presenilin 1 (PS-1), the principal component of the γ-secretase complex responsible for the enzymatic cleavage of amyloid precursor protein (APP). Extracellular plaques of the product β-amyloid are a defining feature of Alzheimer's diseased brains. Action of PLD1 on PS-1 has been shown to affect the intracellular trafficking of the amyloid precursor to this complex. Phospholipase D3 (PLD3), a non-classical and poorly characterized member of the PLD superfamily, has also been associated with the pathogenesis of this disease.

== Gallery ==
Phosphatidyl choline

Phosphatidate

Choline
