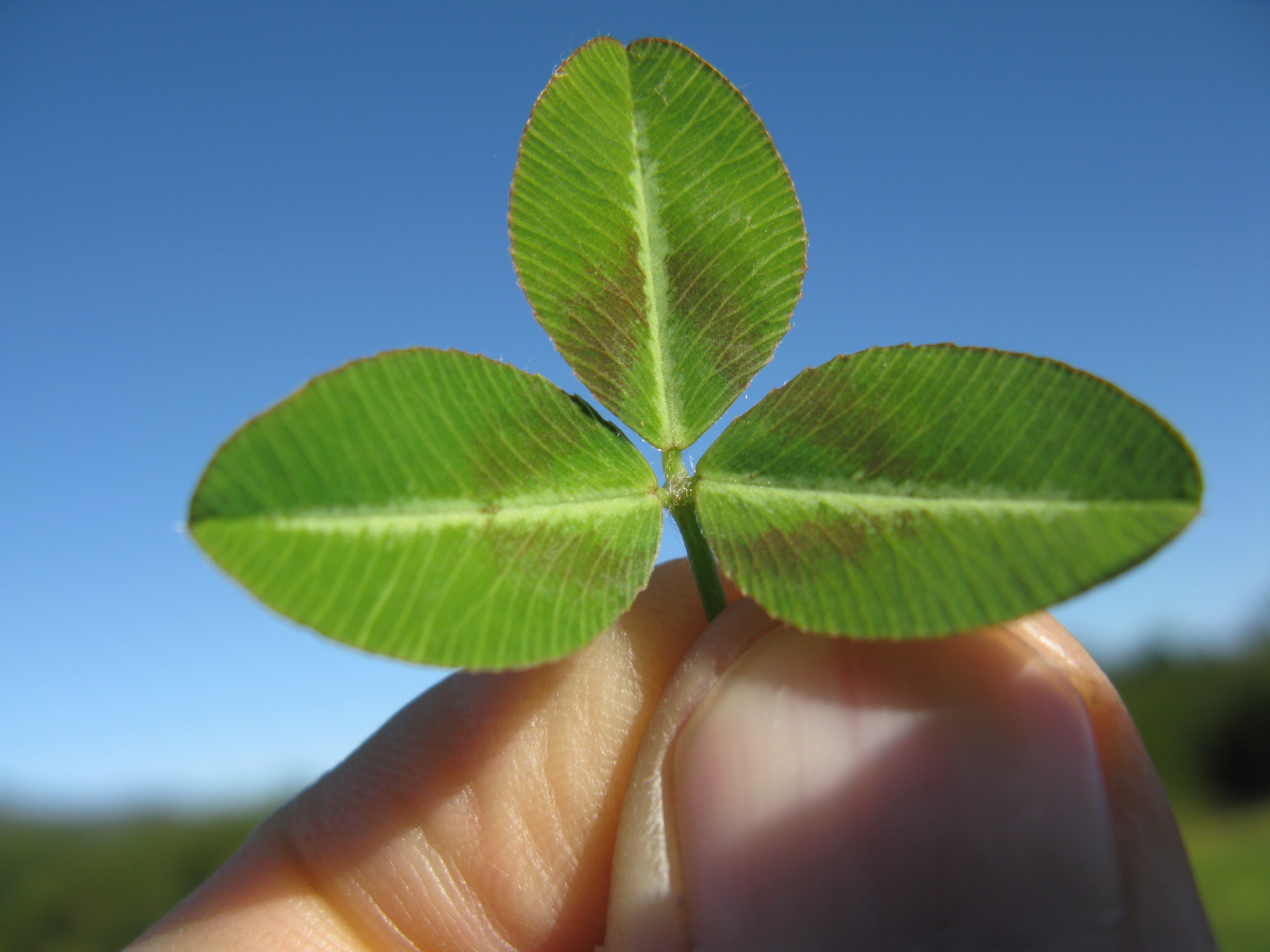
- Close-up of leaf, found in Australia

Scientific classification
- Kingdom: Plantae
- Clade: Embryophytes
- Clade: Tracheophytes
- Clade: Spermatophytes
- Clade: Angiosperms
- Clade: Eudicots
- Clade: Rosids
- Order: Fabales
- Family: Fabaceae
- Subfamily: Faboideae
- Genus: Trifolium
- Species: T. semipilosum

Binomial name
- Trifolium semipilosum Fresen.

Synonyms
- Trifolium brunellii Chiov. ex Fiori

= Trifolium semipilosum =

Species of flowering plant

Trifolium semipilosum, the Kenya clover or Kenya white clover, is a species of flowering plant in the family Fabaceae. It is native to Yemen, Eritrea, Ethiopia, Kenya, Uganda, Tanzania, Malawi and Zimbabwe, and has been introduced to Saint Helena. It is a close wild relative of the important forage crop Trifolium repens (white clover).

== Subtaxa ==
The following varieties are accepted:

- Trifolium semipilosum var. brunellii Thulin – Ethiopia
- Trifolium semipilosum var. glabrescens J.B.Gillett – Ethiopia, Kenya, Uganda, Tanzania, Malawi and Zimbabwe
- Trifolium semipilosum var. intermedium Thulin – Ethiopia
- Trifolium semipilosum var. semipilosum - Yemen, Eritrea, Ethiopia, Kenya, Uganda, Tanzania and Malawi, and introduced to Zimbabwe and Saint Helena
