= Kathryn Ayscough =

Professor of Molecular Cell Biology

- Born: Kathryn Rachel Ayscough
- Education: University of Oxford (BA); University College London (PhD)
- Scientific career
- Workplaces: University of California, Berkeley; University of Dundee; University of Glasgow; University of Sheffield
- Thesis: Morphological analysis of the Golgi apparatus in Schizosaccharomyces pombe (1993)
- Website: www.sheffield.ac.uk/bms/research/ayscough

Kathryn Rachel Ayscough is a professor of molecular cell biology and head of the department of biomedical science at the University of Sheffield. She was awarded the 2002 Society for Experimental Biology President's Medal. Her research investigates the role of the actin cytoskeleton in membrane trafficking and cell organisation.

== Early life and education ==
Ayscough attended a comprehensive school near Bristol and studied biochemistry at the University of Oxford where she was a student at Exeter College, Oxford. She moved to the Imperial Cancer Research Fund and University College London for her doctoral degree, where she worked on the Golgi apparatus in Schizosaccharomyces pombe under the supervision of Graham Warren.

== Research and career ==
After her PhD, Ayscough moved to the University of California, Berkeley as a Wellcome Trust research fellow, working with David Drubin.

Ayscough moved to the University of Dundee as a Wellcome Trust Development Fellow. She was appointed a Medical Research Council fellow at the University of Glasgow in 1999. In 2002 she was awarded the Society for Experimental Biology President's Medal. Ayscough joined the Department of Molecular Biology and Biotechnology at the University of Sheffield in 2003 and was promoted to Professor in 2012. In 2016 Ayscough was appointed the Head of Biomedical Science at the University of Sheffield. She is a member of the Faculty of 1000 and has been funded by the Biotechnology and Biological Sciences Research Council (BBSRC).

Her research considers the mechanisms that control cell organisation. In particular, she looks at how actin (an element of the cytoskeleton) can initiate the formation of filaments, which permit inward bending of the plasma membrane. Invagination, the inward bending process of the plasma membrane, is known as endocytosis, and ensures that cells can regulate the composition of their surface to respond to environmental signals. She has explored how dynamin, amphiphysin and actin work together during the formation of cell membranes. Ayscough has also studied how endocytosis and cell shape relate to the invasion and survival of Candida albicans.

Alongside her research, Ayscough has worked on initiatives to promote equality and diversity including Athena SWAN.

=== Selected publications ===
Her publications include:

- High rates of actin filament turnover in budding yeast and roles for actin in establishment and maintenance of cell polarity revealed using the actin inhibitor latrunculin-A
- Latrunculin alters the actin-monomer subunit interface to prevent polymerization
- Actin-binding proteins

She has written for The Conversation.
