= PLD3 =

Protein-coding gene in the species Homo sapiens

Identifiers
- Aliases: PLD3, AD19, HU-K4, HUK4, phospholipase D family member 3, SCA46
- External IDs: OMIM: 615698; MGI: 1333782; GeneCards: PLD3
Enzyme activity
EC #	BRENDA	ExPASy	KEGG	MetaCyc
3.1.16.1	↗	↗	↗	↗

Gene location (Human)
Chr.	Chromosome 19 (human)
Band	19q13.2	Start	40,348,456 bp
Band	19q13.2	End	40,380,439 bp

Gene location (Mouse)
Chr.	Chromosome 7 (mouse)
Band	7|7 A3	Start	27,231,425 bp
Band	7|7 A3	End	27,252,643 bp
RNA expression pattern
Bgee	Human / Mouse (ortholog); Top expressed in: anterior pituitary; right frontal lobe; stromal cell of endometrium; prefrontal cortex; right ovary; Descending thoracic aorta; right coronary artery; left ovary; ascending aorta; nucleus accumbens / Top expressed in: dentate gyrus of hippocampal formation granule cell; superior frontal gyrus; primary visual cortex; perirhinal cortex; entorhinal cortex; dorsomedial hypothalamic nucleus; prefrontal cortex; stroma of bone marrow; arcuate nucleus; ventromedial nucleus; More reference expression data
BioGPS	n/a
Gene ontology
Molecular function	phospholipase D activity; N-acylphosphatidylethanolamine-specific phospholipase D activity; protein binding; catalytic activity; hydrolase activity
Cellular component	integral component of membrane; extracellular exosome; endoplasmic reticulum membrane; endoplasmic reticulum; membrane
Biological process	lipid catabolic process; lipid metabolism
Sources:Amigo / QuickGO
Orthologs
Databases	NCBI: entry; OMA: entry
Species	Human	Mouse
Entrez	23646	18807
Ensembl	ENSG00000105223	ENSMUSG00000003363
UniProt	Q8IV08	O35405
RefSeq (mRNA)	NM_001031696; NM_001291311; NM_012268	NM_011116; NM_001317355
RefSeq (protein)	NP_001026866; NP_001278240; NP_036400	NP_001304284; NP_035246
Location (UCSC)	Chr 19: 40.35 – 40.38 Mb	Chr 7: 27.23 – 27.25 Mb
PubMed search
- Wikidata
View/Edit Human	View/Edit Mouse

Phospholipase D3, also known as PLD3, is a protein that in humans is encoded by the PLD3 gene. PLD3 belongs to the phospholipase D superfamily because it contains the two HKD motifs common to members of the phospholipase D family, however, it has no known catalytic function similar to PLD1 or PLD2. PLD3 serves as a ssDNA 5' exonuclease in antigen presenting cells. PLD3 is highly expressed in the brain in both humans and mice, and is mainly localized in the endoplasmic reticulum (ER) and the lysosome.

PLD3 may play a role in regulating the lysosomal system, myogenesis, late-stage neurogenesis, inhibiting insulin signal transduction, and amyloid precursor protein (APP) processing. The involvement in PLD3 in the lysosomal system and in APP processing and the loss-of-function mutations in PLD3 are thought to be linked to late-onset Alzheimer's disease (LOAD). However, there are also studies that challenge the association between PLD3 and Alzheimer's disease (AD).

How APP processing is affected by PLD3 during AD still remains unclear, and its role in the pathogenesis of AD is ambiguous. PLD3 may contribute to the onset of AD by a mechanism other than by influencing APP metabolism, with one proposed mechanism suggesting that PLD3 contributes to the onset of AD by impairing the endosomal-lysosomal system. In 2017, PLD3 was shown to have an association with another neurodegenerative disease, spinocerebellar ataxia.

== Genetics ==
PLD3 was first characterized as a human homolog of the HindIII K4L protein in the vaccinia virus, having a DNA sequence 48.1% similar to the viral gene. The PLD3 gene in humans is located at chromosome 19q13.2, with a sequence comprising at least 15 exons and is alternatively spliced at the low GC 5' UTR into 25 predicted transcripts. Translation of the 490 amino acid-long PLD3 protein is initiated around exons 5 to 7, and ends at the stop codon in exon 15.

== Structure ==
PLD3 is a 490 amino acid-long type 2 transmembrane protein, unlike PLD1 and PLD2 which do not contain a transmembrane protein domain in their protein structure.

The cytosolic N-terminal of the protein faces towards the cytoplasm of the cell, and lacks consensus sites for N-glycosylation. The N-terminus is also predicted to contain a transmembrane domain.

The bulk of the protein is located in the ER lumen, containing the C-terminal domain. The C-terminal domain contains seven glycosylation sites along with a prenylation motif and two HXKXXXXD/E (HKD) motifs. In PLD1 and PLD2, this is the catalytic domain or active site of the protein, which is why PLD3 was assigned to the phospholipase D superfamily. However, PLD3 has no known catalytic activity and aside from presence of the HKD motifs, PLD3 has no structural commonalities with PLD1 or PLD2.

== Tissue and subcellular distribution ==
Expression of PLD3 in tissues differs with the transcript size of its mRNA. The longer 2200 base pair transcript is ubiquitously expressed in the body, exhibiting higher expression levels in the heart, skeletal muscle, and the brain. Meanwhile, the shorter 1700 base pair transcript is found in abundance in the brain, but at low expression in non-nervous tissue. PLD3 expression is especially pronounced in mature neurons in the mammalian forebrain. High expression of PLD3 is specifically seen in the hippocampus and the frontal, temporal, and occipital lobes in the cerebral cortex. The PLD3 gene is also found with high expression in the cerebellum.

Subcellular localization of PLD3 is thought to primarily be in the endoplasmic reticulum (ER), as it has been shown to co-localize with protein disulfide-isomerase, a protein known to be a marker for the ER. PLD3 may also be localized in lysosomes, co-localizing with lysosomal markers LAMP1 and LAMP2 in lysosomes in separate studies. PLD3 was identified as a protein in insulin secretory granules derived from pancreatic beta cells.

== Function ==
PLD3 is a member of the phospholipase D protein family, however, unlike phospholipase PLD1 and PLD2, it serves as a 5' exonuclease that specifically degrade ssDNA in the endolysosome, which is similar to the function of PLD4. Both PLD3 and PLD4 are essential for the clearance of nucleic acid product in antigen presenting cells. Deletion of PLD3 and PLD4 leads to accumulation of ssDNA and RNA in the endosome, which activates various nucleic acid sensors including TLR9, TLR7 and cGAS-STING and triggers inflammation and elevated secretion of cytokines. It is shown that mitochondrial DNA (mtDNA) is the major physiological substrate for PLD3 to degrade.

PLD3 may play some role in influencing protein processing through the lysosome as well as a regulatory role in lysosomal morphology. Some studies suggest that PLD3 is involved in amyloid precursor protein (APP) processing and regulating amyloid beta (Aβ) levels. Overexpression of wildtype PLD3 is linked to a decrease in intracellular APP and extracellular Aβ isoforms Aβ40 and Aβ42, while a knockdown of PLD3 is linked to an increase in extracellular Aβ40 and Aβ42. PLD3 was implied to be involved in sensing oxidative stress, such that suppressing the PLD3 gene with short hairpin RNA increased the viability of cells exposed to oxidative stress.

Increased PLD3 expression was shown to increase myotube formation in differentiated mouse myoblasts in vitro, and ER stress which also increases myotube formation was also shown to increase PLD3 expression. Decreasing PLD3 expression meanwhile decreases myotube formation. These findings suggest a possible role of PLD3 in myogenesis, although its exact mechanism of action remains unknown. Overexpression of PLD3 in mouse myoblasts in vitro may inhibit Akt phosphorylation and block signal transduction during insulin signalling. PLD3 may be involved in the later stages of neurogenesis, contributing to processes associated with neurotransmission, target cell innervation, and neuronal survival.

Elevated expression of PLD3 was found to be one of the consistent factors that contribute to the self-renewal activity of hematopoietic stem cell populations, suggesting a possible role of PLD3 in the mechanism behind the maintenance of durable, long-term self-renewing cell populations.

== Interactions ==
The human progranulin protein (PGRN), encoded by the human granulin gene (GRN), is co-expressed with and interacts with PLD3 accumulated on neuritic plaques in AD brains. PLD3 may interact with APP and amyloid beta, as some studies indicate that PLD3 is involved with APP processing and regulating Aβ levels. PLD3 may also interact with Akt and insulin in myoblasts in vitro.

== Clinical significance ==
=== Alzheimer's disease ===
Mutations in PLD3 have been studied for their potential role in the pathogenesis of late-onset Alzheimer's disease (LOAD).

In 2013, Cruchaga et al. found that a particular rare coding variant or missense mutation in PLD3 (Val232Met) doubled the risk for Alzheimer's disease among cases and controls of European and African-American descent. PLD3 mRNA and protein expression was reduced in AD brains compared with non-AD brains in regions that PLD3 is normally found with high expression, and another study also found that PLD3 accumulates on neuritic plaques in AD brains. A common PLD3 single nucleotide polymorphism (SNP) was also found to have an association with Aβ pathology among normal, healthy individuals, suggesting that common PLD3 variants may also be involved in the pathogenesis of AD. A meta-analysis conducted in 2015 concluded that the Val232Met PLD3 variant has a modest effect on increasing AD risk.

However, the findings from Cruchaga et al. could not be replicated in follow-up studies on the role of PLD3 in both familial and non-familial, sporadic Alzheimer's disease in Western population samples. The Val232Met PLD3 mutant was also not identified in a sample of AD patients and healthy control subjects from mainland China, suggesting that this particular PLD3 mutant may not significantly affect AD risk in the mainland Chinese population. A study showed that while there is an excess of PLD3 variants in LOAD, none of the variants described by Cruchaga et al. drive the association between PLD3 and LOAD in a European cohort, including the Val232Met variant. This study along with an additional study also demonstrated that these rare coding variants of PLD3 were not observed in early-onset AD (EOAD) in a European cohort, suggesting that PLD3 may not have a role in EOAD.

The underlying mechanisms on how mutations in PLD3 affects APP processing in AD remains unclear. Results from the study by Cruchaga et al. indicated that PLD3 loss-of-function increases risk for Alzheimer's disease by affecting APP processing. The involvement of PLD3 in APP processing was challenged in a recent study which showed that a PLD3 loss-of-function does not significantly affect the burden of amyloid plaques on AD development in mice. PLD3 loss-of-function in this study did, however, change the morphology of the lysosomal system in neurons, indicating that PLD3 loss-of-function may still be involved in the pathophysiology of AD through some other mechanism such as by contributing to the impairment of the endosomal-lysosomal system that occurs during AD.

=== Spinocerebellar ataxia ===
In 2017, the PLD3 gene was identified as one of the novel genes linked to spinocerebellar ataxia, another neurodegenerative genetic disease.
