= PLD2 =

Protein-coding gene in humans

Identifiers
- Aliases: PLD2, phospholipase D2, PLD1C
- External IDs: OMIM: 602384; MGI: 892877; GeneCards: PLD2
Enzyme activity
EC #	BRENDA	ExPASy	KEGG	MetaCyc
3.1.4.4	↗	↗	↗	↗

Gene location (Human)
Chr.	Chromosome 17 (human)
Band	17p13.2	Start	4,807,152 bp
Band	17p13.2	End	4,823,434 bp

Gene location (Mouse)
Chr.	Chromosome 11 (mouse)
Band	11 B3|11 42.99 cM	Start	70,430,890 bp
Band	11 B3|11 42.99 cM	End	70,448,936 bp
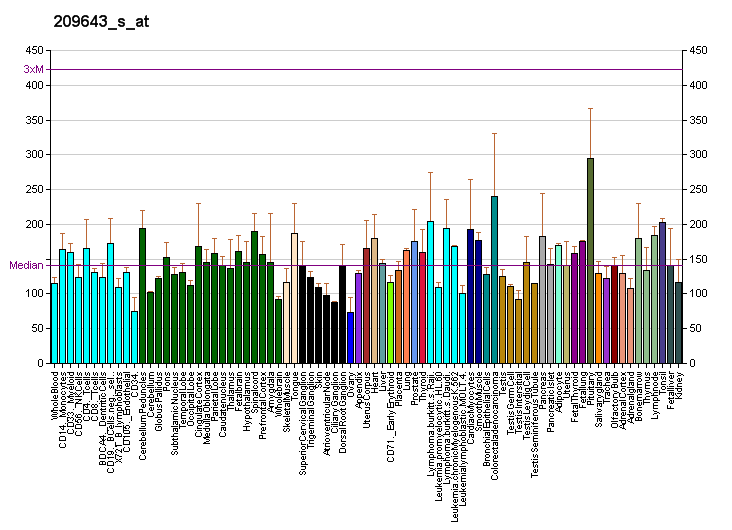
RNA expression pattern
Bgee	Human / Mouse (ortholog); Top expressed in: skin of leg; right hemisphere of cerebellum; ectocervix; right ovary; skin of abdomen; minor salivary glands; left ovary; tibial nerve; apex of heart; ventricular zone / Top expressed in: lip; esophagus; zygote; secondary oocyte; ankle; primary oocyte; vestibular membrane of cochlear duct; choroid plexus of fourth ventricle; dentate gyrus of hippocampal formation granule cell; skeletal muscle tissue; More reference expression data
BioGPS	More reference expression data
Gene ontology
Molecular function	phospholipase D activity; N-acylphosphatidylethanolamine-specific phospholipase D activity; protein binding; catalytic activity; phosphatidylinositol binding; hydrolase activity
Cellular component	Golgi apparatus; endoplasmic reticulum membrane; membrane; plasma membrane; presynapse
Biological process	Fc-gamma receptor signaling pathway involved in phagocytosis; lipid metabolism; cell motility; small GTPase mediated signal transduction; lipid catabolic process; synaptic vesicle recycling; cytoskeleton organization; phosphatidic acid biosynthetic process; inositol lipid-mediated signaling
Sources:Amigo / QuickGO
Orthologs
Databases	NCBI: entry; OMA: entry
Species	Human	Mouse
Entrez	5338	18806
Ensembl	ENSG00000129219	ENSMUSG00000020828
UniProt	O14939	P97813
RefSeq (mRNA)	NM_001243108; NM_002663	NM_008876; NM_001302475; NM_001302476; NM_001361935
RefSeq (protein)	NP_001230037; NP_002654	NP_001289404; NP_001289405; NP_032902; NP_001348864
Location (UCSC)	Chr 17: 4.81 – 4.82 Mb	Chr 11: 70.43 – 70.45 Mb
PubMed search
- Wikidata
View/Edit Human	View/Edit Mouse

Phospholipase D2 is an enzyme that in humans is encoded by the PLD2 gene.

== Function ==
Phosphatidylcholine (PC)-specific phospholipases D (PLDs) catalyze the hydrolysis of PC to produce phosphatidic acid and choline. Activation of PC-specific PLDs occurs as a consequence of agonist stimulation of both tyrosine kinase and G protein-coupled receptors. PC-specific PLDs have been proposed to function in regulated secretion, cytoskeletal reorganization, transcriptional regulation, and cell cycle control.[supplied by OMIM]

== Mechanism of activation ==
PLD2 is activated by substrate presentation. The enzyme is palmitoylated, which drives PLD2 to lipid rafts. PC substrate is polyunsaturated and resides in the membrane separately from lipid rafts near phosphatidylinositol 4,5-bisphosphate (PIP_{2}). When PIP_{2} levels increase, PLD2 trafficks to PIP_{2} where it encounters its substrate PC. Scaffolding proteins that interact with PLD2 likely changes its preference of lipid rafts vs PIP_{2}.

== Interactions ==
PLD2 has been shown to interact with:

- ARF1,
- Aldolase A,
- Amphiphysin,
- BIN1,
- Caveolin 1,
- Glyceraldehyde 3-phosphate dehydrogenase,
- PLCG1,
- PRKCD,
- Src, and
- Wiskott–Aldrich syndrome protein.

== Inhibitors ==
- N-(2-(1-(3-fluorophenyl)-4-oxo-1,3,8-triazaspiro[4.5]decan-8-yl)ethyl)-2-naphthamide: 75-fold selective versus PLD1, IC_{50} = 20 nM.
