= PLD4 =

Enzyme found in Homo sapiens

Identifiers
- Aliases: PLD4, C14orf175, phospholipase D family member 4
- External IDs: OMIM: 618488; MGI: 2144765; GeneCards: PLD4
Enzyme activity
EC #	BRENDA	ExPASy	KEGG	MetaCyc
3.1.16.1	↗	↗	↗	↗

Gene location (Human)
Chr.	Chromosome 14 (human)
Band	14q32.33	Start	104,924,713 bp
Band	14q32.33	End	104,937,761 bp

Gene location (Mouse)
Chr.	Chromosome 12 (mouse)
Band	12|12 F1	Start	112,727,089 bp
Band	12|12 F1	End	112,735,424 bp
RNA expression pattern
Bgee	Human / Mouse (ortholog); Top expressed in: granulocyte; monocyte; C1 segment; bone marrow cell; testicle; spleen; substantia nigra; appendix; right hemisphere of cerebellum; hypothalamus / Top expressed in: spleen; white matter of cerebellum; bone marrow; granulocyte; zone of skin; white adipose tissue; thymus; lung; jejunum; ileum; More reference expression data
BioGPS	n/a
Gene ontology
Molecular function	phospholipase D activity; N-acylphosphatidylethanolamine-specific phospholipase D activity; catalytic activity; hydrolase activity; phosphatidylinositol phospholipase C activity
Cellular component	integral component of membrane; endoplasmic reticulum membrane; membrane; nucleus; endoplasmic reticulum; trans-Golgi network membrane; phagocytic vesicle
Biological process	lipid catabolic process; inositol phosphate metabolic process; lipid metabolism; hematopoietic progenitor cell differentiation; phagocytosis
Sources:Amigo / QuickGO
Orthologs
Databases	NCBI: entry; OMA: entry
Species	Human	Mouse
Entrez	122618	104759
Ensembl	ENSG00000166428	ENSMUSG00000052160
UniProt	Q96BZ4	Q8BG07
RefSeq (mRNA)	NM_001308174; NM_138790	NM_178911
RefSeq (protein)	NP_001295103; NP_620145	NP_849242
Location (UCSC)	Chr 14: 104.92 – 104.94 Mb	Chr 12: 112.73 – 112.74 Mb
PubMed search
- Wikidata
View/Edit Human	View/Edit Mouse

Phospholipase D family member 4 is an enzyme that in humans is encoded by the PLD4 gene.

== Tissue distribution ==
PLD4 is expressed in immune cells such as B cells, macrophages and especially dendritic cells. A subtype of dendritic cells known as the plasmacytoid dendritic cells (pDC) has the highest expression of PLD4, among its top 10 most abundant transcripts.

== Structure ==
PLD4 is a type II transmembrane protein, with its short N-terminal domain inside the cytoplasm, and catalytic C-terminus outside the plasma membrane. Structurally, the extracellular domain of PLD4 protein has two HKD motifs, forming its catalytic center. In crystal structure, two PLD4 proteins form a homodimer.

== Function ==
Unlike other canonical members of the PLD family, PLD4 does not demonstrate phospholipase activity. Instead, PLD4 is known as an exonuclease that digests short ssDNA or ssRNA products in a 5' to 3' manner. The optimum pH for PLD4 to digest single stranded nucleic acid substrate is around 4.4 to 4.8, which coincides with its acidic late-endosomal / lysosomal subcellular location. Besides, it is also reported that PLD4, together with PLD3, participate in the synthesis of S,S-BMP, a phospholipid that is required for the degradation of lipids in lysosome. As an endolysosomal protein, PLD4 along with PLD3 digest nucleic acid product inside the lysosome of phagocytes to modulate the activity of nucleic acid sensors such as TLR9, TLR7 etc.

== Clinical sigfnicance ==
Genetic studies have associate PLD4 with several autoimmune diseases, such as SLE, rheumatoid arthritis and systemic sclerosis. Loss-of-function mutations in PLD4 are reported to trigger overactivation of the immune system by type I interferon pathways and SLE in both mouse model and human patients, and zinc deficiency-like syndrome in cattle.
