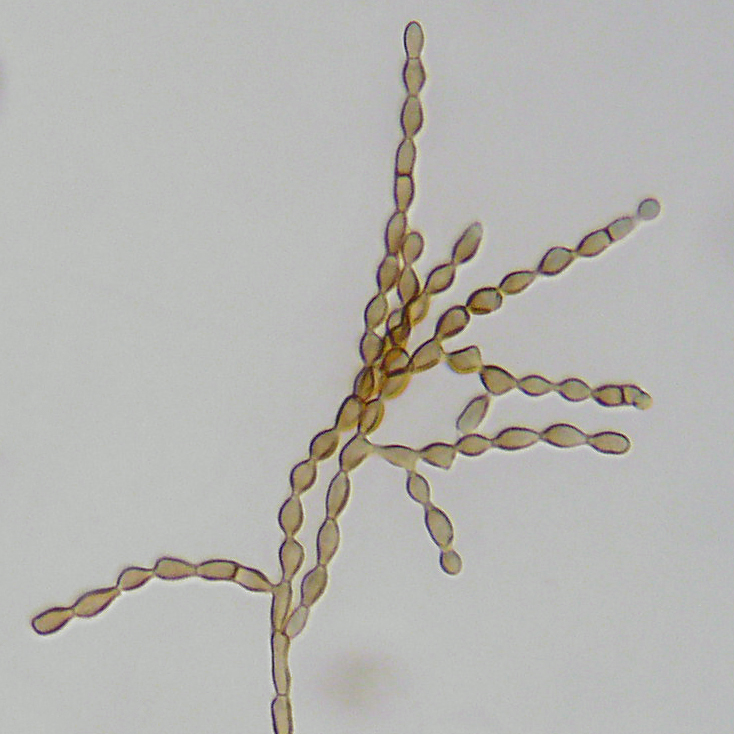

Scientific classification
- Kingdom: Fungi
- Division: Ascomycota
- Class: Dothideomycetes
- Order: Cladosporiales
- Family: Cladosporiaceae
- Genus: Cladosporium
- Species: C. cladosporioides

Binomial name
- Cladosporium cladosporioides (Fresen.) G.A.de Vries (1952)

Synonyms
- Cladosporium cladosporioides f. pisicola (W.C. Snyder) G.A. de Vries; Cladosporium hypophyllum Fuckel; Cladosporium pisicola W.C. Snyder; Hormodendrum cladosporioides (Fresen.) Sacc.; Monilia humicola Oudem.; Monilia humicola var. brunnea A.L. Sm; Penicillium cladosporioides Fresen.

= Cladosporium cladosporioides =

Species of fungus

Cladosporium cladosporioides is a darkly pigmented mold that occurs world-wide on a wide range of materials both outdoors and indoors.

It is known for its role in the decomposition of organic matter and its presence in indoor and outdoor environments. This species is also notable for its potential impact on human health, particularly in individuals with respiratory conditions.

It is one of the most common fungi in outdoor air where its spores are important in seasonal allergic disease. While this species rarely causes invasive disease in animals, it is an important agent of plant disease, attacking both the leaves and fruits of many plants. This species produces asexual spores in delicate, branched chains that break apart readily and drift in the air. It is able to grow under low water conditions and at very low temperatures.

== History and classification ==
Georg Fresenius first described Cladosporium cladosporioides in 1850, classifying it in the genus Penicillium as Penicillium cladosporioides. In 1880 Pier Andrea Saccardo renamed the species, Hormodendrum cladosporioides. Other early names for this taxon included Cladosporium hypophyllum, Monilia humicola and Cladosporium pisicola. In 1952 that Gerardus Albertus de Vries transferred the species to the genus Cladosporium where it remains today.

== Growth and morphology ==
Cladosporium cladosporioides reproduces asexually and because no teleomorph has been identified, it is considered an exclusively anamorphic species. Colonies are olive-green to olive-brown and appear velvety or powdery. On a potato dextrose agar (PDA) medium, colonies are olive-grey to dull green, velvety and tufted. The edges of the colony can be olive-grey to white, and feathery. The colonies are diffuse and the mycelia form mats and rarely grow upwards from the surface of the colony. On a malt extract agar (MEA) medium, colonies are olive-grey to olive or whitish due to the mycelia growing upwards, and seem velvety to tufted with olive-black or olive-brown edges. The mycelia can be diffuse to tufted and sometimes covers the whole colony. The mycelia appear felt-like, grows flat, and can be effused and furrowed. On oatmeal agar (OA) medium, colonies are olive-grey and there can be a gradient toward the edges of the colony from olive green to dull green, then olive-grey. The upward growth of mycelia can be sparse to abundant and tufted. The mycelia and can be loose to dense and tends to grow flat. Cladosporium cladosporioides has sparse, unbranched or rarely branched, darkly-pigmented hyphae that are typically not constricted at the septa. Mature conidiophores are treelike and comprise many long, branched chains of conidia. Cladosporium cladosporioides produces brown to olive-brown coloured, solitary conidiophores that branch irregularly, forming many ramifications. Each branch tends to be between 40–300 μm in length (exceptionally up to 350 μm) and 2–6 μm in width. The conidiophores are thin-walled and cylindrical and are formed at the end of ascending hyphae. The conidia are small, single-celled, lemon-shaped and smooth-walled. They form long, fragile chains up to 10 conidia in length with distinctive darkened connective tissue between each spore.

== Physiology ==
Cladosporium cladosporioides produces antifungal metabolites targeted toward plant pathogens. Three different compounds isolated from C. cladosporioides (cladosporin, isocladosporin and 5′-hydroxyasperentin), as well as a compound (5′,6-diacetyl cladosporin) synthesized from 5′-hydroxyasperentin have antifungal properties. As these compounds are effective against different types of fungi, C. cladosporioides is an important species for potential treatment and control of various plant-infecting fungi. The inoculation of Venturia inaequalis, a fungus that causes apple scab on apple tree leaves, with C. cladosporioides led to decreased conidial production in V. inaequalis. As this effect is seen both on younger and older leaves C. cladosporioides is effective in preventing and controlling infections of V. inaequalis in apple trees. This species also produces calphostins A, B, C, D and I, which are protein kinase C inhibitors. These calphostins have cytotoxic activity due to their ability to inhibit protein kinase C activity.

== Ecology ==
Cladosporium cladosporioides is a common saprotroph occurring as a secondary infection on decaying, or necrotic, parts of plants. This fungus is xerophilic – growing well in low water activity environments (e.g., a_{W} = 0.86–0.88). This species is also psychrophilic, it can grow at temperatures between −10 and −3 °C (14 and 27 °F). Cladosporium cladosporioides occurs outdoor environments year-round with peak spore concentration in the air occurring in summer where levels can range from 2,000 spores up to 50,000 spores per cubic meter of air. It is among the most common of all outdoor airborne fungi, colonizing plant materials and soil. It has been found in a number of crops, such as wheat, grapes, strawberries, peas and spinach. This species also grows in indoor environments, where it is often associated with the growth of fungi including species of Penicillium, Aspergillus versicolor and Wallemia sebi. Cladosporium cladosporioides grows well on wet building materials, paint, wallpaper and textiles, as well as on paper, pulp, frescos, tiles, wet window sills and other indoor substrates including salty and sugary foods. Due to its tolerance of lower temperatures, C. cladosporioides can grow on refrigerated foods and colonize moist surfaces in refrigerators.

== Role in disease ==
=== Plants ===
Cladosporium cladosporioides and C. herbarum cause Cladosporium rot of red wine grapevines. The incidence of infection is much higher when the harvest of the grapes is delayed. Over 50% of grape clusters can be affected at harvest, which greatly reduced the yield and affects the wine quality. This delay is required in order for the phenolic compounds in the grapes to ripen and contribute to the aroma and flavour development in wine of optimum quality. Symptoms of Cladosporium rot are typically observed on mature grapes and are characterized by dehydration, a small area of decay that is firm, and a layer of olive-green mould. Although leaf removal reduces the incidence of infection by many species of fungi, it leads to an increase in C. cladosporioides populations on grape clusters and an increase in rotten grapes at harvest. Removal of diseased leaves is therefore counter-indicated in the control of this fungus. The only recommendation made to avoid severe Cladosporium infections of grape clusters is to limit periods of continuous exposure to sunlight.

This species has also been involved in the rotting of strawberry blossoms. Infection of strawberry blossoms by C. cladosporioides has been associated with simultaneous infections by Xanthomonas fragariae (in California), and more recently C. tenuissimum (in Korea). C. cladosporioides infects the anthers, sepals, petals and pistils of the strawberry blossom and is typically observed on older flowers with dehisced anthers and signs of senescence. From 1997-2000, there was a higher proportion of misshapen fruits due to C. cladosporioides infection, and their culling affected the strawberry industry in California. Infection leads to necrosis of the entire flower, or parts of it, as well as to the production of small and misshapen fruits and green-grey sporulation on the stigma. A higher occurrence of infection is observed in strawberry plants cultivated outdoors than cultivated in a greenhouse.

=== Animals ===
Cladosporium cladosporioides rarely causes infections in humans, although superficial infections have been reported. It can occasionally cause pulmonary and cutaneous phaeohyphomycosis and it has been isolated from cerebrospinal fluid in an immunocompromised patient. This species can trigger asthmatic reactions due to the presence of allergens and beta-glucans on its spore surface. In mice, living C. cladosporioides spores have induced hyperresponsiveness of the lungs, as well as an increase in eosinophils, which are white blood cells typically associated with asthmatic and allergic reactions. Cladosporium cladosporioides can also induce respiratory inflammation due to the up-regulation of macrophage inflammatory protein (MIP)-2 and keratinocyte chemoattractant (KC), which are cytokines involved in the mediation of inflammation. A case of mycotic encephalitis and nephritis due to C. cladosporioides has been described in a dog, resulting in altered behaviour, depression, abnormal reflexes in all 4 limbs and loss of vision. Post-mortem examination indicated posterior brainstem and cerebellar lesions, confirming the causative involvement of the agent.
