= Phospholipase D1 =

Protein found in humans

PLD1

Identifiers
- Aliases: PLD1, phospholipase D1, CVDD
- External IDs: OMIM: 602382; MGI: 109585; GeneCards: PLD1
Enzyme activity
EC #	BRENDA	ExPASy	KEGG	MetaCyc
3.1.4.4	↗	↗	↗	↗

Gene location (Human)
Chr.	Chromosome 3 (human)
Band	3q26.31	Start	171,600,404 bp
Band	3q26.31	End	171,810,950 bp

Gene location (Mouse)
Chr.	Chromosome 3 (mouse)
Band	3 A3|3 11.15 cM	Start	27,992,844 bp
Band	3 A3|3 11.15 cM	End	28,187,511 bp
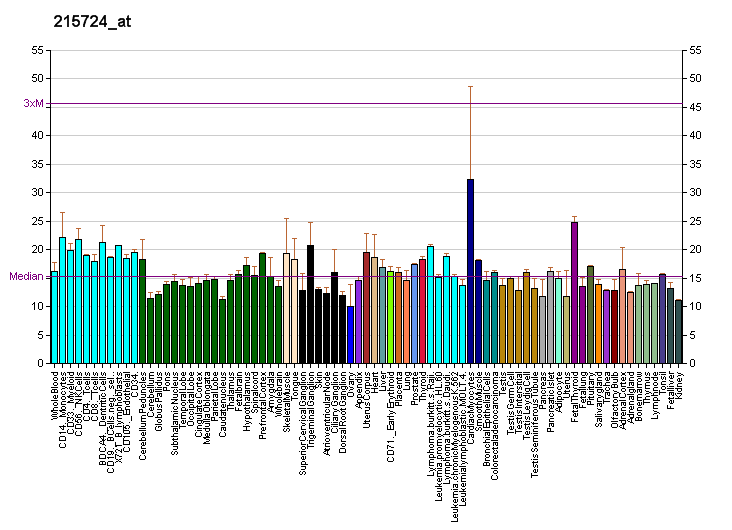

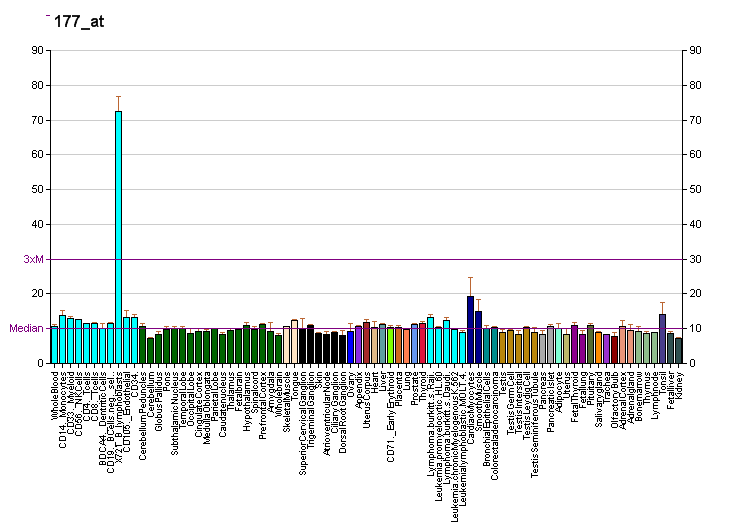

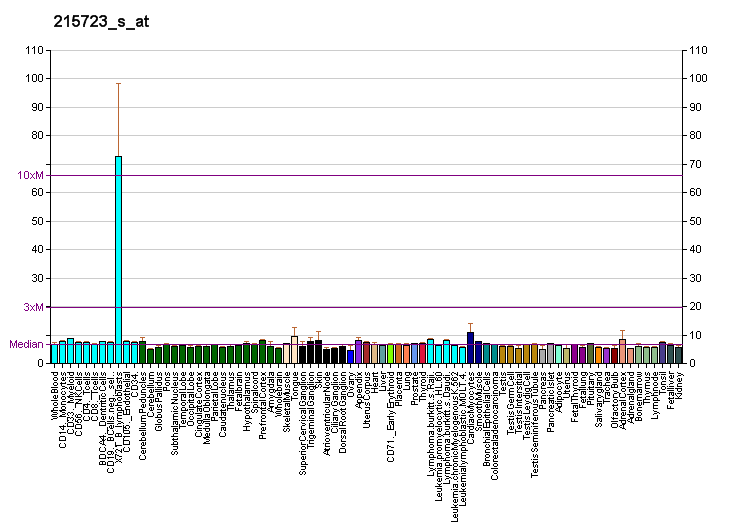
RNA expression pattern
Bgee	Human / Mouse (ortholog); Top expressed in: gallbladder; right adrenal cortex; mucosa of esophagus; duodenum; left adrenal gland; corpus callosum; left adrenal cortex; skin of abdomen; skin of leg; jejunal mucosa / Top expressed in: zygote; secondary oocyte; primary oocyte; crypt of lieberkuhn of small intestine; jejunum; ileum; left colon; vestibular membrane of cochlear duct; epithelium of lens; Paneth cell; More reference expression data
BioGPS	More reference expression data
Gene ontology
Molecular function	phospholipase D activity; N-acylphosphatidylethanolamine-specific phospholipase D activity; protein binding; catalytic activity; phosphatidylinositol binding; hydrolase activity
Cellular component	cytoplasm; late endosome membrane; Golgi membrane; endocytic vesicle; lysosomal membrane; apical plasma membrane; endoplasmic reticulum; perinuclear region of cytoplasm; endosome; endoplasmic reticulum membrane; membrane; Golgi apparatus; plasma membrane; specific granule membrane; tertiary granule membrane; cholinergic synapse
Biological process	regulation of microvillus assembly; lipid metabolism; cell motility; small GTPase mediated signal transduction; lipid catabolic process; chemotaxis; Ras protein signal transduction; neutrophil degranulation; phosphatidic acid biosynthetic process; inositol lipid-mediated signaling; regulation of synaptic vesicle cycle
Sources:Amigo / QuickGO
Orthologs
Databases	NCBI: entry; OMA: entry
Species	Human	Mouse
Entrez	5337	18805
Ensembl	ENSG00000075651	ENSMUSG00000027695
UniProt	Q13393	Q9Z280
RefSeq (mRNA)	NM_001130081; NM_002662	NM_001164056; NM_008875; NM_001368667
RefSeq (protein)	NP_001123553; NP_002653	n/a
Location (UCSC)	Chr 3: 171.6 – 171.81 Mb	Chr 3: 27.99 – 28.19 Mb
PubMed search
- Wikidata
View/Edit Human	View/Edit Mouse

Phospholipase D_{1} (PLD1) is an enzyme that in humans is encoded by the PLD1 gene, though analogues are found in plants, fungi, prokaryotes, and even viruses.

== History ==
The possibility of PLD1 was first mentioned in 1947 by authors Hanahan and Chaikoff at Berkeley when describing a carrot enzyme that could "[split] choline from phospholipids." PLD was first derived in mammals in 1975 by Saito and Kanfer, who noted its activity in rats. PLD was first cloned from HeLa cell cDNA in 1995, while mammalian PLD1 was first cloned from a rat in 1997.

== Function ==
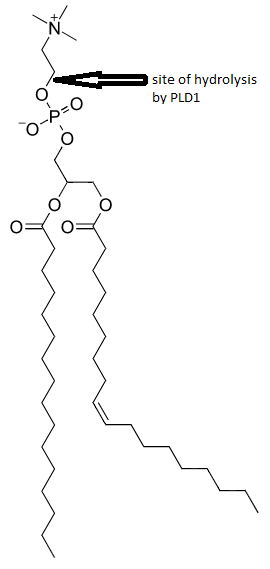
Site of hydrolysis on a phosphatidylcholine by PLD1

Phosphatidylcholine (PC)-specific phospholipases D (PLDs) EC 3.1.4.4 catalyze the hydrolysis of PC to produce phosphatidic acid (PA) and choline. A range of agonists acting through G protein-coupled receptors and receptor tyrosine kinases stimulate this hydrolysis. PC-specific PLD activity has been implicated in numerous cellular pathways, including membrane trafficking, signal transduction, platelet coagulation, mitosis, apoptosis, and the creation of cytoplasmic lipid droplets.

=== Membrane trafficking ===
PLD1 has been shown to associate at the plasma membrane, late endosome, early endosome, and the Golgi apparatus. There is evidence that PA is able to assist in negative membrane curvature due to its head group being smaller than in many other lipids. One experiment with PLD1 knockout showed a significant reduction in the number of exocytotic fusion events, implying a strong role in exocytosis.

=== Signal transduction ===
PLD1 may play a role in some cells in the endocytosis of signaling receptors or exocytosis of signaling molecules. For example, one experiment in B cells showed that limiting PLD1 led to significantly reduced endocytosis of the B cell receptor. Another experiment showed that knocking out PLD1 may hinder the ability of mice to secrete catecholamines, molecules that are essential for vesicular communication across the body.

== Structure ==
Mammalian PLD1 has several domains for activators, inhibitors, and catalysis, which it shares with PLD2. Domains for both activation and inhibition are referred to as the phox homology (PX) and pleckstrin homology (PH) domains. The catalytic domain consists of two HKD regions, so named for three of the amino acids that are key in catalysis. These domains are conserved across many organisms. There are two splice variants of the protein, PLD1a and PLD1b, but they do not seem to localize any differently.

== Applications ==
Alzheimer's disease: PA, which is produced in part by PLD1, seems to be involved in the movement of β-amyloid, which could precede amyloidogenesis.

Cancer: certain rat tumors with dominant negative PLD do not appear to form new colonies or tumors.

Thrombosis: PLD knockout mice appear to have reduced occlusion, thus offsetting thrombosis.

Type II Diabetes: the protein PED/PEA15 is often elevated in type II diabetic patients, thus enhancing PLD1 activity, and in turn impairing insulin.

== Interactions ==
Phospholipase D1 has been shown to interact with:

- Alpha-synuclein,
- Amphiphysin,
- BIN1,
- CDC42,
- PEA15,
- Protein kinase N1
- RALA, and
- RHOA.

== Inhibitors ==
- Calphostin-c, an inhibitor
- VU-0359595: 1,700-fold selective versus phospholipase D2, IC_{50} = 3.7nM.
