= Calphostin =

Class of fungi

The calphostins are a class of closely related chemical compounds isolated from the fungus Cladosporium cladosporioides. The known calphostins include calphostin A, calphostin B, calphostin C, calphostin D, and calphostin I. The calphostins are inhibitors of protein kinase C (PKC). The most potent member of the series, calphostin C, has found use as a biochemical tool because of this activity.

Calpohostin	R^{1}	R^{2}
Calphostin A	Bz	Bz
Calphostin B	Bz	H
Calphostin C	Bz	4-(HO)Bz
Calphostin D	H	H
Calphostin I	4-(HO)Bz	4-(HO)Bz

== Calphostin C ==
Calphostin C is a potent inhibitor of protein kinase C (PKC).
