= Calphostin C =

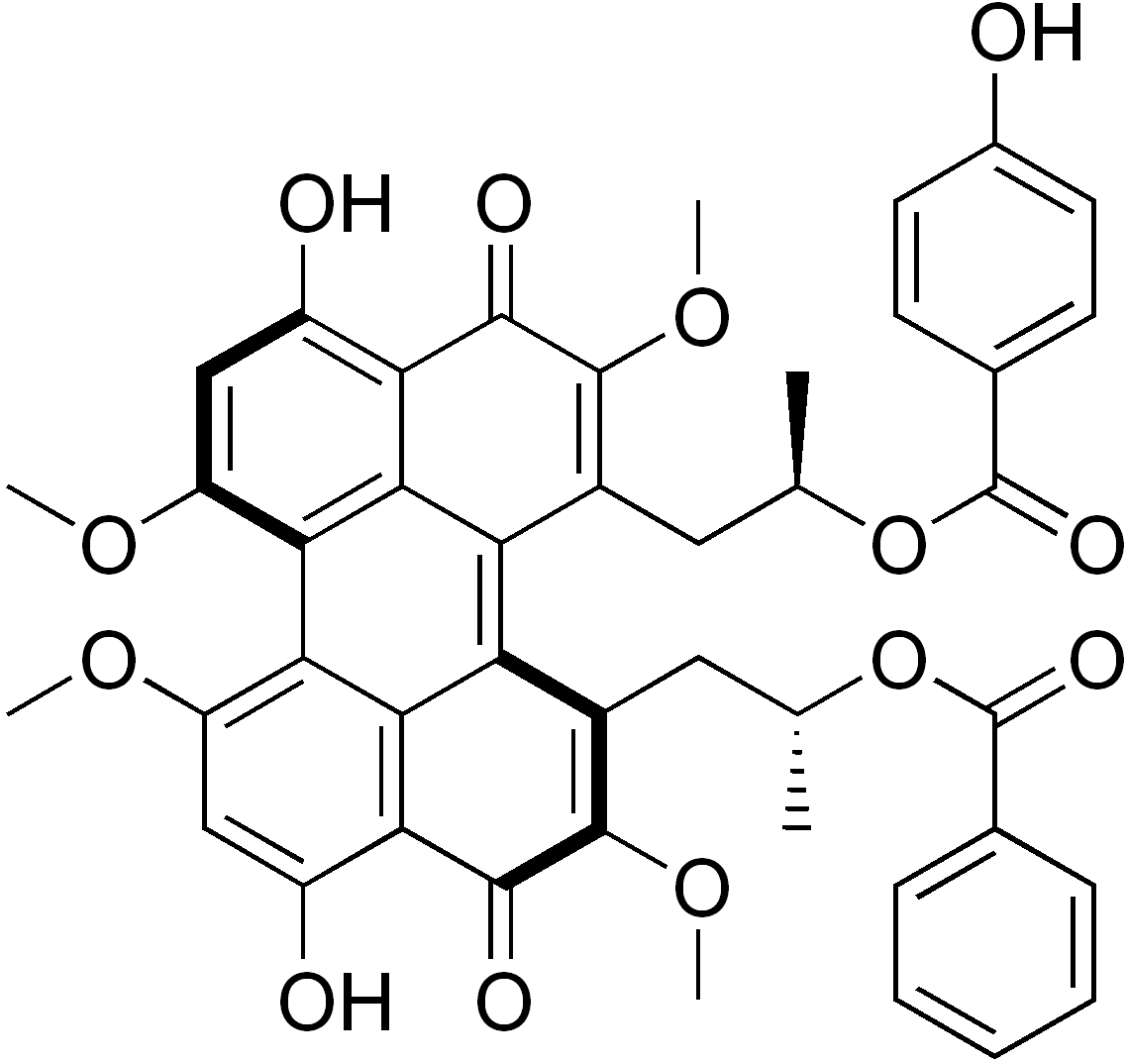

Names
- IUPAC name [(2R)-1-[3,10-dihydroxy-12-[(2R)-2-(4-hydroxyphenoxy)carbonyloxypropyl]-2,6,7,11-tetramethoxy-4,9-dioxoperylen-1-yl]propan-2-yl] benzoate

Identifiers
CAS Number	121263-19-2
3D model (JSmol)	Interactive image
ChEMBL	ChEMBL1256495
ChemSpider	9106020
IUPHAR/BPS	5156
PubChem CID	10930781
UNII	I271P23G24
CompTox Dashboard (EPA)	DTXSID40923744
- InChI: InChI=1S/C44H38O14/c1-20(56-43(50)22-10-8-7-9-11-22)16-25-31-32-26(17-21(2)57-44(51)58-24-14-12-23(45)13-15-24)42(55-6)40(49)34-28(47)19-30(53-4)36(38(32)34)35-29(52-3)18-27(46)33(37(31)35)39(48)41(25)54-5/h7-15,18-21,45,48-49H,16-17H2,1-6H3/t20-,21-/m1/s1 Key: LSUTUUOITDQYNO-NHCUHLMSSA-N; InChI=1/C44H38O14/c1-20(56-43(50)22-10-8-7-9-11-22)16-25-31-32-26(17-21(2)57-44(51)58-24-14-12-23(45)13-15-24)42(55-6)40(49)34-28(47)19-30(53-4)36(38(32)34)35-29(52-3)18-27(46)33(37(31)35)39(48)41(25)54-5/h7-15,18-21,45,48-49H,16-17H2,1-6H3/t20-,21-/m1/s1 Key: LSUTUUOITDQYNO-NHCUHLMSBH
- SMILES: C[C@H](CC1=C(C(=C2C(=O)C=C(C3=C4C(=CC(=O)C5=C(C(=C(C(=C45)C1=C32)C[C@@H](C)OC(=O)OC6=CC=C(C=C6)O)OC)O)OC)OC)O)OC)OC(=O)C7=CC=CC=C7

Properties
Chemical formula	C_{44}H_{38}O_{14}
Molar mass	790.774 g·mol^{−1}
Appearance	red to brown powder
log P	7.65
Acidity (pK_{a})	5.46
- Except where otherwise noted, data are given for materials in their standard state (at 25 °C [77 °F], 100 kPa). verify (what is ?) Infobox references

Calphostin C is a natural chemical compound. It is one of the calphostins, isolated from the fungus Cladosporium cladosporioides. Calphostin C is a potent inhibitor of protein kinase C (PKC).
