= Amphiphysin =

Protein-coding gene in the species Homo sapiens

AMPH
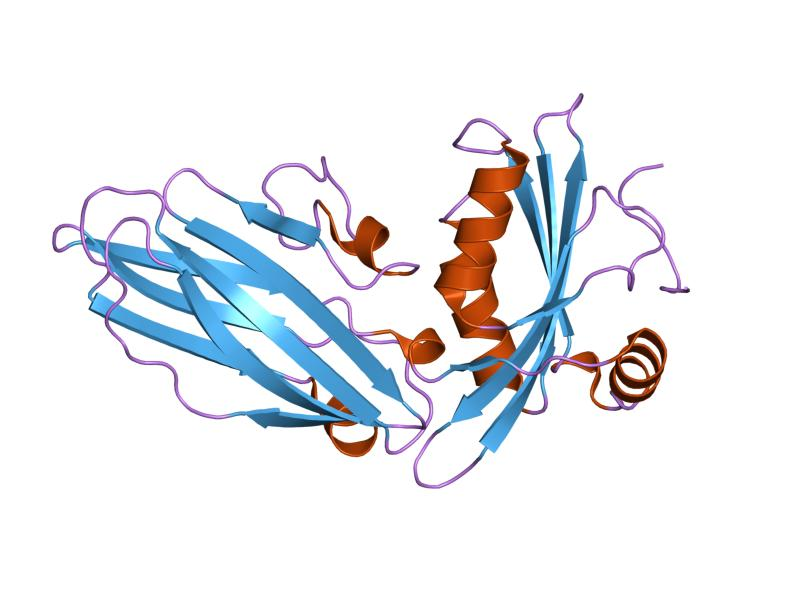

Identifiers
- Aliases: AMPH, AMPH1, amphiphysin
- External IDs: OMIM: 600418; MGI: 103574; GeneCards: AMPH
Available structures
PDB	Ortholog search: PDBe RCSB
PDB	List of PDB id codes 1KY7, 1UTC, 3SOG, 4ATM

Gene location (Human)
Chr.	Chromosome 7 (human)
Band	7p14.1	Start	38,383,704 bp
Band	7p14.1	End	38,631,420 bp

Gene location (Mouse)
Chr.	Chromosome 13 (mouse)
Band	13 A2|13 6.89 cM	Start	19,132,375 bp
Band	13 A2|13 6.89 cM	End	19,335,091 bp
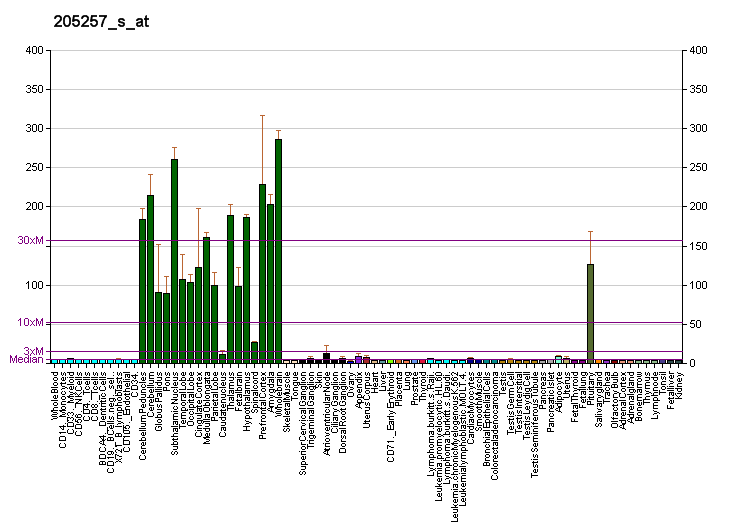
RNA expression pattern
Bgee	Human / Mouse (ortholog); Top expressed in: middle temporal gyrus; endothelial cell; frontal pole; paraflocculus of cerebellum; pons; Brodmann area 10; cerebellar vermis; orbitofrontal cortex; Brodmann area 46; superior frontal gyrus / Top expressed in: saccule; amygdala; otic vesicle; piriform cortex; barrel cortex; hippocampus proper; pontine nuclei; dentate gyrus; dentate gyrus of hippocampal formation granule cell; otic placode; More reference expression data
BioGPS	More reference expression data
Gene ontology
Molecular function	protein binding; phospholipid binding
Cellular component	actin cytoskeleton; cytoplasm; cell junction; synapse; synaptic vesicle membrane; cytoskeleton; membrane; cytoplasmic vesicle; synaptic vesicle; leading edge membrane; cytosol; plasma membrane
Biological process	endocytosis; chemical synaptic transmission; membrane organization; synaptic vesicle endocytosis
Sources:Amigo / QuickGO
Orthologs
Databases	NCBI: entry; OMA: entry
Species	Human	Mouse
Entrez	273	218038
Ensembl	ENSG00000078053	ENSMUSG00000021314
UniProt	P49418	Q7TQF7
RefSeq (mRNA)	NM_001635; NM_139316	NM_175007; NM_001289546
RefSeq (protein)	NP_001626; NP_647477	NP_001276475; NP_778172
Location (UCSC)	Chr 7: 38.38 – 38.63 Mb	Chr 13: 19.13 – 19.34 Mb
PubMed search
- Wikidata
View/Edit Human	View/Edit Mouse

Amphiphysin is a protein that in humans is encoded by the AMPH gene.

== Function ==
This gene encodes a protein associated with the cytoplasmic surface of synaptic vesicles. A subset of patients with stiff person syndrome who were also affected by breast cancer are positive for autoantibodies against this protein. Alternate splicing of this gene results in two transcript variants encoding different isoforms. Additional splice variants have been described, but their full length sequences have not been determined.

== Interactions ==
Amphiphysin has been shown to interact with DNM1, Phospholipase D1, CDK5R1, PLD2, CABIN1 and SH3GL2.

== See also ==
- Ap180 – Protein
- Epsin
