= Demographics of Korea =

Demographics of Korea refers to the demographic examination of Korea, a region in Northeast Asia.

Specific examinations include:

- Demographics of South Korea
- Demographics of North Korea

== See also ==
- Koreans, the Korean people, an East Asian ethnic group living in the Korean Peninsula
