= FAM47E-STBD1 =

Protein-coding gene in the species Homo sapiens

Identifiers
- Aliases: FAM47E-STBD1, FAM47E-STBD1 readthrough, FAM47E
- External IDs: GeneCards: FAM47E-STBD1; OMA:FAM47E-STBD1 - orthologs

Gene location (Human)
Chr.	Chromosome 4 (human)
Band	4q21.1	Start	76,251,721 bp
Band	4q21.1	End	76,311,129 bp
RNA expression pattern
Bgee	Human / Mouse (ortholog); Top expressed in: muscle of thigh; gastrocnemius muscle; islet of Langerhans; skeletal muscle tissue; liver; right lobe of liver; left ventricle; right auricle of heart; mucosa of transverse colon; apex of heart / n/a; More reference expression data
BioGPS	n/a
Gene ontology
Molecular function	molecular function
Cellular component	cytoplasm
Biological process	biological process
Sources:Amigo / QuickGO
Orthologs
Species	Human	Mouse
Entrez	100631383	n/a
Ensembl	ENSG00000272414	n/a
UniProt	Q6ZV65	n/a
RefSeq (mRNA)	NM_001242939	n/a
RefSeq (protein)	NP_001130042; NP_001229865; NP_001229868	n/a
Location (UCSC)	Chr 4: 76.25 – 76.31 Mb	n/a
PubMed search		n/a
- Wikidata
View/Edit Human

FAM47E-STBD1 readthrough is a protein that in humans is encoded by the FAM47E-STBD1 gene.

== Function ==
This locus represents naturally occurring read-through transcription between the neighboring FAM47E (family with sequence similarity 47, member E) and STBD1 (starch binding domain 1) genes on chromosome 4. The read-through transcript encodes a protein that shares sequence identity with the upstream gene product but its C-terminal region is distinct due to frameshifts relative to the downstream gene.
