= LRIG1 =

Protein-coding gene in the species Homo sapiens

Identifiers
- Aliases: LRIG1, LIG-1, LIG1, leucine-rich repeats and immunoglobulin like domains 1, leucine rich repeats and immunoglobulin like domains 1
- External IDs: OMIM: 608868; MGI: 107935; GeneCards: LRIG1
Available structures
PDB	Ortholog search: PDBe RCSB
PDB	List of PDB id codes 4U7L, 4U7M

Gene location (Human)
Chr.	Chromosome 3 (human)
Band	3p14.1	Start	66,378,797 bp
Band	3p14.1	End	66,501,263 bp

Gene location (Mouse)
Chr.	Chromosome 6 (mouse)
Band	6 D2|6 43.15 cM	Start	94,581,510 bp
Band	6 D2|6 43.15 cM	End	94,677,139 bp
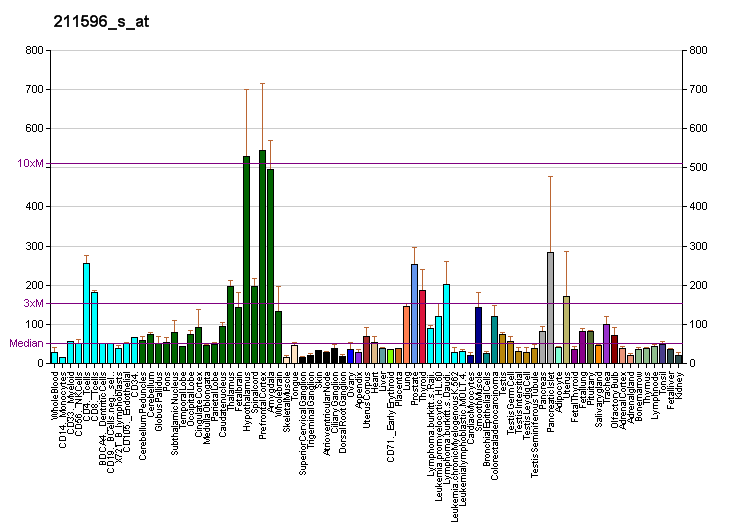
RNA expression pattern
Bgee	Human / Mouse (ortholog); Top expressed in: secondary oocyte; bronchial epithelial cell; ventricular zone; body of pancreas; cardia; gastric mucosa; muscle layer of sigmoid colon; pylorus; internal globus pallidus; lactiferous duct / Top expressed in: muscle of thigh; lip; ventricular zone; dentate gyrus of hippocampal formation granule cell; cerebellar cortex; zygote; secondary oocyte; superior frontal gyrus; tail of embryo; esophagus; More reference expression data
BioGPS	More reference expression data
Orthologs
Databases	NCBI: entry; OMA: entry
Species	Human	Mouse
Entrez	26018	16206
Ensembl	ENSG00000144749	ENSMUSG00000030029
UniProt	Q96JA1	P70193
RefSeq (mRNA)	NM_015541	NM_008377; NM_001355269
RefSeq (protein)	NP_056356; NP_001364273; NP_001364274; NP_001364275; NP_001364276 NP_001364277; NP_001364278	NP_032403; NP_001342198
Location (UCSC)	Chr 3: 66.38 – 66.5 Mb	Chr 6: 94.58 – 94.68 Mb
PubMed search
- Wikidata
View/Edit Human	View/Edit Mouse

Leucine-rich repeats and immunoglobulin-like domains protein 1 is a protein that in humans is encoded by the LRIG1 gene. It encodes a transmembrane protein that has been shown to interact with receptor tyrosine kinases of the EGFR family and with MET and RET.
