= PLD5 =

Protein-coding gene in humans

Identifiers
- Aliases: PLD5, PLDC, phospholipase D family member 5
- External IDs: MGI: 2442056; GeneCards: PLD5

Gene location (Human)
Chr.	Chromosome 1 (human)
Band	1q43	Start	242,082,986 bp
Band	1q43	End	242,524,697 bp

Gene location (Mouse)
Chr.	Chromosome 1 (mouse)
Band	1|1 H4	Start	175,789,872 bp
Band	1|1 H4	End	176,102,878 bp
RNA expression pattern
Bgee	Human / Mouse (ortholog); Top expressed in: retinal pigment epithelium; Descending thoracic aorta; ascending aorta; popliteal artery; tibial arteries; cerebellar cortex; cerebellar hemisphere; testicle; right hemisphere of cerebellum; endothelial cell / Top expressed in: cerebellar cortex; striatum of neuraxis; hypothalamus; muscle of thigh; superior frontal gyrus; muscle tissue; primary visual cortex; quadriceps femoris muscle; embryo; skeletal muscle tissue; More reference expression data
BioGPS	n/a
Orthologs
Databases	NCBI: entry; OMA: entry
Species	Human	Mouse
Entrez	200150	319455
Ensembl	ENSG00000180287	ENSMUSG00000055214
UniProt	Q8N7P1	Q3UNN8
RefSeq (mRNA)	NM_001195811; NM_001195812; NM_152666; NM_001320272; NM_001372062	NM_001195816; NM_176916; NM_001357844; NM_001357845; NM_001357846 NM_001357847
RefSeq (protein)	NP_001182740; NP_001182741; NP_001307201; NP_001358991	NP_001182745; NP_795890; NP_001344773; NP_001344774; NP_001344775 NP_001344776
Location (UCSC)	Chr 1: 242.08 – 242.52 Mb	Chr 1: 175.79 – 176.1 Mb
PubMed search
- Wikidata
View/Edit Human	View/Edit Mouse

Phospholipase D family, member 5 is a protein that in humans is encoded by the PLD5 gene.
