= LITATS1 =

Non-coding RNA in humans

Identifiers
- Aliases: LITATS1, long intergenic non-protein coding RNA 1137, ZC3H12A divergent transcript, LINC01137, ZC3H12A-DT, lncRNA induced by TGF-beta and antagonizes TGF-beta signaling 1
- External IDs: GeneCards: LITATS1

Gene location (Human)
Chr.	Chromosome 1 (human)
Band	1p34.3	Start	37,350,934 bp
Band	1p34.3	End	37,474,432 bp
RNA expression pattern
Bgee	Human / Mouse (ortholog); Top expressed in: right adrenal cortex; left adrenal cortex; right coronary artery; islet of Langerhans; ascending aorta; right lobe of liver; Descending thoracic aorta; skin of leg; skin of abdomen; gastrocnemius muscle / n/a; More reference expression data
BioGPS	n/a
Orthologs
Databases	NCBI: entry; OMA: entry
Species	Human	Mouse
Entrez	728431	n/a
Ensembl	ENSG00000233621	n/a
UniProt	n a	n/a
RefSeq (mRNA)	n/a	n/a
RefSeq (protein)	n/a	n/a
Location (UCSC)	Chr 1: 37.35 – 37.47 Mb	n/a
PubMed search		n/a
- Wikidata
View/Edit Human

lncRNA induced by TGF-beta and antagonizes TGF-beta signaling 1 is a non-coding RNA that in humans is encoded by the LITATS1 gene.
