= EXOC3L2 =

Identifiers
- Aliases: EXOC3L2, XTP7, exocyst complex component 3-like 2, exocyst complex component 3 like 2
- External IDs: OMIM: 616927; MGI: 1921713; GeneCards: EXOC3L2

Gene location (Human)
Chr.	Chromosome 19 (human)
Band	19q13.32	Start	45,212,370 bp
Band	19q13.32	End	45,245,407 bp

Gene location (Mouse)
Chr.	Chromosome 7 (mouse)
Band	7|7 A3	Start	19,197,256 bp
Band	7|7 A3	End	19,230,687 bp
RNA expression pattern
Bgee	Human / Mouse (ortholog); Top expressed in: oocyte; secondary oocyte; buccal mucosa cell; cardia; pars reticulata; renal medulla; lateral nuclear group of thalamus; vena cava; subthalamic nucleus; pylorus / Top expressed in: tunica albuginea of testis; right kidney; seminiferous tubule; adrenal gland; lumbar spinal ganglion; rete testis; human kidney; renal corpuscle; spermatocyte; islet of Langerhans; More reference expression data
BioGPS	n/a
Gene ontology
Molecular function	SNARE binding; molecular function
Cellular component	exocyst; cellular component
Biological process	exocyst localization; exocytosis; biological process
Sources:Amigo / QuickGO
Orthologs
Databases	NCBI: entry; OMA: entry
Species	Human	Mouse
Entrez	90332	74463
Ensembl	ENSG00000283632	ENSMUSG00000011263
UniProt	Q2M3D2	n/a
RefSeq (mRNA)	NM_138568; NM_001382422	NM_028954; NM_001370800
RefSeq (protein)	NP_001369351	n/a
Location (UCSC)	Chr 19: 45.21 – 45.25 Mb	Chr 7: 19.2 – 19.23 Mb
PubMed search
- Wikidata
View/Edit Human	View/Edit Mouse

Exocyst complex component 3-like 2 is a protein that in humans is encoded by the EXOC3L2 gene.

The EXOC3L2 protein has been shown to interact with EXOC4 that is a component of the exocyst complex involved exocytosis and more specifically in the targeting of exocytic vesicles to the cell membrane.

The exocyst complex is important for several biological processes, such as the establishment of cell polarity and regulation of cell migration. The structure and functions of the exocyst complex are conserved from yeast to higher eukaryotes. Endothelial cells in blood vessels express high levels of EXOC3L2 that is required for proper VEGFR-2 signaling so that the endothelial cells can migrate towards the growth factor VEGF-A.
