= Georg Fresenius =

German physician and botanist (1808–1866)

Johann Baptist Georg Wolfgang Fresenius (25 September 1808 – 1 December 1866) was a German medical doctor and botanist, known for his work in the field of phycology. He was a native of Frankfurt am Main.

He studied medicine at the Universities of Heidelberg, Würzburg and Giessen, earning his doctorate at the latter institution in 1829. Afterwards he settled in Frankfurt am Main, where he worked as a general practitioner of medicine while maintaining an active interest in botany.

As a student in Heidelberg and afterwards, he studied botany with his friend George Engelmann (1809-1884), who later became a renowned German-American botanist. From 1831 Fresenius was curator of the Senckenberg herbarium and a teacher at the Senckenberg Research Institute (Forschungsinstitut Senckenberg). With his student Anton de Bary (1831–1888), he conducted microscopic investigations of algae and fungi. He died in Frankfurt on 1 December 1866 at the age of 58.

The plant genus Fresenia from the family Asteraceae is named after him.

== Selected writings ==
- Grundriss der Botanik, zum Gebrauche bei seinen Vorlesungen, 1840 - Outline of botany, etc.
- Beiträge zur mykologie, 1850 - Contributions to mycology.
- Beiträge zur Kenntniss mikroskopischer Organismen, 1856 - Contributions to the understanding of microscopic organisms.
- Cordiaceae, Heliotropieae, Borragineae, 1857 - Cordiaceae, Heliotropioideae, Boraginaceae.
