= BIN1 =

Protein-coding gene in humans

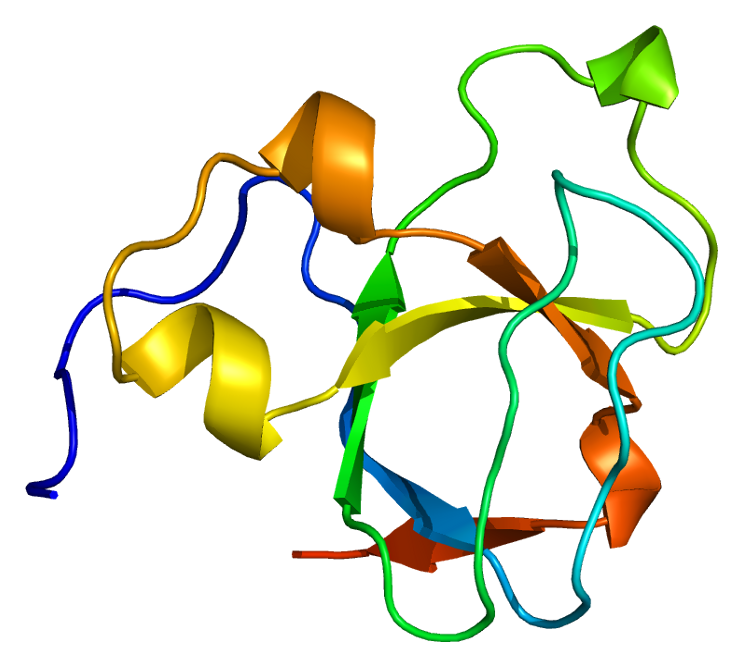

Identifiers
- Aliases: BIN1, AMPH2, AMPHL, SH3P9, bridging integrator 1, CNM2
- External IDs: OMIM: 601248; MGI: 108092; GeneCards: BIN1
Available structures
PDB	Ortholog search: PDBe RCSB
PDB	List of PDB id codes 1MUZ, 1MV0, 1MV3, 2FIC, 2RMY, 2RND, 5I22

Gene location (Human)
Chr.	Chromosome 2 (human)
Band	2q14.3	Start	127,048,027 bp
Band	2q14.3	End	127,107,288 bp

Gene location (Mouse)
Chr.	Chromosome 18 (mouse)
Band	18 B1|18 18.01 cM	Start	32,510,283 bp
Band	18 B1|18 18.01 cM	End	32,568,790 bp
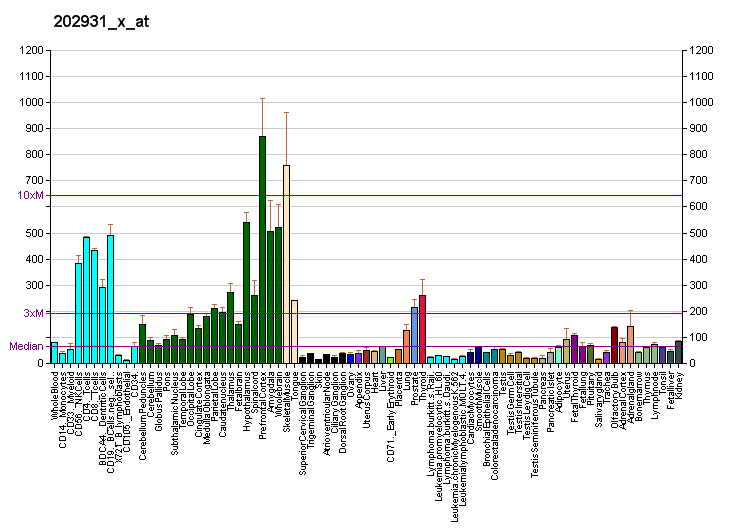

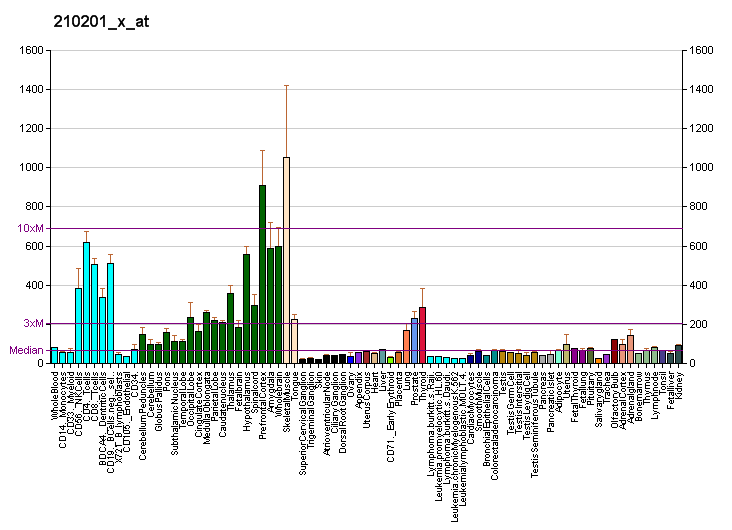

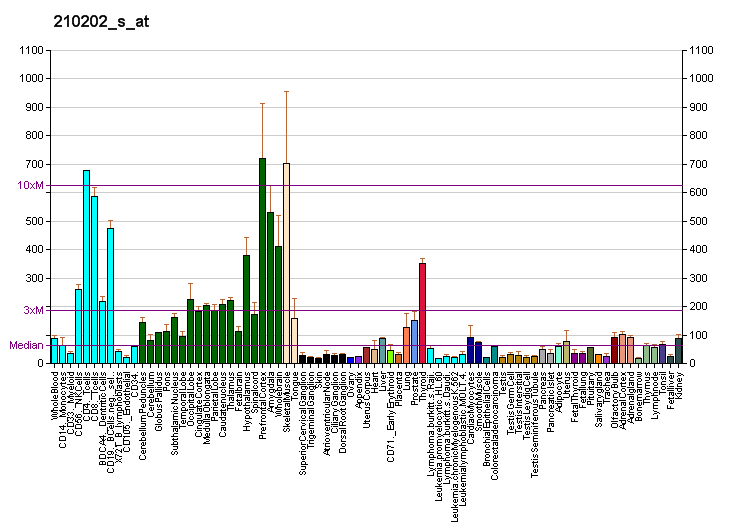
RNA expression pattern
Bgee	Human / Mouse (ortholog); Top expressed in: gastrocnemius muscle; muscle of thigh; Skeletal muscle tissue of rectus abdominis; tibialis anterior muscle; glutes; quadriceps femoris muscle; vastus lateralis muscle; triceps brachii muscle; thoracic diaphragm; deltoid muscle / Top expressed in: muscle of thigh; triceps brachii muscle; temporal muscle; extensor digitorum longus muscle; sternocleidomastoid muscle; plantaris muscle; medial head of gastrocnemius muscle; neural layer of retina; skeletal muscle tissue; digastric muscle; More reference expression data
BioGPS	More reference expression data
Gene ontology
Molecular function	protein binding; RNA polymerase binding; identical protein binding; tau protein binding; actin filament binding; protease binding; phospholipid binding; clathrin binding; chaperone binding
Cellular component	cytoplasm; membrane; I band; T-tubule; lipid tube; node of Ranvier; axon; Z discdkac; actin cytoskeleton; axon initial segment; nucleus; nuclear envelope; cytosol; endosome; cytoskeleton; plasma membrane; synaptic vesicle; sarcolemma; synapse
Biological process	regulation of endocytosis; regulation of neuron differentiation; cell differentiation; endocytosis; positive regulation of astrocyte differentiation; multicellular organism development; muscle cell differentiation; positive regulation of apoptotic process; lipid tube assembly; cell population proliferation; viral process; nucleus localization; nucleus organization; membrane organization; cytoskeleton organization; endosome to lysosome transport; positive regulation of actin filament polymerization; T-tubule organization; regulation of heart rate by cardiac conduction; negative regulation of potassium ion transmembrane transport; negative regulation of amyloid-beta formation; negative regulation of aspartic-type endopeptidase activity involved in amyloid precursor protein catabolic process; negative regulation of ventricular cardiac muscle cell action potential; negative regulation of calcium ion transmembrane transport via high voltage-gated calcium channel
Sources:Amigo / QuickGO
Orthologs
Databases	NCBI: entry; OMA: entry
Species	Human	Mouse
Entrez	274	30948
Ensembl	ENSG00000136717	ENSMUSG00000024381
UniProt	O00499	O08539
RefSeq (mRNA)	NM_004305; NM_139343; NM_139344; NM_139345; NM_139346 NM_139347; NM_139348; NM_139349; NM_139350; NM_139351; NM_001320632; NM_001320633; NM_001320634; NM_001320640; NM_001320641; NM_001320642	NM_001083334; NM_009668; NM_001360876
RefSeq (protein)	NP_001307561; NP_001307562; NP_001307563; NP_001307569; NP_001307570 NP_001307571; NP_004296; NP_647593; NP_647594; NP_647595; NP_647596; NP_647597; NP_647598; NP_647599; NP_647600; NP_647601; NP_647601.1; NP_001307561.1	NP_001076803; NP_033798; NP_001347805
Location (UCSC)	Chr 2: 127.05 – 127.11 Mb	Chr 18: 32.51 – 32.57 Mb
PubMed search
- Wikidata
View/Edit Human	View/Edit Mouse

Myc box‑dependent‑interacting protein 1 (BIN1), also known as bridging integrator 1 and amphiphysin‑2, is a protein that in humans is encoded by the BIN1 gene.

== Function ==
This gene encodes multiple isoforms of a membrane‑associated adaptor protein that can localize to the cytoplasm and, in some contexts, the nucleus. One isoform was originally identified as a MYC-interacting protein with characteristics of a tumor suppressor. BIN1 plays important roles in membrane curvature, endocytosis, and organization of specialized membrane structures such as transverse (T)‑tubules in striated muscle.

=== Nervous system ===
Isoforms expressed in the central nervous system participate in synaptic vesicle endocytosis and membrane trafficking through interactions with dynamin, endophilin, synaptojanin, and clathrin. Genetic variation at the BIN1 locus has been associated with risk of late‑onset Alzheimer's disease, and neuronal BIN1 isoforms interact with the microtubule‑associated protein tau.

=== Muscle and cellular functions ===
Muscle-specific and ubiquitously expressed isoforms are essential for the formation and maintenance of T-tubules and excitation–contraction coupling in skeletal and cardiac muscle. Certain nuclear-localized isoforms have been reported to modulate cell cycle progression and to induce an apoptotic or growth‑suppressive response independent of caspase activation in tumor cells.

=== Development and splicing ===
Studies in mice suggest that this gene plays an important role in cardiac muscle development and postnatal maturation of T-tubules. Alternative splicing of BIN1 generates numerous transcript variants encoding distinct isoforms with tissue‑specific expression patterns, and aberrant splice variants that attenuate BIN1 tumor-suppressor activity have been identified in several tumor cell lines and cancers.

== Clinical significance ==
In humans, mutations in BIN1 have been associated with skeletal myopathies including centronuclear myopathy causing muscle weakness and myotonic dystrophy causing progressive muscle wasting, myotonia, cataracts, and heart conduction defects. An association has also been found between BIN1 mutations and Alzheimer's disease. Knockdown of BIN1 produces a cardiomyopathy phenotype in zebrafish, and in sheep BIN1 may be responsible for the loss of T-tubules seen in heart failure.
