= RHO protein GDP dissociation inhibitor =

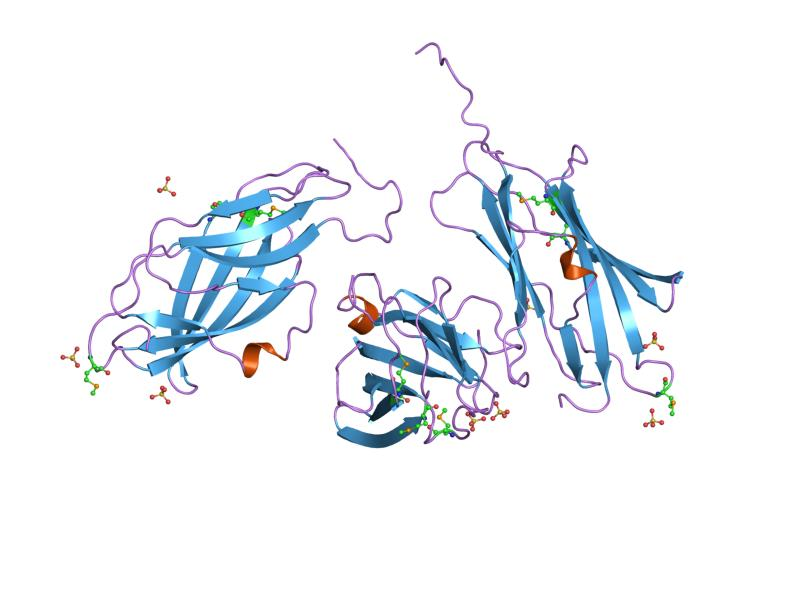
- Structure of RHO guanine nucleotide dissociation inhibitor.

Identifiers
- Symbol: Rho_GDI
- Pfam: PF02115
- InterPro: IPR000406
- SCOP2: 1rho / SCOPe / SUPFAM
- OPM superfamily: 91
- OPM protein: 1qvy
Available protein structures:
- PDB: IPR000406 PF02115 (ECOD; PDBsum)
- AlphaFold: IPR000406; PF02115

RHO protein GDP dissociation inhibitor of Rho proteins (rho GDI) regulates GDP/GTP exchange. The protein plays an important role in the activation of the oxygen superoxide-generating NADPH oxidase of phagocytes. This process requires the interaction of membrane-associated cytochrome b559 with 3 cytosolic components: p47-phox, p67-phox and a heterodimer of the small G-protein p21Rac1 and rho GDI. The association of p21rac and GDI inhibits dissociation of GDP from p21rac, thereby maintaining it in an inactive form. The proteins are attached via a lipid tail on p21rac that binds to the hydrophobic region of GDI. Dissociation of these proteins might be mediated by the release of lipids (e.g., arachidonate and phosphatidate) from membranes through the action of phospholipases. The lipids may then compete with the lipid tail on p21rac for the hydrophobic pocket on GDI.

== Human proteins containing this domain ==
ARHGDIA; ARHGDIB; ARHGDIG;
