= PAK1 =

Mammalian protein found in humans

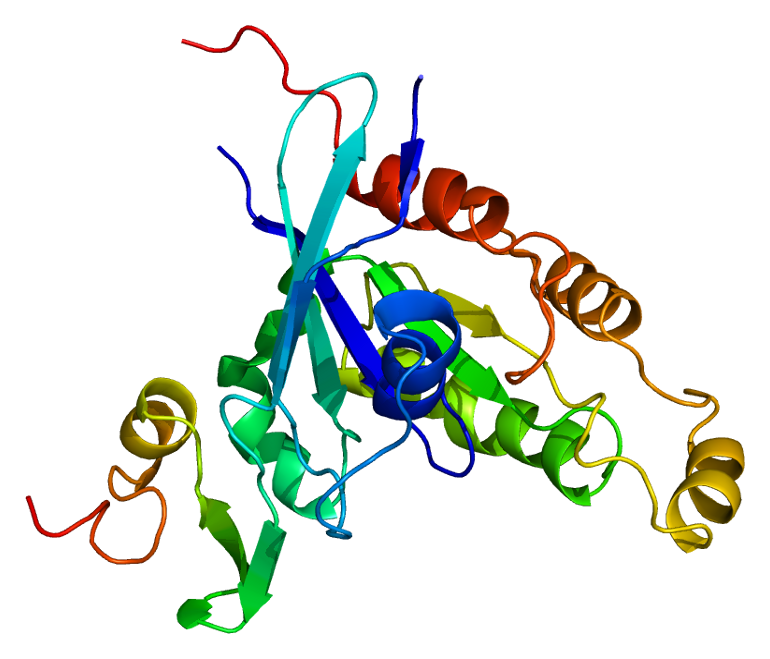

Identifiers
- Aliases: PAK1, PAKalpha, p21 (RAC1) activated kinase 1, IDDMSSD
- External IDs: OMIM: 602590; MGI: 1339975; GeneCards: PAK1
Available structures
PDB	Ortholog search: PDBe RCSB
PDB	List of PDB id codes 1F3M, 1YHW, 1ZSG, 2HY8, 2QME, 3DVP, 3FXZ, 3FY0, 3Q4Z, 3Q52, 3Q53, 4DAW, 4EQC, 4O0R, 4O0T, 4P90, 4ZJI, 4ZJJ, 4ZY4, 4ZY5, 4ZY6, 4ZLO, 5DFP, 5DEY, 5IME
Enzyme activity
EC #	BRENDA	ExPASy	KEGG	MetaCyc
2.7.11.1	↗	↗	↗	↗

Gene location (Human)
Chr.	Chromosome 11 (human)
Band	11q13.5-q14.1	Start	77,321,707 bp
Band	11q13.5-q14.1	End	77,474,635 bp

Gene location (Mouse)
Chr.	Chromosome 7 (mouse)
Band	7 E1|7 53.57 cM	Start	97,437,748 bp
Band	7 E1|7 53.57 cM	End	97,561,588 bp
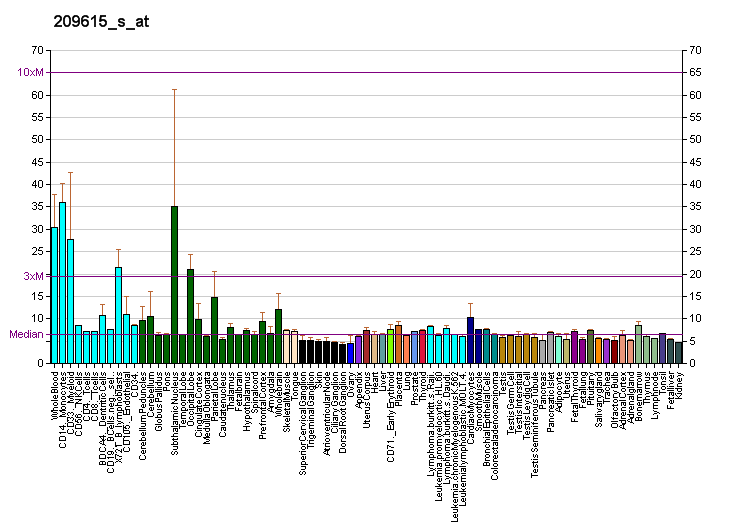
RNA expression pattern
Bgee	Human / Mouse (ortholog); Top expressed in: middle temporal gyrus; Brodmann area 23; monocyte; endothelial cell; pons; cerebellar cortex; cerebellar hemisphere; right hemisphere of cerebellum; right frontal lobe; lateral nuclear group of thalamus / Top expressed in: facial motor nucleus; motor neuron; pontine nuclei; zygote; anterior horn of spinal cord; inferior colliculi; piriform cortex; cerebellar cortex; genital tubercle; visual cortex; More reference expression data
BioGPS	More reference expression data
Gene ontology
Molecular function	ATP binding; collagen binding; protein binding; kinase activity; catalytic activity; nucleotide binding; transferase activity; protein serine/threonine kinase activity; protein kinase activity; identical protein binding; protein kinase binding
Cellular component	cell projection; ruffle membrane; membrane; filamentous actin; cell-cell junction; cell junction; focal adhesion; cytoplasm; intercalated disc; dendrite; plasma membrane; Z discdkac; axon; nuclear membrane; ruffle; cytosol; lamellipodium; protein-containing complex; actin filament; nucleoplasm; nucleus; chromosome
Biological process	positive regulation of protein phosphorylation; cellular response to insulin stimulus; negative regulation of cell proliferation involved in contact inhibition; response to hypoxia; exocytosis; positive regulation of JUN kinase activity; MAPK cascade; regulation of actin cytoskeleton organization; positive regulation of intracellular estrogen receptor signaling pathway; branching morphogenesis of an epithelial tube; ephrin receptor signaling pathway; positive regulation of stress fiber assembly; T cell costimulation; wound healing; positive regulation of cell migration; apoptotic process; Fc-gamma receptor signaling pathway involved in phagocytosis; Fc-epsilon receptor signaling pathway; phosphorylation; metabolism; stimulatory C-type lectin receptor signaling pathway; response to organic substance; T cell receptor signaling pathway; neuron projection morphogenesis; positive regulation of cell population proliferation; protein autophosphorylation; actin cytoskeleton reorganization; protein phosphorylation; Rho protein signal transduction; regulation of mitotic cell cycle; positive regulation of fibroblast migration; cerebellum development; establishment of cell polarity; positive regulation of microtubule polymerization; activation of protein kinase activity; positive regulation of peptidyl-serine phosphorylation; regulation of apoptotic process; positive regulation of axon extension; hepatocyte growth factor receptor signaling pathway; regulation of axonogenesis; negative regulation of cell growth involved in cardiac muscle cell development; positive regulation of protein targeting to membrane; positive regulation of vascular associated smooth muscle cell proliferation; positive regulation of vascular associated smooth muscle cell migration; signal transduction; stress-activated protein kinase signaling cascade; regulation of MAPK cascade; positive regulation of insulin receptor signaling pathway; cellular response to DNA damage stimulus; cell migration; chromatin remodeling
Sources:Amigo / QuickGO
Orthologs
Databases	NCBI: entry; OMA: entry
Species	Human	Mouse
Entrez	5058	18479
Ensembl	ENSG00000149269	ENSMUSG00000030774
UniProt	Q13153	O88643
RefSeq (mRNA)	NM_001128620; NM_002576	NM_011035; NM_001357362; NM_001357363; NM_001357364; NM_001357365
RefSeq (protein)	NP_001122092; NP_002567; NP_001363197; NP_001363198; NP_001363199 NP_001363200; NP_001363201; NP_001363202; NP_001363203; NP_001363204; NP_001363205; NP_001363206; NP_001363207; NP_001363208; NP_001363209; NP_001363210; NP_001363211; NP_001363212; NP_001363213; NP_001363214; NP_001363215; NP_001363216; NP_001363217; NP_001363218; NP_001363219; NP_001363220; NP_001363221; NP_001363222; NP_001363223; NP_001363224; NP_001363230; NP_001363231; NP_001363232; NP_001363233; NP_001363234	n/a
Location (UCSC)	Chr 11: 77.32 – 77.47 Mb	Chr 7: 97.44 – 97.56 Mb
PubMed search
- Wikidata
View/Edit Human	View/Edit Mouse

Serine/threonine-protein kinase PAK 1 is an enzyme that in humans is encoded by the PAK1 gene.

PAK1 is one of six members of the PAK family of serine/threonine kinases which are broadly divided into group I (PAK1, PAK2 and PAK3) and group II (PAK4, PAK6 and PAK5/7). The PAKs are evolutionarily conserved. PAK1 localizes in distinct sub-cellular domains in the cytoplasm and nucleus. PAK1 regulates cytoskeleton remodeling, phenotypic signaling and gene expression, and affects a wide variety of cellular processes such as directional motility, invasion, metastasis, growth, cell cycle progression, angiogenesis. PAK1-signaling dependent cellular functions regulate both physiologic and disease processes, including cancer, as PAK1 is widely overexpressed and hyperstimulated in human cancer, at-large. An activating point variant, c.1429G>T p.(Ala477Ser) (A477S), was reported in PAK1 in a patient with acute myeloid leukemia (AML). The variant was absent at diagnosis but detected at relapse, and functional studies showed that A477S increased PAK1 activation and promoted chemotherapy resistance.

== Discovery ==
PAK1 was first discovered as an effector of the Rho GTPases in rat brain by Manser and colleagues in 1994. The human PAK1 was identified as a GTP-dependent interacting partner of Rac1 or Cdc42 in the cytosolic fraction from neutrophils, and its complementary DNA was cloned from a human placenta library by Martin and Colleagues in 1995.

== Function ==
PAK proteins are critical effectors that link Rho GTPases to cytoskeleton reorganization and nuclear signaling. PAK proteins, a family of serine/threonine p21-activated kinases, include PAK1, PAK2, PAK3 and PAK4. These proteins serve as targets for the small GTP binding proteins Cdc42 and Rac and have been implicated in a wide range of biological activities. PAK1 regulates cell motility and morphology. Alternative transcripts of this gene have been found, but their full-length natures have not been determined.

Stimulation of PAK1 activity is accompanied by a series of cellular processes that are fundamental to living systems. PAK1 is a nodular signaling molecule, and operates as a converging station of a large number of signals triggered by proteins on the cell surface as well as upstream activators.

At the biochemical level, these activities are regulated by the ability of PAK1 to phosphorylate its effector interacting substrates, which sets up a cascade of biochemical events culminating in a cellular phenotypic response. PAK1 action is also influenced by its scaffolding activity. More recently, PAK1 has also been implicated in the regulation of pre-mRNA splicing through phosphorylation of components of the core splicing machinery, including the splicing regulator SRRM1, thereby influencing its scaffolding function. Examples of PAK1-regulated cellular processes include actin and microtubule fiber movement, critical steps during cell cycle progression, cell motility and invasion, redox and energy metabolism, cell survival, angiogenesis, DNA repair, hormone sensitivity, and gene expression. PAK1 signaling is implicated in oncogenesis, viral pathogenesis, cardiovascular dysregulation, and neurological disorders.

== Gene and spliced variants ==
The human PAK1 gene is 153 kb long and consists of 23 exons. Six of these code the 5'-UTR and 17 exons code proteins. Alternative splicing of six exons generates 20 transcripts from 308 bp to 3.7 kb long. Only 12 of these spliced transcripts have open reading frames and are predicted to code ten proteins and two polypeptides. The remaining 8 transcripts are non-coding RNAs from 308 bp to 863 bp in length. Unlike the human PAK1, murine PAK1 gene generates five transcripts: three protein-coding from 508 bp to 3.0 kb long, and two non-coding RNA transcripts of about 900 bp.

== Protein domains ==
The core domains of the PAK family include a kinase domain in the C-terminal region, a p21-binding domain, and an auto-inhibitory domain (AID) in group I PAKs. Group I PAKs exist in an inactive, closed homodimer conformation where the AID of one molecule binds to the kinase domain of another molecule. They are activated in both GTPase-dependent and independent manners.

== Activation/inhibition ==
The AID domain suppresses the catalytic activity of its kinase domain. PAK1 activators relieve this auto-inhibition and initiate conformational rearrangements and autophosphorylation events leading to kinase activation.

IPA-3 (1,1′-disulfanediyldinaphthalen-2-ol) is a small molecule allosteric inhibitor of PAK1. Preactivated PAK1 is resistant to IPA-3. Inhibition in live cells supports a critical role for PAK in PDGF-stimulated ERK activation. Reversible covalent binding of IPA-3 to the PAK1 regulatory domain prevents GTPase docking and the subsequent switch to a catalytically active state.

PAK1 knockdown in prostate cancer cells is associated with reduced motility, reduced MMP9 secretion and increased TGFβ expression, which in these cases, is growth inhibitory. However, IPA-3's pharmacokinetic properties as well as undesirable redox effects in cells, due to the continuous reduction of the sulfhydryl moiety, make it unsuitable for clinical development.

=== Upstream activators ===
PAK1 activity is stimulated by a large number of upstream activators and signals, ranging from epidermal growth factor, heregulin-beta 1, Vascular endothelial growth factor, basic fibroblast growth factor, platelet-derived growth factor, estrogen, lysophosphatidic acid, phosphoinositides, Epithelial and Endothelial Tyrosine Kinase, Protein kinase B, JAK2, Extracellular Signal-Regulated Kinase, casein kinase II, Rac3, chemokine (C-X-C motif) ligand 1, breast cancer anti-estrogen resistance 3, Kaposi's sarcoma-associated herpesvirus-G protein-coupled receptor, hepatitis B virus X protein, STE20-related kinase adaptor protein α, RhoI, Klotho, N-acetylglucosaminyl transferase V, B-Raf proto-oncogene, casein kinase 2-interacting protein 1, and filamin A.

=== Downstream effector targets ===
Functions of PAK1 are regulated by its ability to phosphorylate downstream effector substrates, scaffold activity, redistribution to distinct sub-cellular cellular sub-domains, stimulation or repression of expression of its genomic targets either directly or indirectly, or by all of these mechanisms. Representative PAK1 effector substrates in cancer cells include: Stathmin-S16, Merlin-S518, Vimentin-S25-S38-S50-S65-S72, Histone H3-S10, FilaminA-S2152, Estrogen receptor-alpha-S305, signal transducer and activator of transcription 5a-S779, C-terminal binding protein 1-S158, Raf1-S338, Arpc1b-T21, DLC1-S88, phosphoglucomutase 1-T466, SMART/HDAC1-associated repressor protein-S3486-T3568, Tubulin Cofactor B-S65-S128, Snail-S246, vascular endothelial-cadherin-S665, poly(RC) binding protein 1-T60-S246, integrin-linked kinase 1-T173-S246, epithelium-specific Ets transcription factor 1-S207, ErbB3 binding protein 1-T261, nuclear receptor-interacting factor 3-S28, SRC3-delta4-T56-S659-676, beta-catenin-S675, BAD-S111, BAD-S112, S136, MEK1-S298, CRKII-S41, MORC family CW-type zinc finger 2-S739, Paxillin-S258, Paxillin-S273, and SRRM1-T581-S583-S605.

=== Genomic targets ===
PAK1 and/or PAK1-dependent signals modulate the expression of its genomic targets, including, vascular endothelial growth factor, Cyclin D1, phosphofructokinase-muscle isoform, nuclear factor of activated T-cell, Cyclin B1, Tissue Factor and tissue factor pathway inhibitor, Metalloproteinase 9, and fibronectin.

== Interactions ==
PAK1 has been shown to interact with:

- ARHGEF2,
- ARPC1B,
- BMX,
- C-Raf,
- CDC42,
- Cyclin-dependent kinase 5,
- DYNLL1,
- LIMK1,
- NCK1,
- PAK1IP1 and
- RAC1.
