= Rho family of GTPases =

Family of small signalling G proteins

The Rho family of GTPases is a family of small (~21 kDa) signaling G proteins, and is a subfamily of the Ras superfamily. The members of the Rho GTPase family have been shown to regulate many aspects of intracellular actin dynamics, and are found in all eukaryotic kingdoms, including yeasts and some plants. Three members of the family have been studied in detail: Cdc42, Rac1, and RhoA. All G proteins are "molecular switches", and Rho proteins play a role in organelle development, cytoskeletal dynamics, cell movement, and other common cellular functions.

== History ==
Identification of the Rho family of GTPases began in the mid-1980s. The first identified Rho member was RhoA, isolated serendipitously in 1985 from a low stringency cDNA screening. Rac1 and Rac2 were identified next, in 1989 followed by Cdc42 in 1990. Eight additional mammalian Rho members were identified from biological screenings until the late 1990s, a turning point in biology where availability of complete genome sequences allowed full identification of gene families. All eukaryote cells contain Rho GTPase (ranging from 6 in yeast to 20 in mammals). In mammals, the Rho family is thus made of 20 members distributed in 8 subfamilies: Rho, Rnd, RhoD/F, RhoH, Rac, Cdc42, RhoU/V and RhoBTB.

As early as 1990, Paterson et al. began expressing activated Rho protein in Swiss 3T3 fibroblasts.

By the mid-1990s, Rho proteins had been observed to affect the formation of cellular projections ("processes") in fibroblasts. In a 1998 review article, Alan Hall compiled evidence showing that not only do fibroblasts form processes upon Rho activation, but so do virtually all eukaryotic cells.

A 2006 review article by Bement et al. explored the significance of spatial zones of Rho activation.

== Categorization ==
The Rho family of GTPases belong to the Ras superfamily of proteins, which consists of over 150 varieties in mammals. Rho proteins sometimes denote some members of the Rho family (RhoA, RhoB, and RhoC), and sometimes refers to all members of the family. This article is about the family as a whole.

In mammals, the Rho family contains 20 members. Almost all research involves the three most common members of the Rho family: Cdc42, Rac1 and RhoA.

Comparison
Rho family member	Action on actin filaments
Cdc42	affects filopodia
Rac1	affects lamellipodia
RhoA	affects stress fibres

These 20 mammalian members are subdivided in the Rac subfamily (Rac1, Rac2, Rac3, and RhoG), Cdc42 subfamily (Cdc42, TC10/RhoQ, TCL/RhoJ), the RhoUV family (RhoV/Chp and RhoU/Wrch-1/), RhoA subfamily (RhoA, RhoB, and RhoC), the Rnd subfamily (Rnd1/Rho6, Rnd2/RhoN and Rnd3/RhoE), the RhoD subfamily (RhoD and RhoF/Rif), RhoBTB (RhoBTB1&2) and RhoH/TTF.

Comparison
Subclass	Cytoskeletal effect	Rho family members
Cdc42 subclass	filopodia	Cdc42
Cdc42 subclass	filopodia	RhoQ (TC10)
Cdc42 subclass	filopodia	RhoJ (TCL)
RhoUV subclass	filopodia and lamellipodia	RhoU (Wrch)
RhoUV subclass	filopodia and lamellipodia	RhoV (Chp)
Rac	lamellipodia	Rac1
Rac	lamellipodia	Rac2
Rac	lamellipodia	Rac3
Rac	lamellipodia	RhoG
RhoBTB	protein stability	RhoBTB1
RhoBTB	protein stability	RhoBTB2
RhoBTB	protein stability	RhoBTB3
RhoH	Rac agonist?	RhoH
Rho (subclass)	↑stress fibres and ↑focal adhesions	RhoA
Rho (subclass)	↑stress fibres and ↑focal adhesions	RhoB
Rho (subclass)	↑stress fibres and ↑focal adhesions	RhoC
Rnd	↓stress fibres and ↓focal adhesions	Rnd1
Rnd	↓stress fibres and ↓focal adhesions	Rnd2
Rnd	↓stress fibres and ↓focal adhesions	Rnd3 (RhoE)
RhoF	Vesicle transport, filopodia	RhoD
RhoF	Vesicle transport, filopodia	RhoF (Rif)

== Regulators ==
Three general classes of regulators of Rho protein signaling have been identified: guanine nucleotide exchange factor (GEFs), GTPase-activating proteins (GAPs) and guanine nucleotide dissociation inhibitors (GDIs). GEFs activate Rho proteins by catalyzing the exchange of GDP for GTP. GAPs control the ability of the GTPase to hydrolyze GTP to GDP, controlling the natural rate of movement from the active conformation to the inactive conformation. GDI proteins form a large complex with the Rho protein, helping to prevent diffusion within the membrane and into the cytosol and thus acting as an anchor and allowing tight spatial control of Rho activation. In human, 82 GEF (71 Dbl-like and 11 DOCK-like) control positively the activity of Rho members, while 66 GAP proteins control it negatively.

Recent work has unveiled important additional regulatory mechanisms: microRNAs regulate post-transcriptional processing of Rho GTPase-encoding mRNAs; palmitoylation and nuclear targeting affect intracellular distribution; post-translational phosphorylation, transglutamination and AMPylation modulate Rho GTPase signaling; and ubiquitination controls Rho GTPase protein stability and turnover. These modes of regulation add to the complexity of the Rho GTPase signaling network and allow precise spatiotemporal control of individual Rho GTPases.

== Effectors ==
Each Rho protein affects numerous proteins downstream, all of which having roles in various cell processes. Over 60 targets of the three common Rho GTPases have been found. Two molecules that directly stimulate actin polymerization are the Arp2/3 proteins and the Diaphanous-related formins.

GTPase	Effector
RhoA	Cit, Cnksr1, Diaph1, Diaph2, DgkQ, FlnA, KcnA2, Ktn1, Rtkn1, Rtkn2, Rhpn1, Rhpn2, Itpr1, PlcG1, PI-5-p5K, Pld1, Pkn1, Pkn2, Rock1, Rock2, PrkcA, Ppp1r12A
Rac1	Sra1, IRSp53, PAK1, PAK2, PAK3
Cdc42	Wiskott-Aldrich syndrome protein, N-WASP, IRSp53, Dia2, Dia3, ROCK1, ROCK2, PAK4

== Functions ==
Rho/Rac proteins are involved in a wide variety of cellular functions such as cell polarity, vesicular trafficking, the cell cycle and transcriptomal dynamics.

=== Morphology ===
Animal cells form many different shapes based on their function and location in the body. Rho proteins help cells regulate changes in shape throughout their life-cycle. Before cells can undergo key processes such as budding, mitosis, or locomotion, it must have some manner of cell polarity.

One example of Rho GTPases' role in cell polarity is seen in the much-studied yeast cell. Before the cell can bud, Cdc42 is used to locate the region of the cell's membrane that will begin to bulge into the new cell. When Cdc42 is removed from the cell, the outgrowths still form, but do so in an unorganized manner.

One of the most obvious changes to cell morphology controlled by Rho proteins is the formation of lamellipodia and filopodia, projecting processes that look like "fingers" or "feet" and often propel cells or growth cones across surfaces. Virtually all eukaryotic cells form such processes upon Rho activation. Fibroblasts such as Swiss 3T3 cells are often used to study these phenomena.

==== Study techniques ====
Much of what is known about cellular morphology changes and the effects of Rho proteins comes from the creation of a constitutively active mutated form of the protein. Mutation of a key amino acid can alter the conformation of the entire protein, causing it to permanently adopt a conformation that resembles the GTP-bound state. This protein cannot be inactivated normally, through GTP hydrolysis, and is thus "stuck on". When a Rho protein activated in this manner is expressed in 3T3 cells, morphological changes such as contractions and filopodia formation ensue.

Because Rho proteins are G-proteins and plasma membrane bound, their location can be easily controlled. In each situation, whether it be wound healing, cytokinesis, or budding, the location of the Rho activation can be imaged and identified. For example, if a circular hole is inflicted in a spherical cell, Cdc42 and other active Rhos are seen in highest concentration around the circumference of the circular injury. One method of maintaining the spatial zones of activation is through anchoring to the actin cytoskeleton, keeping the membrane-bound protein from diffusing away from the region where it is most needed. Another method of maintenance is through the formation of a large complex that is resistant to diffusion and more rigidly bound to the membrane than the Rho itself.

=== Movement ===
In addition to the formation of lamellipodia and filopodia, intracellular concentration and cross-talk between different Rho proteins drives the extensions and contractions that cause cellular locomotion. Sakumura et al. proposed a model based on differential equations that helps explain the activity of Rho proteins and their relationship to motion. This model encompassed the three proteins Cdc42, RhoA, and Rac. Cdc42 was assumed to encourage filopodia elongation and block actin depolymerization. RhoA was considered to encourage actin retraction. Rac was treated to encourage lamellipodia extension but block actin depolymerization. These three proteins, although significantly simplified, covered the key steps in cellular locomotion. Through various mathematical techniques, solutions to the differential equations that described various regions of activity based on intracellular activity were found. The paper concludes by showing that the model predicts that there are a few threshold concentrations that cause interesting effects on the activity of the cell. Below a certain concentration, there is very little activity, causing no extension of the arms and feet of the cell. Above a certain concentration, the Rho protein causes a sinusoidal oscillation much like the extensions and contractions of the lamellipodia and filopodia. In essence, this model predicts that increasing the intracellular concentration of these three key active Rho proteins causes an out-of-phase activity of the cell, resulting in extensions and contractions that are also out of phase.

=== Wound healing ===
One example of behavior that is modulated by Rho GTPase proteins is in the healing of wounds. Wounds heal differently between young chicks and adult chickens. In young chicks, wounds heal by contraction, much like a draw-string being pulled to close a bag. In older chickens, cells crawl across the wound through locomotion. The actin formation required to close the wounds in young chicks is controlled by Rho GTPase proteins, since, after injection of a bacterial exoenzyme used to block rho and rac activity, the actin polymers do not form, and thus the healing completely fails.

=== Cell polarity ===
Studies in fibroblasts indicate positive feedback between Cdc42 activity and H+ efflux by the Na-H exchanger isoform 1 (NHE1) at the leading edge of migrating cells. NHE1-mediated H+ efflux is required for guanine nucleotide exchange factor (GEF)-catalyzed GTP binding to Cdc42, suggesting a mechanism for regulation of polarity by this small GTPase in migrating cells.

=== Phagocytosis ===
Another cellular behavior that is affected by rho proteins is phagocytosis. As with most other types of cell membrane modulation, phagocytosis requires the actin cytoskeleton in order to engulf other items. The actin filaments control the formation of the phagocytic cup, and active Rac1 and Cdc42 have been implicated in this signaling cascade.

=== Mitosis ===
Yet another major aspect of cellular behavior that is thought to include rho protein signaling is mitosis. While rho GTPase activity was thought for years to be restricted to actin polymerization and therefore to cytokinesis, which occurs after mitosis, new evidence has arisen that shows some activity in microtubule formation and the process of mitosis itself. This topic is still debated, and there is evidence both for and against for the importance of rho in mitosis.

== Applications ==
=== Nervous system regeneration ===
Because of their implications in cellular motility and shape, Rho proteins became a clear target in the study of the growth cones that form during axonal generation and regeneration in the nervous system. Rho proteins may be a potential target for delivery into spinal cord lesions after traumatic injury. Following injury to the spinal cord, the extracellular space becomes inhibitory to the natural efforts neurons undergo to regenerate.

These natural efforts include the formation of a growth cone at the proximal end of an injured axon. Newly formed growth cones subsequently attempt to "crawl" across the lesion. These are sensitive to chemical cues in the extracellular environment. One of the many inhibitory cues includes chondroitin sulfate proteoglycans (CSPGs). Neurons growing in culture become more able to cross regions of substrate coated with CSPG after expression of constitutively active Cdc42 or Rac1 or expression of a dominant negative form (inhibition) of RhoA.

This is partly due to the exogenous Rho proteins driving cellular locomotion despite the extracellular cues promoting apoptosis and growth cone collapse. Intracellular modulation of Rho proteins has thus become of interest in research aimed at spinal cord regeneration.

=== Intellectual disability ===
Dysfunction of Rho proteins has also been implicated in intellectual disability. Intellectual disability in some cases involves malformation of the dendritic spines, which form the post-synaptic connections between neurons. The misshapen dendritic spines can result from modulation of rho protein signaling. After the cloning of various genes implicated in X-linked intellectual disability, three genes that have effects on Rho signaling were identified, including oligophrenin-1 (a GAP protein that stimulates GTPase activity of Rac1, Cdc42, and RhoA), PAK3 (involved with the effects of Rac and Cdc42 on the actin cytoskeleton) and αPIX (a GEF that helps activate Rac1 and Cdc42). Because of the effect of Rho signaling on the actin cytoskeleton, genetic malfunctions of a rho protein could explain the irregular morphology of neuronal dendrites seen in some cases of intellectual disability.

=== Cancer ===
After finding that Ras proteins are mutated in 30% of human cancers, it was suspected that mutated Rho proteins might also be involved in cancer reproduction. However, as of August 2007, no oncogenic mutations have been found in Rho proteins, and only one has been found to be genetically altered. To explain the role of Rho pathways without mutation, researchers have now turned to the regulators of rho activity and the levels of expression of the Rho proteins for answers.

One way to explain altered signaling in the absence of mutation is through increased expression. Overexpression of RhoA, RhoB, RhoC, Rac1, Rac2, Rac3, RhoE, RhoG, RhoH, and Cdc42 has been shown in multiple types of cancer. This increased presence of so many signaling molecules implies that these proteins promote the cellular functions that become overly active in cancerous cells.

A second target to explain the role of the Rho proteins in cancer is their regulatory proteins. Rho proteins are very tightly controlled by a wide variety of sources, and over 60 activators and 70 inactivators have been identified. Multiple GAPs, GDIs, and GEFs have been shown to undergo overexpression, downregulation, or mutation in different types of cancer. Once an upstream signal is changed, the activity of its targets downstream—i.e., the Rho proteins—will change in activity.

Ellenbroek et al. outlined a number of different effects of Rho activation in cancerous cells. First, in the initiation of the tumor modification of Rho activity can suppress apoptosis and therefore contribute to artificial cell longevity. After natural apoptosis is suppressed, abnormal tumor growth can be observed through the loss of polarity in which Rho proteins play an integral role. Next, the growing mass can invade across its normal boundaries through the alteration of adhesion proteins potentially caused by Rho proteins. Finally, after inhibition of apoptosis, cell polarity and adhesion molecules, the cancerous mass is free to metastasize and spread to other regions of the body.

== See also ==
- MBInfo: Rho family of GTPases
- RHO protein GDP dissociation inhibitor
