= RHOBTB2 =

Protein-coding gene in the species Homo sapiens

Identifiers
- Aliases: RHOBTB2, DBC2, Rho related BTB domain containing 2, EIEE64, p83, DEE64
- External IDs: OMIM: 607352; MGI: 2180557; GeneCards: RHOBTB2
Enzyme activity
| EC # | BRENDA | ExPASy | KEGG | MetaCyc |
|---|---|---|---|---|
| 3.6.5.2 | ↗ | ↗ | ↗ | ↗ |

Gene location (Human)
| Chr. | Chromosome 8 (human) |
| Band | 8p21.3 | Start | 22,987,417 bp |
| Band | 8p21.3 | End | 23,020,509 bp |

Gene location (Mouse)
| Chr. | Chromosome 14 (mouse) |
| Band | 14|14 D2 | Start | 70,022,439 bp |
| Band | 14|14 D2 | End | 70,043,085 bp |
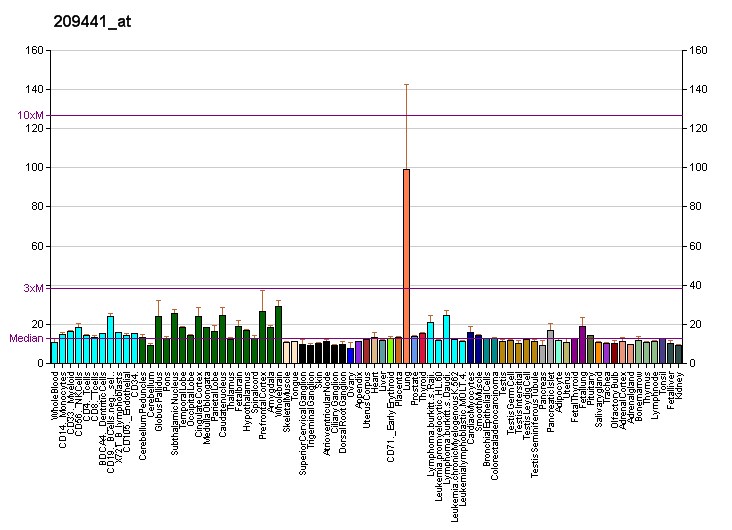
RNA expression pattern
| Bgee | Human / Mouse (ortholog); Top expressed in: upper lobe of left lung; right frontal lobe; prefrontal cortex; caudate nucleus; putamen; dorsolateral prefrontal cortex; right lung; Brodmann area 9; cingulate gyrus; anterior cingulate cortex / Top expressed in: retinal pigment epithelium; superior frontal gyrus; olfactory tubercle; primary visual cortex; primary motor cortex; dentate gyrus of hippocampal formation granule cell; piriform cortex; lens; superior colliculus; otic vesicle; More reference expression data |
| BioGPS | More reference expression data |
Gene ontology
| Molecular function | nucleotide binding; GTP binding; protein binding; GTPase activity; protein kinase binding |
| Cellular component | cytosol; plasma membrane; intracellular anatomical structure; cytoplasm; cytoskeleton; cell projection |
| Biological process | regulation of small GTPase mediated signal transduction; small GTPase mediated signal transduction; cell morphogenesis; actin filament organization; Rho protein signal transduction; cell migration; actin cytoskeleton organization; positive regulation of actin filament polymerization; actin cytoskeleton reorganization; engulfment of apoptotic cell |
Sources:Amigo / QuickGO
Orthologs
| Databases | NCBI: entry; OMA: entry |
| Species | Human | Mouse |
| Entrez | 23221 | 246710 |
| Ensembl | ENSG00000008853 | ENSMUSG00000022075 |
| UniProt | Q9BYZ6 | Q91V93 |
| RefSeq (mRNA) | NM_001160036; NM_001160037; NM_015178; NM_001374791 | NM_153514 |
| RefSeq (protein) | NP_001153508; NP_001153509; NP_055993; NP_001361720 | NP_705734 |
| Location (UCSC) | Chr 8: 22.99 – 23.02 Mb | Chr 14: 70.02 – 70.04 Mb |
| PubMed search |
- Wikidata
| View/Edit Human | View/Edit Mouse |

Rho-related BTB domain-containing protein 2 is a protein that in humans is encoded by the RHOBTB2 gene.

RHOBTB2 is a member of the evolutionarily-conserved RhoBTB subfamily of Rho GTPases. For background information on RhoBTBs, see RHOBTB1 (MIM 607351).[supplied by OMIM]

== Clinical significance ==
Mutations affecting RHOBTB2 can cause epilepsy, learning difficulties and movement disorders. RHOBTB2-related disorders are autosomal dominant, meaning only one of the two copies of the gene needs to be mutated to cause disease. The mutations usually occur de novo – that is, as a new mutation occurring in the affected individual rather than having been inherited.
