= GNTV =

GNTV may refer to:

- GMA News TV (now GTV)
- A-1,6-mannosyl-glycoprotein 6-b-N-acetylglucosaminyltransferase, an enzyme
