= Rif (GTPase) =

Small signalling G protein

Rif is a small (~21 kDa) signaling G protein (more specifically a GTPase), and is a member of the Rho family of GTPases. It is primarily active in the brain and plays a physiological role in the formation of neuronal dendritic spine. This process is regulated by FARP1, a type of activator for RhoA GTPases. Alternatively, Rif can induce the formation of actin stress fibers in epithelial cells, which is dependent on the activity levels of ROCK proteins since the absence of ROCK activity would mean Rif would be unable to stimulate the growth of stress fibers.

Rif is also seen expressed in diverse amount of human tissues such as in the colon and stomach due to Rho's use of actin dynamics to absorb intestinal epithelial cells. Rif is one way of generating filopodia (Rif-induced filopodia) through its interaction with mDia2. Specifically, the interaction is between the GTP from Rif and the GTPase binding domain (GBD) of mDia2. Rif's function in forming filopodia has a relation to the function of platelets. But in mice, Rif is not necessary for platelets to function. The co-expression of Rif with Rac or Cdc42, other GTPases that also participate in regulating cell structure and morphology, can give rise to new filopodial structures that differ from the filopodia arrangements stimulated by each of these GTPases functioning separately.
