= RhoC =

Protein found in humans

RHOC
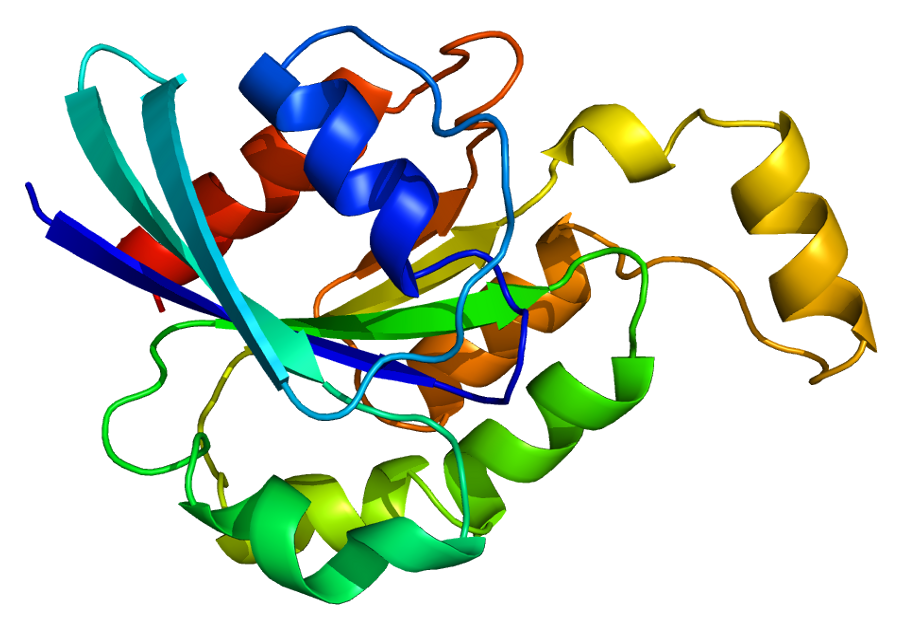

Identifiers
- Aliases: RHOC, ARH9, ARHC, H9, RHOH9, RhoC, ras homolog family member C
- External IDs: OMIM: 165380; MGI: 106028; GeneCards: RHOC
Available structures
PDB	Ortholog search: PDBe RCSB
PDB	List of PDB id codes 1Z2C, 2GCN, 2GCO, 2GCP
Enzyme activity
EC #	BRENDA	ExPASy	KEGG	MetaCyc
3.6.5.2	↗	↗	↗	↗

Gene location (Human)
Chr.	Chromosome 1 (human)
Band	1p13.2	Start	112,701,127 bp
Band	1p13.2	End	112,707,434 bp

Gene location (Mouse)
Chr.	Chromosome 3 (mouse)
Band	3|3 F2.2	Start	104,695,691 bp
Band	3|3 F2.2	End	104,701,775 bp
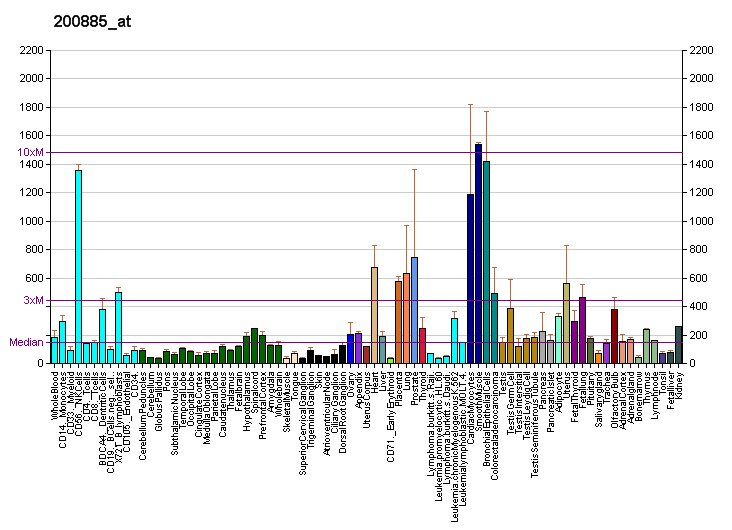
RNA expression pattern
Bgee	Human / Mouse (ortholog); Top expressed in: mucosa of transverse colon; stromal cell of endometrium; ascending aorta; apex of heart; Descending thoracic aorta; tibial nerve; right coronary artery; myometrium; smooth muscle tissue; left coronary artery / Top expressed in: decidua; gastrula; left colon; yolk sac; ascending aorta; aortic valve; duodenum; ankle joint; lacrimal gland; ciliary body; More reference expression data
BioGPS	More reference expression data
Gene ontology
Molecular function	nucleotide binding; GTP binding; protein binding; signal transducer activity; GTPase activity
Cellular component	cytosol; plasma membrane; cleavage furrow; extracellular exosome; membrane; nucleus; intracellular anatomical structure; stereocilium
Biological process	positive regulation of I-kappaB kinase/NF-kappaB signaling; skeletal muscle satellite cell migration; regulation of small GTPase mediated signal transduction; apical junction assembly; wound healing, spreading of cells; positive regulation of lipase activity; small GTPase mediated signal transduction; positive regulation of protein homooligomerization; mitotic cytokinesis; G protein-coupled receptor signaling pathway
Sources:Amigo / QuickGO
Orthologs
Databases	NCBI: entry; OMA: entry
Species	Human	Mouse
Entrez	389	11853
Ensembl	ENSG00000155366	ENSMUSG00000002233
UniProt	P08134; Q5JR06	Q62159
RefSeq (mRNA)	NM_175744; NM_001042678; NM_001042679	NM_001291859; NM_007484
RefSeq (protein)	NP_001036143; NP_001036144; NP_786886	NP_001278788; NP_031510
Location (UCSC)	Chr 1: 112.7 – 112.71 Mb	Chr 3: 104.7 – 104.7 Mb
PubMed search
- Wikidata
View/Edit Human	View/Edit Mouse

RhoC (Ras homolog gene family, member C) is a small (~21 kDa) signaling G protein (more specifically a GTPase), and is a member of the Rac subfamily of the family Rho family of GTPases. It is encoded by the gene RHOC.

== Mechanism and function ==
It is prenylated at its C-terminus, and localizes to the cytoplasm and plasma membrane. It is thought to be important in cell locomotion. It cycles between inactive GDP-bound and active GTP-bound states and function as molecular switches in signal transduction cascades. Rho proteins promote reorganization of the actin cytoskeleton and regulate cell shape and motility. RhoC can activate formins such as mDia1 and FMNL2 to remodel the cytoskeleton.

Overexpression of RhoC is associated with cell proliferation and causing tumors to become malignant. It causes degradation and reconstruction of the Extracellular Matrix (ECM) which helps cells escape the tissue they are currently in. It enhances cell motility giving it the ability to become invasive. It has been found to have a direct relationship to advanced tumor stage and metastasis, with increases in stage being related to increases in RhoC expression. RhoC-deficient mice can still develop tumors but these fail to metastasize, arguing that RhoC is essential for metastasis. It has also been found to enhance the creation of angiogenic factors such as VEGF, which is necessary for a tumor to become malignant. In a study by Vega, RhoC was knocked out which resulted in cells spreading out wide in all directions. When RhoC was disabled, the cell's abilities to move in a specific direction and migrate was impaired. It also reduced the cell's speed of movement, because it was difficult, and sometimes impossible, to polarize the cell.

== Associated signaling pathways ==
RhoC expression has been associated with several signaling pathways and effectors. Here is a list of the ones found so far:

- IQGAP1 (IQ-domain GTP-ase Activating Protein): an effector of RhoC to enhance expression of cyclin E and cyclin D1. This resulted in cells being promoted to enter S phase more rapidly
- ROCK-1
- MMP9: necessary for ECM regulation
- FMNL3: a Formin downstream target, which is used to regulate where Rac1 is active
- MAPK pathway: upregulating VEGF, Basic fibroblastic growth factors, and interleukins 6 and 8 expression
- Notch1
- PI3K/AKt pathway: Proliferation and invasiveness
- Pyk2: metastasis

== Types of cancer RhoC has been studied in ==
RhoC has been found to be overexpressed in:

- Lung cancer
- Gastric cancer
- Ovarian cancer
- Breast cancer
- Hepatocellular cancer
- Pancreatic cancer
- Colorectal cancer
- Cancer of the urogenital system
- Melanoma
- Prostate cancer
- Cervical carcinoma

== Potential therapies ==
RhoC small interfering RNA (siRNA) have been used in studies to successfully inhibit proliferation of some invasive cancers RhoC can be used as a biomarker for judging the metastatic potential of tumors One study used "recombinant adenovirus mediated RhoC shRNA in tandem linked expression" to successfully inhibit RhoC It has been found that RhoC expression is not important for embryogenesis but it is only important for metastasis, which would make it a good target for treatments. A RhoC targeted therapy (RV001 by RhoVac) is currently tested in prostate cancer in an ongoing clinical phase 2b program in the US and Europe. Results are expected mid 2022 (Reference: https://clinicaltrials.gov/ct2/show/NCT04114825)
