= RhoH =

Protein-coding gene in the species Homo sapiens

RHOH

Identifiers
- Aliases: RHOH, ARHH, TTF, RhoH, ras homolog family member H
- External IDs: OMIM: 602037; MGI: 1921984; GeneCards: RHOH
Enzyme activity
EC #	BRENDA	ExPASy	KEGG	MetaCyc
3.6.5.2	↗	↗	↗	↗

Gene location (Human)
Chr.	Chromosome 4 (human)
Band	4p14	Start	40,191,053 bp
Band	4p14	End	40,246,967 bp

Gene location (Mouse)
Chr.	Chromosome 5 (mouse)
Band	5|5 C3.1	Start	66,018,556 bp
Band	5|5 C3.1	End	66,054,043 bp
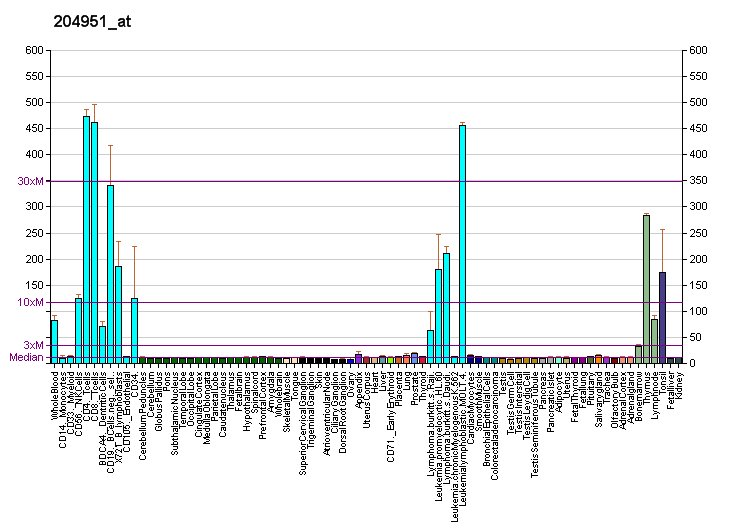
RNA expression pattern
Bgee	Human / Mouse (ortholog); Top expressed in: bone marrow cell; lymph node; appendix; granulocyte; thymus; spleen; blood; epithelium of nasopharynx; tonsil; epithelium of colon / Top expressed in: thymus; blood; mesenteric lymph nodes; spleen; primary oocyte; granulocyte; secondary oocyte; zygote; subcutaneous adipose tissue; bone marrow; More reference expression data
BioGPS	More reference expression data
Gene ontology
Molecular function	GTPase inhibitor activity; nucleotide binding; GTP binding; kinase inhibitor activity; protein binding; GTPase activity; protein kinase binding
Cellular component	cytosol; plasma membrane; cytoplasm; membrane; immunological synapse; intracellular anatomical structure; cell cortex; cell projection
Biological process	regulation of small GTPase mediated signal transduction; regulation of transcription, DNA-templated; negative regulation of I-kappaB kinase/NF-kappaB signaling; mast cell activation; T cell differentiation; negative regulation of phosphorylation; negative regulation of GTPase activity; small GTPase mediated signal transduction; actin filament organization; establishment or maintenance of cell polarity; Rho protein signal transduction; regulation of cell shape; actin cytoskeleton organization; negative regulation of kinase activity; regulation of actin cytoskeleton organization
Sources:Amigo / QuickGO
Orthologs
Databases	NCBI: entry; OMA: entry
Species	Human	Mouse
Entrez	399	74734
Ensembl	ENSG00000168421	ENSMUSG00000029204
UniProt	Q15669	Q9D3G9
RefSeq (mRNA)	NM_001278359; NM_001278360; NM_001278361; NM_001278362; NM_001278363 NM_001278364; NM_001278365; NM_001278366; NM_001278367; NM_001278368; NM_001278369; NM_004310	NM_001081105; NM_001363454
RefSeq (protein)	NP_001265288; NP_001265289; NP_001265290; NP_001265291; NP_001265292 NP_001265293; NP_001265294; NP_001265295; NP_001265296; NP_001265297; NP_001265298; NP_004301	NP_001074574; NP_001350383
Location (UCSC)	Chr 4: 40.19 – 40.25 Mb	Chr 5: 66.02 – 66.05 Mb
PubMed search
- Wikidata
View/Edit Human	View/Edit Mouse

RhoH (Ras homolog gene family, member H) is a small (~21 kDa) signaling G protein (more specifically a GTPase), and is a member of the Rac subfamily of the family Rho family of GTPases. It is encoded by the gene RHOH.

== Gene ==
Expression of a chimeric transcript of LAZ3 and this gene has been reported as a result of the translocation t(3;4) in non-Hodgkin's lymphomas. Unlike most other small G proteins which are expressed ubiquitously, this gene is transcribed only in hemopoietic cells.

== Interactions ==
RhoH has been shown to interact with ARHGDIA.
