= RhoBTB =

Protein subgroup of the Rho family of small GTPases

Rho-related BTB domain containing 1

Identifiers
- Symbol: RHOBTB1
- NCBI gene: 9886
- HGNC: 18738
- OMIM: 607351
- RefSeq: NM_014836
- UniProt: O94844

Other data
- Locus: Chr. 10 q22.1
Search for
- Structures: Swiss-model
- Domains: InterPro

Rho-related BTB domain containing 2

Identifiers
- Symbol: RHOBTB2
- NCBI gene: 23221
- HGNC: 18756
- OMIM: 607352
- RefSeq: NM_001160036
- UniProt: Q9BYZ6

Other data
- Locus: Chr. 8 p21.2
Search for
- Structures: Swiss-model
- Domains: InterPro

Rho-related BTB domain containing 3

Identifiers
- Symbol: RHOBTB3
- NCBI gene: 22836
- HGNC: 18757
- OMIM: 607353
- RefSeq: NM_014899
- UniProt: O94955

Other data
- Locus: Chr. 5 q15
Search for
- Structures: Swiss-model
- Domains: InterPro

The RhoBTB family is a subgroup of the Rho family of small GTPases. They are a highly divergent class and are all characterized by an N-terminal Rho-related domain followed by at least one C-terminal BTB domain.

== Discovery ==
The RhoBTB family of molecules was unknowingly discovered in 1993 by analyzing the Dictyostelium genome looking for members of the Ras superfamily of GTPases. The authors began by doing Southern blots looking for cDNAs that cross-hybridize with a very conservative probe from hRas. They identified 19 new genes that belonged to the Ras superfamily and sequenced approximately 600 nucleotides from the start of the transcript. If they were looking for a normal Ras-like GTPase, this would have been sufficient. One of their clones, they called RacA, was more divergent than most of the others and the transcript didn’t terminate in a stop codon like the rest. The authors, however, didn’t comment on this and RhoBTB went undiscovered for another eight years.

A very careful analysis by Francisco Rivero and coworkers ensued to find all of the Rho GTPases in Dictyostelium. During their endeavor, they found that the open reading frame of RacA was actually 400 amino acids longer than what Bush had published 8 years earlier. Instead of a 168 amino acid protein, RacA encoded a 598 residue protein with a Rho GTPase domain at the N-terminus and two BTB domains toward the C-terminus. BTB (Broad-Complex, Tramtrack and Bric-a-Brac) domains are known to involve hetero and homo associations with other BTB domain-containing proteins. Because this novel RhoBTB protein was in Dictostelium, the authors were curious if any homologous proteins exist in humans. They found three and called them RhoBTB1, RhoBTB2, and RhoBTB3.

== Localization and expression ==
RhoBTB1 and RhoBTB2 are much more homologous than RhoBTB3. Further analysis revealed that the intron-exon structure of RhoBTB1 and 2 are also quite similar and have only one common intron with RhoBTB3.

RhoBTB1 and 2 were not detected during mouse development, but RhoBTB3 was detected strongly between embryonic days 11.5 through 17.5. Additionally, RhoBTB1 and 2 are localized to vesicular structures, while RhoBTB3 is localized to the trans-Golgi network.
