= ARHGDIB =

Protein-coding gene in humans

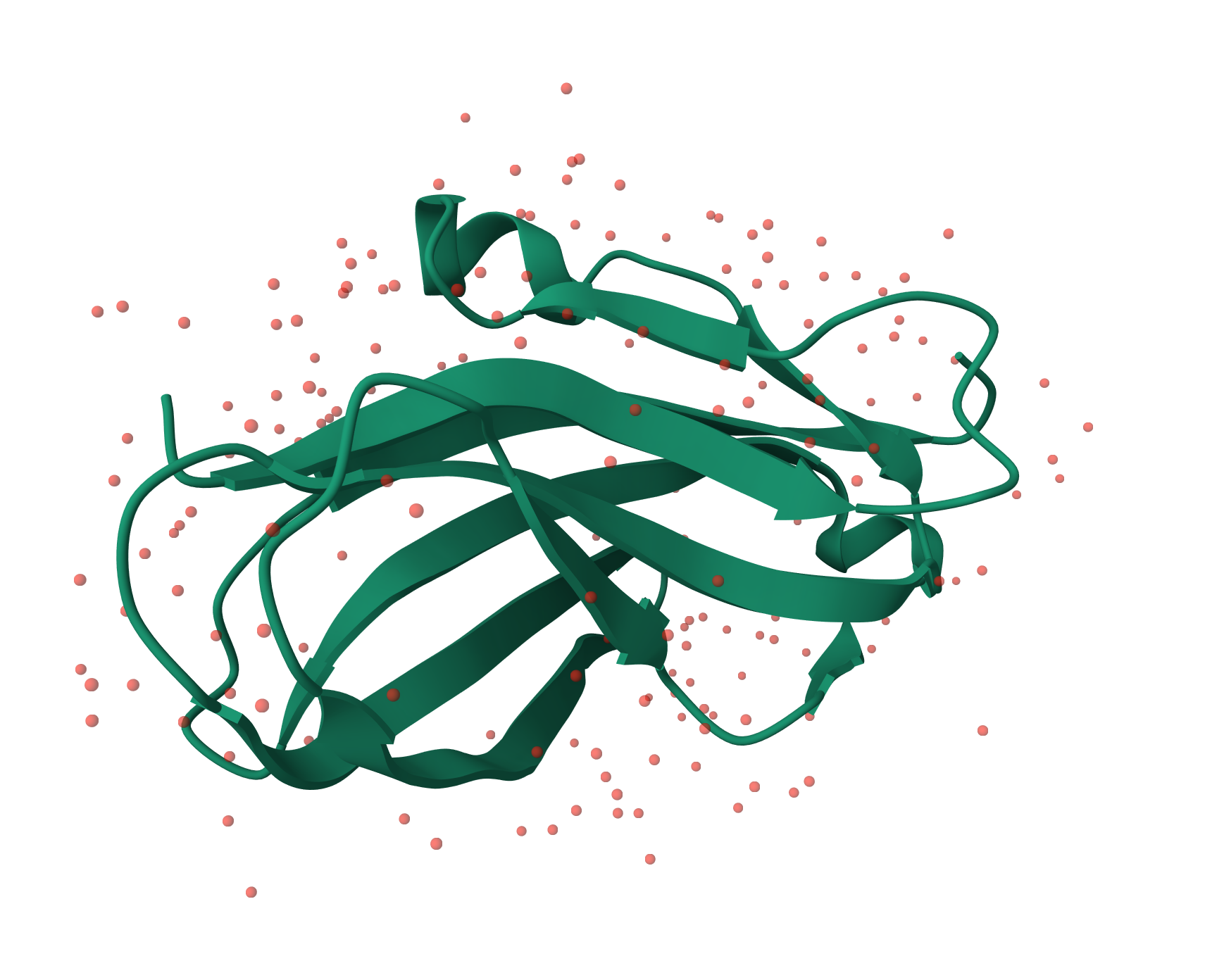

Identifiers
- Aliases: ARHGDIB, D4, GDIA2, GDID4, LYGDI, Ly-GDI, RAP1GN1, RhoGDI2, Rho GDP dissociation inhibitor beta
- External IDs: OMIM: 602843; MGI: 101940; GeneCards: ARHGDIB
Available structures
PDB	Ortholog search: PDBe RCSB
PDB	List of PDB id codes 1DS6

Gene location (Human)
Chr.	Chromosome 12 (human)
Band	12p12.3	Start	14,942,031 bp
Band	12p12.3	End	14,961,728 bp

Gene location (Mouse)
Chr.	Chromosome 6 (mouse)
Band	6|6 G1	Start	136,900,653 bp
Band	6|6 G1	End	136,918,897 bp
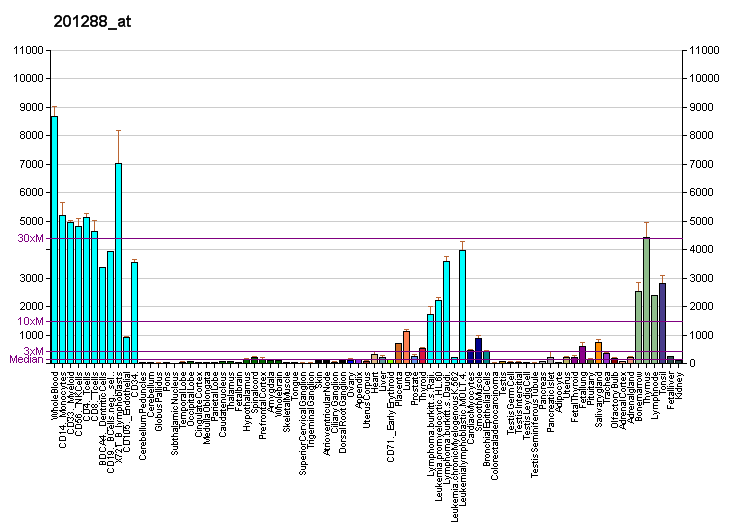
RNA expression pattern
Bgee	Human / Mouse (ortholog); Top expressed in: blood; monocyte; bone marrow; granulocyte; trabecular bone; spleen; lymph node; bone marrow cell; appendix; thymus / Top expressed in: granulocyte; tibiofemoral joint; thymus; spleen; mesenteric lymph nodes; blood; bone marrow; endothelial cell of lymphatic vessel; stroma of bone marrow; calvaria; More reference expression data
BioGPS	More reference expression data
Gene ontology
Molecular function	GTPase activator activity; Rho GDP-dissociation inhibitor activity; protein binding; GTPase activity
Cellular component	cytoplasm; cytosol; membrane; extracellular exosome; cytoskeleton; cytoplasmic vesicle
Biological process	negative regulation of cell adhesion; regulation of actin cytoskeleton reorganization; negative regulation of trophoblast cell migration; multicellular organism development; positive regulation of GTPase activity; cellular response to redox state; regulation of Rho protein signal transduction; regulation of small GTPase mediated signal transduction; regulation of catalytic activity; Rho protein signal transduction
Sources:Amigo / QuickGO
Orthologs
Databases	NCBI: entry; OMA: entry
Species	Human	Mouse
Entrez	397	11857
Ensembl	ENSG00000111348	ENSMUSG00000030220
UniProt	P52566	Q61599
RefSeq (mRNA)	NM_001175; NM_001321420; NM_001321421; NM_001321422; NM_001321423	NM_001301301; NM_001301303; NM_001301305; NM_001301308; NM_001301309 NM_007486
RefSeq (protein)	NP_001166; NP_001308349; NP_001308350; NP_001308351; NP_001308352	NP_001288230; NP_001288232; NP_001288234; NP_001288237; NP_001288238 NP_031512
Location (UCSC)	Chr 12: 14.94 – 14.96 Mb	Chr 6: 136.9 – 136.92 Mb
PubMed search
- Wikidata
View/Edit Human	View/Edit Mouse

Rho GDP-dissociation inhibitor 2 is a protein that in humans is encoded by the ARHGDIB gene. Aliases of this gene include RhoGDI2, GDID4, Rho GDI 2, and others.

== Interactions ==
ARHGDIB has been shown to interact with VAV1 and Src.

== Gene family ==
RhoGDI2 (ARHGDIB) is part of a family of three members: RhoGDI1, RhoGDI2 (also known as RhoGDIB, D4-GDI or Ly-GDI) and RhoGDI3. RhoGDI1 is expressed in many organs and is the best studied member of the family. RhoGDI2 was initially believed to be expressed specifically in blood forming cells, but has subsequently been found to be highly expressed in a variety of other cell types as well. RhoGDI3 is predominantly expressed in brain, lung, kidney, testis and pancreas, and is targeted to specific parts of the cell such as the Golgi where it may play a role in transport or proteins in cells.

== Disease involvement ==
Despite a high degree of sequence similarity, RhoGDI1 and RhoGDI2 are very different in their binding affinities for specific GTPases, and more importantly, in their roles in tumor formation and spread of tumor to other organs (the process of metastasis). For example, RhoGDI2 functions as a suppressor of metastasis but not a tumor suppressor in bladder cancer cells, while RhoGDI1 is a ubiquitous suppressor of tumor growth in all sites so far examined in bladder cancer models), suggesting that their cellular functions must diverge to cause these differential effects.

While there are clear links between the alteration of RhoGDI2 protein levels and disease progression and/or metastasis in several types of cancer, the mechanistic underpinnings of the mode of RhoGDI2 action under carcinogenic cellular conditions are only now beginning to be understood. Evidence demonstrates that RhoGDI2 inhibits the endothelin axis and crosstalk with macrophages within the micrometastatic microenvironment to inhibit metastatic outgrowth. As such, RhoGDI2 could prove important in the regulation of tumor dormancy. Targeting this axis with orally available endothelin receptor antagonists may prove efficacious in mimicking the inhibitory role of RhoGDI2 by preventing macrophage infiltration into the micrometastatic niche. Recent work has also determined that genetic and pharmacologic targeting of chemokine (C-C motif) ligand 2 (CCL2) also known as monocyte chemotactic protein-1 (MCP-1) or small inducible cytokine A2, its receptor CCR2 and pharmacologic ablation of macrophages can also phenocopy the effect of RhoGDI2 expression to prevent metastatic colonization of the lung67 and that RhoGDI2 is suppressor of versican, a protein that has been shown to promote cell migration and metastasis in several tumor models.

In contrast to its role as a metastasis suppressor in bladder cancer, in breast, RhoGDI2 expression has been reported to be upregulated in cancer and to promote invasion of breast cancer cells, while another report found a biphasic expression pattern of RhoGDI2 in breast cancer with decreased expression correlating with lymph node metastasis.

ARHGDIB antibodies may be a marker for long-term kidney graft loss in recipients of deceased-donor kidneys.
