= RAC2 =

Protein-coding gene in the species Homo sapiens

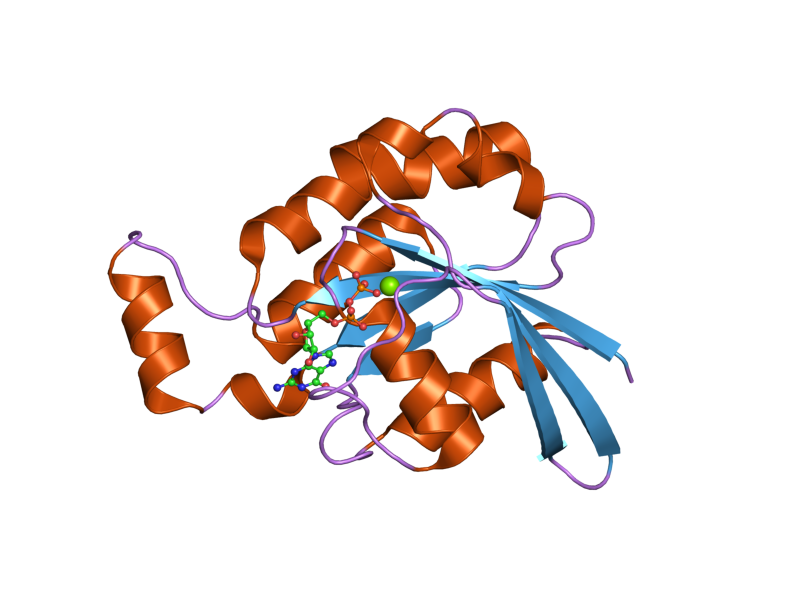

Identifiers
- Aliases: RAC2, EN-7, Gx, HSPC022, p21-Rac2, ras-related C3 botulinum toxin substrate 2 (rho family, small GTP binding protein Rac2), Rac family small GTPase 2, IMD73B, IMD73C, IMD73A
- External IDs: OMIM: 602049; MGI: 97846; GeneCards: RAC2
Available structures
PDB	Ortholog search: PDBe RCSB
PDB	List of PDB id codes 1DS6, 2W2T, 2W2V, 2W2X
Enzyme activity
EC #	BRENDA	ExPASy	KEGG	MetaCyc
3.6.5.2	↗	↗	↗	↗

Gene location (Human)
Chr.	Chromosome 22 (human)
Band	22q13.1	Start	37,225,270 bp
Band	22q13.1	End	37,244,448 bp

Gene location (Mouse)
Chr.	Chromosome 15 (mouse)
Band	15|15 E1	Start	78,443,367 bp
Band	15|15 E1	End	78,456,983 bp
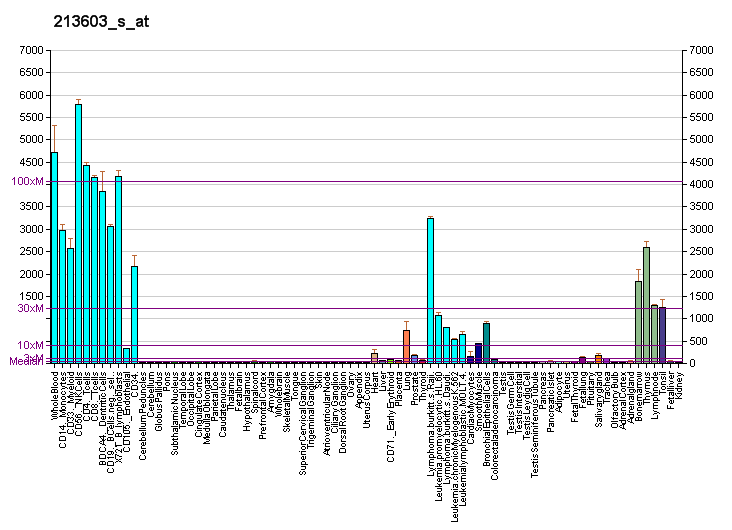
RNA expression pattern
Bgee	Human / Mouse (ortholog); Top expressed in: granulocyte; blood; spleen; bone marrow; bone marrow cell; appendix; monocyte; trabecular bone; thymus; lymph node / Top expressed in: granulocyte; tibiofemoral joint; thymus; spleen; mesenteric lymph nodes; blood; ankle joint; fetal liver hematopoietic progenitor cell; bone marrow; stroma of bone marrow; More reference expression data
BioGPS	More reference expression data
Gene ontology
Molecular function	nucleotide binding; GTP binding; protein kinase regulator activity; GTPase activity; protein binding
Cellular component	cytoplasm; cytosol; phagocytic vesicle membrane; nuclear envelope; membrane; focal adhesion; plasma membrane; actin filament; extracellular exosome; lamellipodium; intracellular anatomical structure
Biological process	regulation of respiratory burst; lymphocyte aggregation; regulation of T cell proliferation; positive regulation of protein targeting to mitochondrion; regulation of hydrogen peroxide metabolic process; actin filament organization; regulation of cell-substrate adhesion; regulation of neutrophil migration; bone resorption; platelet activation; chemotaxis; cell projection assembly; positive regulation of cell population proliferation; regulation of mast cell chemotaxis; positive regulation of neutrophil chemotaxis; regulation of mast cell degranulation; regulation of protein kinase activity; positive regulation of lamellipodium assembly; regulation of small GTPase mediated signal transduction; actin cytoskeleton organization; signal transduction; small GTPase mediated signal transduction; G protein-coupled receptor signaling pathway
Sources:Amigo / QuickGO
Orthologs
Databases	NCBI: entry; OMA: entry
Species	Human	Mouse
Entrez	5880	19354
Ensembl	ENSG00000128340	ENSMUSG00000033220
UniProt	P15153	Q05144
RefSeq (mRNA)	NM_002872	NM_009008
RefSeq (protein)	NP_002863	NP_033034
Location (UCSC)	Chr 22: 37.23 – 37.24 Mb	Chr 15: 78.44 – 78.46 Mb
PubMed search
- Wikidata
View/Edit Human	View/Edit Mouse

Rac2 (Ras-related C3 botulinum toxin substrate 2) is a small (~21 kDa) signaling G protein (to be specific, a GTPase), and is a member of the Rac subfamily of the family Rho family of GTPases. It is encoded by the gene RAC2.

Members of Rho family of GTPases appear to regulate a diverse array of cellular events, including the control of cell growth, cytoskeletal reorganization, and the activation of protein kinases.

== Interactions ==
Rac2 has been shown to interact with ARHGDIA and Nitric oxide synthase 2A.

== See also ==
- NADPH oxidase
