= RHOJ =

Protein-coding gene in the species Homo sapiens

Identifiers
- Aliases: RHOJ, ARHJ, RASL7B, TC10B, TCL, ras homolog family member J
- External IDs: OMIM: 607653; MGI: 1931551; GeneCards: RHOJ
Enzyme activity
EC #	BRENDA	ExPASy	KEGG	MetaCyc
3.6.5.2	↗	↗	↗	↗

Gene location (Human)
Chr.	Chromosome 14 (human)
Band	14q23.2	Start	63,204,114 bp
Band	14q23.2	End	63,293,508 bp

Gene location (Mouse)
Chr.	Chromosome 12 (mouse)
Band	12|12 C3	Start	75,355,096 bp
Band	12|12 C3	End	75,448,230 bp
RNA expression pattern
Bgee	Human / Mouse (ortholog); Top expressed in: tendon of biceps brachii; sural nerve; smooth muscle tissue; gallbladder; left uterine tube; skin of hip; upper lobe of left lung; endothelial cell; body of uterus; lower lobe of lung / Top expressed in: semi-lunar valve; aortic valve; umbilical cord; ascending aorta; external carotid artery; internal carotid artery; ciliary body; gastrula; endothelial cell of lymphatic vessel; parotid gland; More reference expression data
BioGPS	n/a
Gene ontology
Molecular function	nucleotide binding; GTP binding; protein binding; GTPase activity; protein kinase binding
Cellular component	cytosol; plasma membrane; extracellular exosome; membrane; intracellular anatomical structure; cytoplasm; cell cortex; cell projection
Biological process	regulation of small GTPase mediated signal transduction; retina vasculature morphogenesis in camera-type eye; actin cytoskeleton organization; Rho protein signal transduction; regulation of cell shape; small GTPase mediated signal transduction; angiogenesis; endocytosis; actin filament organization; establishment or maintenance of cell polarity; regulation of endothelial cell migration; cell projection assembly; regulation of actin cytoskeleton organization; positive regulation of cell migration involved in sprouting angiogenesis; regulation of sprouting angiogenesis
Sources:Amigo / QuickGO
Orthologs
Databases	NCBI: entry; OMA: entry
Species	Human	Mouse
Entrez	57381	80837
Ensembl	ENSG00000126785	ENSMUSG00000046768
UniProt	Q9H4E5	Q9ER71
RefSeq (mRNA)	NM_020663	NM_023275
RefSeq (protein)	NP_065714; NP_065714.1	NP_075764
Location (UCSC)	Chr 14: 63.2 – 63.29 Mb	Chr 12: 75.36 – 75.45 Mb
PubMed search
- Wikidata
View/Edit Human	View/Edit Mouse

Rho-related GTP-binding protein RhoJ is a protein that in humans is encoded by the RHOJ gene.

ARHJ belongs to the Rho family of small GTP-binding proteins. Rho proteins regulate the dynamic assembly of cytoskeletal components for several physiologic processes, such as cell proliferation and motility and the establishment of cell polarity. They are also involved in pathophysiologic process, such as cell transformation and metastasis.[supplied by OMIM]
