= Nitric oxide synthase 2 (inducible) =

Protein-coding gene in the species Homo sapiens

NOS2
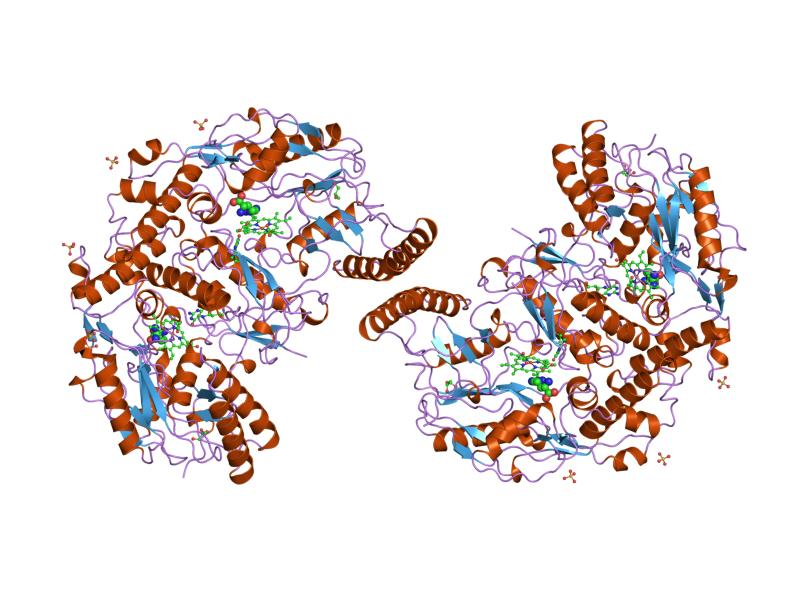

Identifiers
- Aliases: NOS2, HEP-NOS, NOS, NOS2A, Nitric oxide synthase 2, iNOS
- External IDs: OMIM: 163730; MGI: 97361; GeneCards: NOS2
Available structures
PDB	Ortholog search: PDBe RCSB
PDB	List of PDB id codes 1NSI, 2LL6, 2NSI, 3E7G, 3EJ8, 3HR4, 4CX7, 4NOS
Enzyme activity
EC #	BRENDA	ExPASy	KEGG	MetaCyc
1.14.13.39	↗	↗	↗	↗

Gene location (Human)
Chr.	Chromosome 17 (human)
Band	17q11.2	Start	27,756,766 bp
Band	17q11.2	End	27,800,529 bp

Gene location (Mouse)
Chr.	Chromosome 11 (mouse)
Band	11 B5|11 46.74 cM	Start	78,811,613 bp
Band	11 B5|11 46.74 cM	End	78,851,080 bp
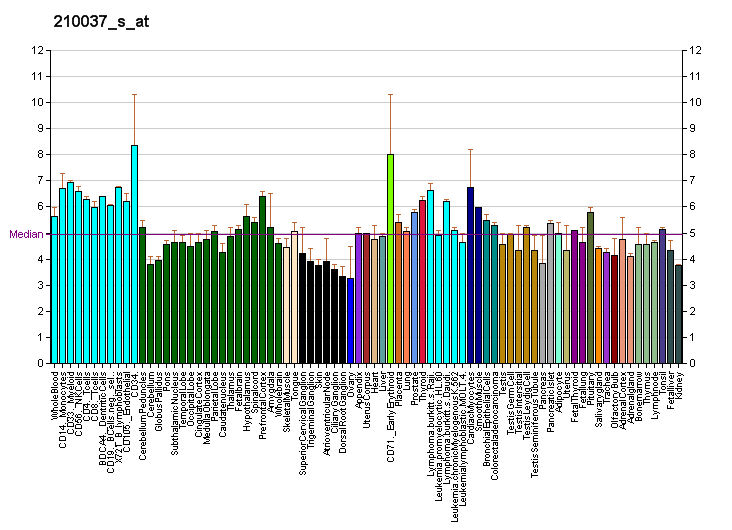
RNA expression pattern
Bgee	Human / Mouse (ortholog); Top expressed in: cartilage tissue; olfactory zone of nasal mucosa; mucosa of paranasal sinus; mucosa of transverse colon; rectum; appendix; testicle; prefrontal cortex; duodenum; right frontal lobe / Top expressed in: Ileal epithelium; jejunum; muscle of thigh; placenta; thymus; entorhinal cortex; skeletal muscle tissue; esophagus; neural tube; dentate gyrus of hippocampal formation granule cell; More reference expression data
BioGPS	More reference expression data
Gene ontology
Molecular function	FMN binding; protein homodimerization activity; flavin adenine dinucleotide binding; arginine binding; tetrahydrobiopterin binding; metal ion binding; calmodulin binding; protein binding; heme binding; oxidoreductase activity; signaling receptor binding; nitric-oxide synthase activity; NADPH-hemoprotein reductase activity; NADP binding
Cellular component	cytoplasm; cytosol; cortical cytoskeleton; peroxisome; intracellular anatomical structure; perinuclear region of cytoplasm; nucleus; peroxisomal matrix; plasma membrane; vesicle membrane
Biological process	positive regulation of guanylate cyclase activity; response to hypoxia; nitric oxide biosynthetic process; positive regulation of leukocyte mediated cytotoxicity; response to bacterium; negative regulation of protein catabolic process; regulation of insulin secretion; negative regulation of blood pressure; regulation of cytokine production involved in inflammatory response; positive regulation of killing of cells of other organism; negative regulation of gene expression; cell redox homeostasis; arginine catabolic process; prostaglandin secretion; response to lipopolysaccharide; innate immune response in mucosa; regulation of cell population proliferation; peptidyl-cysteine S-nitrosylation; defense response to bacterium; circadian rhythm; defense response to Gram-negative bacterium; nitric oxide mediated signal transduction; cellular response to interferon-gamma; regulation of cellular respiration; cellular response to lipopolysaccharide; superoxide metabolic process; cytokine-mediated signaling pathway; protein targeting to peroxisome; response to hormone
Sources:Amigo / QuickGO
Orthologs
Databases	NCBI: entry; OMA: entry
Species	Human	Mouse
Entrez	4843	18126
Ensembl	ENSG00000007171	ENSMUSG00000020826
UniProt	P35228	P29477
RefSeq (mRNA)	NM_000625; NM_153292	NM_010927; NM_001313921; NM_001313922
RefSeq (protein)	NP_000616	NP_001300850; NP_001300851; NP_035057
Location (UCSC)	Chr 17: 27.76 – 27.8 Mb	Chr 11: 78.81 – 78.85 Mb
PubMed search
- Wikidata
View/Edit Human	View/Edit Mouse

Nitric oxide synthase, inducible is an enzyme which is encoded by the NOS2 gene in humans and mice.

== Genetics ==
Three related pseudogenes are located within the Smith-Magenis syndrome region on chromosome 17. Alternative splicing of this gene results in two transcript variants encoding different isoforms.

== Location ==
Nitric oxide synthase is expressed in epithelial cells of the liver, lung and bone marrow. It is inducible by a combination of lipopolysaccharide and certain cytokines.

== Function ==
Nitric oxide is a reactive free radical mediating in neurotransmission, antimicrobial and antitumoral activities. In mice, the function of Nos2 in immunity against a number of viruses, bacteria, fungi, and parasites has been well characterized, whereas in humans the role of NOS2 has remained elusive and controversial. Nos2 is important for protective immunity against CMV.

Caveolin 1 has been shown to interact with Nitric oxide synthase 2A. and Rac2.

== Deficiency ==
Autosomal recessive NOS2 deficiency has been described in mice. They lack the gene encoding nitric oxide synthase 2 (Nos2) and are susceptible to murine CMV infection.

In February 2020, the same autosomal recessive, complete NOS2 deficiency was described in a human. A 51-year-old previously healthy person died after 29 months of progressive CMV infection due to respiratory failure secondary to CMV pneumonitis, CMV encephalitis, and hemophagocytic lymphohistiocytosis. Whole-exome sequencing on genomic DNA from his blood showed he had homozygous variants in five genes. The only loss-of-function variant was a homozygous frameshift mutation in nitric oxide synthase 2. This condition is extremely rare, occurring in fewer than 1 per million persons.
