= ARHGEF2 =

Protein-coding gene in humans

Identifiers
- Aliases: ARHGEF2, GEF, GEF-H1, GEFH1, LFP40, P40, Rho/Rac guanine nucleotide exchange factor 2, NEDMHM, Lfc
- External IDs: OMIM: 607560; MGI: 103264; GeneCards: ARHGEF2
Available structures
PDB	Ortholog search: PDBe RCSB
PDB	List of PDB id codes 5EFX

Gene location (Human)
Chr.	Chromosome 1 (human)
Band	1q22	Start	155,946,851 bp
Band	1q22	End	156,007,070 bp

Gene location (Mouse)
Chr.	Chromosome 3 (mouse)
Band	3|3 F1	Start	88,513,273 bp
Band	3|3 F1	End	88,555,359 bp
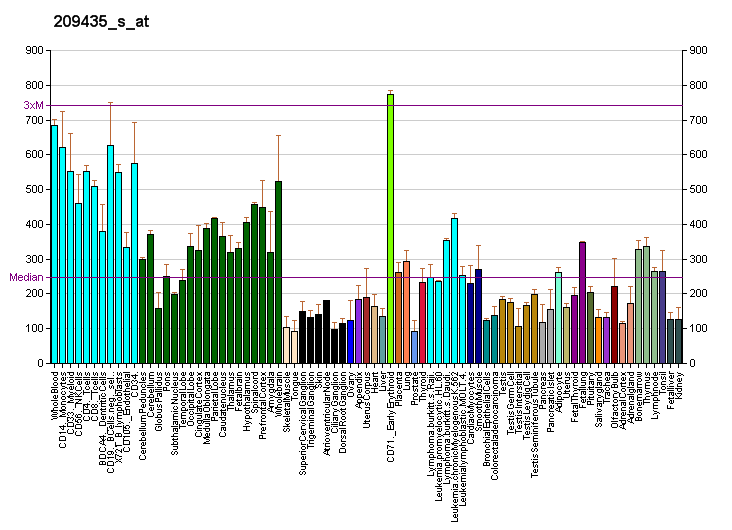

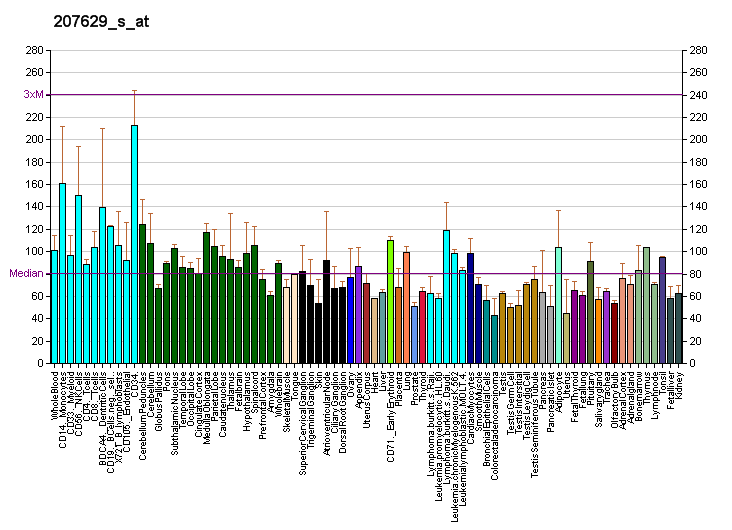
RNA expression pattern
Bgee	Human / Mouse (ortholog); Top expressed in: inferior ganglion of vagus nerve; ganglionic eminence; corpus callosum; C1 segment; olfactory bulb; blood; granulocyte; sural nerve; upper lobe of left lung; right lung / Top expressed in: spermatid; seminiferous tubule; superior frontal gyrus; granulocyte; dentate gyrus of hippocampal formation granule cell; ventricular zone; primary visual cortex; neural layer of retina; neural tube; thymus; More reference expression data
BioGPS	More reference expression data
Gene ontology
Molecular function	microtubule binding; zinc ion binding; transcription factor binding; metal ion binding; protein binding; guanyl-nucleotide exchange factor activity
Cellular component	cytoplasm; vesicle; cytosol; Golgi apparatus; cell projection; membrane; focal adhesion; bicellular tight junction; spindle; plasma membrane; dendritic shaft; ruffle membrane; cell junction; soma; microtubule; cytoskeleton; cytoplasmic vesicle; podosome; postsynaptic density; protein-containing complex; glutamatergic synapse; postsynaptic density, intracellular component
Biological process	intracellular signal transduction; negative regulation of intrinsic apoptotic signaling pathway in response to osmotic stress; negative regulation of necroptotic process; actin filament organization; immune system process; negative regulation of neurogenesis; cellular response to tumor necrosis factor; cell division; cellular response to muramyl dipeptide; cellular hyperosmotic response; negative regulation of microtubule depolymerization; regulation of cell population proliferation; positive regulation of NF-kappaB transcription factor activity; negative regulation of extrinsic apoptotic signaling pathway via death domain receptors; cell morphogenesis; establishment of mitotic spindle orientation; positive regulation of interleukin-6 production; positive regulation of tumor necrosis factor production; positive regulation of apoptotic process; positive regulation of peptidyl-tyrosine phosphorylation; cell cycle; regulation of Rho protein signal transduction; intracellular protein transport; innate immune response; regulation of small GTPase mediated signal transduction; positive regulation of transcription by RNA polymerase II; negative regulation of podosome assembly; G protein-coupled receptor signaling pathway; positive regulation of neuron differentiation; asymmetric neuroblast division; positive regulation of neuron migration; multicellular organism development; nervous system development; cell differentiation
Sources:Amigo / QuickGO
Orthologs
Databases	NCBI: entry; OMA: entry
Species	Human	Mouse
Entrez	9181	16800
Ensembl	ENSG00000116584	ENSMUSG00000028059
UniProt	Q92974	Q60875
RefSeq (mRNA)	NM_001162383; NM_001162384; NM_004723; NM_001350110; NM_001350111 NM_001350112	NM_001198911; NM_001198912; NM_001198913; NM_008487; NM_001377126
RefSeq (protein)	NP_001155855; NP_001155856; NP_004714; NP_001337039; NP_001337040 NP_001337041	NP_001185840; NP_001185841; NP_001185842; NP_032513; NP_001364055
Location (UCSC)	Chr 1: 155.95 – 156.01 Mb	Chr 3: 88.51 – 88.56 Mb
PubMed search
- Wikidata
View/Edit Human	View/Edit Mouse

Rho guanine nucleotide exchange factor 2 is a protein that in humans is encoded by the ARHGEF2 gene.

== Function ==
Rho GTPases play a fundamental role in numerous cellular processes that are initiated by extracellular stimuli that work through G protein-coupled receptors. The encoded protein may form complex with G proteins and stimulate rho-dependent signals.

== Interactions ==
ARHGEF2 has been shown to interact with PAK1.
