= FHOD1 =

Protein-coding gene in the species Homo sapiens

Identifiers
- Aliases: FHOD1, FHOS, formin homology 2 domain containing 1
- External IDs: OMIM: 606881; MGI: 2679008; GeneCards: FHOD1
Available structures
PDB	Ortholog search: PDBe RCSB
PDB	List of PDB id codes 3DAD

Gene location (Human)
Chr.	Chromosome 16 (human)
Band	16q22.1	Start	67,229,387 bp
Band	16q22.1	End	67,247,481 bp

Gene location (Mouse)
Chr.	Chromosome 8 (mouse)
Band	8|8 D3	Start	106,055,795 bp
Band	8|8 D3	End	106,074,585 bp
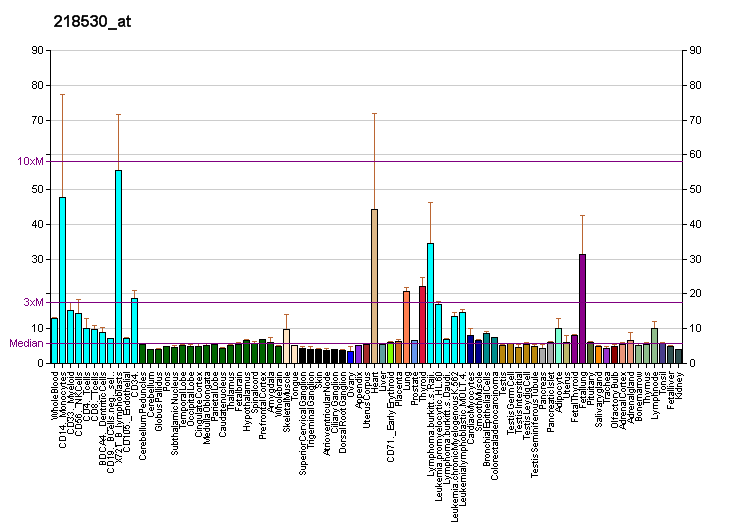
RNA expression pattern
Bgee	Human / Mouse (ortholog); Top expressed in: spleen; gastrocnemius muscle; upper lobe of left lung; muscle of thigh; right lung; apex of heart; granulocyte; right lobe of thyroid gland; glutes; right adrenal cortex / Top expressed in: granulocyte; inner renal medulla; glomerulus; left lung lobe; muscle of thigh; neural layer of retina; upper arm; knee joint; body of femur; skeletal muscle tissue; More reference expression data
BioGPS	More reference expression data
Gene ontology
Molecular function	actin binding; protein binding; identical protein binding; protein domain specific binding; protein self-association
Cellular component	cell projection; bleb; membrane; nucleus; cytoskeleton; stress fiber; cytoplasm; cytosol; intercalated disc
Biological process	positive regulation of stress fiber assembly; nuclear migration; establishment of centrosome localization; positive regulation of transcription by RNA polymerase II; regulation of stress fiber assembly
Sources:Amigo / QuickGO
Orthologs
Databases	NCBI: entry; OMA: entry
Species	Human	Mouse
Entrez	29109	234686
Ensembl	ENSG00000135723	ENSMUSG00000014778
UniProt	Q9Y613	Q6P9Q4
RefSeq (mRNA)	NM_013241; NM_001318202	NM_177699
RefSeq (protein)	NP_001305131; NP_037373	NP_808367
Location (UCSC)	Chr 16: 67.23 – 67.25 Mb	Chr 8: 106.06 – 106.07 Mb
PubMed search
- Wikidata
View/Edit Human	View/Edit Mouse

FH1/FH2 domain-containing protein 1 is a protein that in humans is encoded by the FHOD1 gene.

This gene encodes a protein which is a member of the formin/diaphanous family of proteins. The gene is ubiquitously expressed but is found in abundance in the spleen. The encoded protein has sequence homology to diaphanous and formin proteins within the Formin Homology (FH)1 and FH2 domains. It also contains a coiled-coil domain, a collagen-like domain, two nuclear localization signals, and several potential PKC and PKA phosphorylation sites. It is a predominantly cytoplasmic protein and is expressed in a variety of human cell lines.

== Interactions ==
FHOD1 has been shown to interact with RAC1.
