= PAK3 =

Mammalian protein found in Homo sapiens

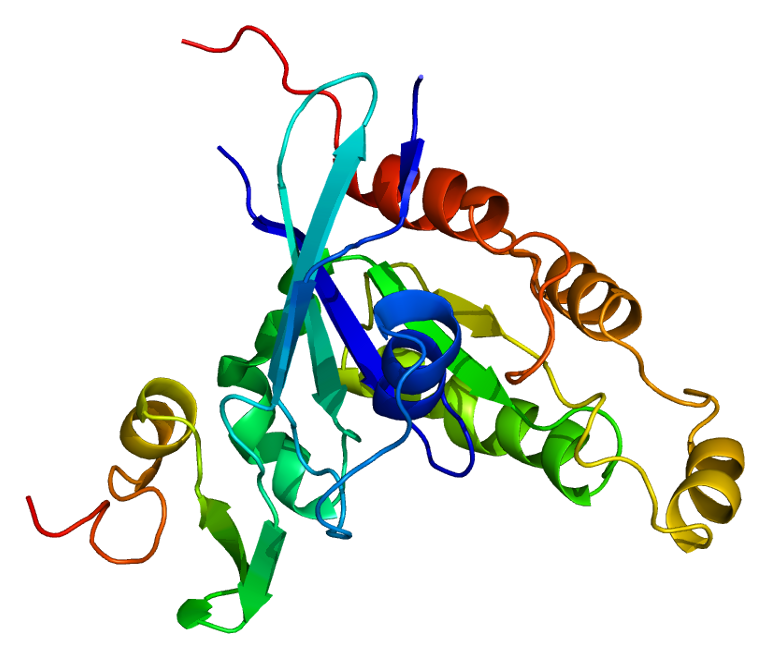

Identifiers
- Aliases: PAK3, CDKN1A, MRX30, MRX47, OPHN3, PAK3beta, bPAK, hPAK-3, beta-PAK, ARA, p21 (RAC1) activated kinase 3, XLID30
- External IDs: OMIM: 300142; MGI: 1339656; GeneCards: PAK3
Available structures
PDB	Ortholog search: PDBe RCSB
PDB	List of PDB id codes 1EES
Enzyme activity
EC #	BRENDA	ExPASy	KEGG	MetaCyc
2.7.11.1	↗	↗	↗	↗

Gene location (Human)
Chr.	X chromosome (human)
Band	Xq23	Start	110,944,285 bp
Band	Xq23	End	111,227,361 bp

Gene location (Mouse)
Chr.	X chromosome (mouse)
Band	X|X F2	Start	142,301,587 bp
Band	X|X F2	End	142,580,792 bp
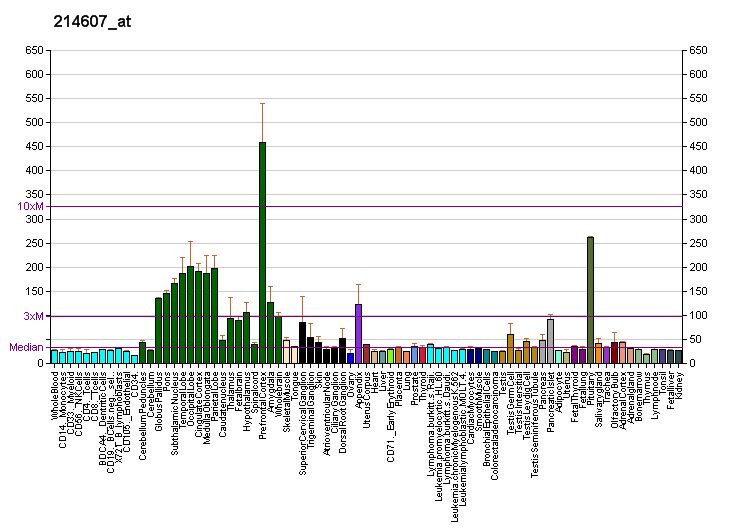
RNA expression pattern
Bgee	Human / Mouse (ortholog); Top expressed in: middle temporal gyrus; Brodmann area 23; endothelial cell; entorhinal cortex; orbitofrontal cortex; postcentral gyrus; Brodmann area 46; superior frontal gyrus; lateral nuclear group of thalamus; Region I of hippocampus proper / Top expressed in: ventromedial nucleus; lateral septal nucleus; Rostral migratory stream; anterior amygdaloid area; arcuate nucleus; ventral tegmental area; lateral hypothalamus; paraventricular nucleus of hypothalamus; dorsomedial hypothalamic nucleus; subiculum; More reference expression data
BioGPS	More reference expression data
Gene ontology
Molecular function	transferase activity; nucleotide binding; protein kinase activity; SH3 domain binding; metal ion binding; kinase activity; protein binding; catalytic activity; GTPase binding; ATP binding; MAP kinase kinase activity; protein serine/threonine kinase activity
Cellular component	cytoplasm; cytosol; endosome; plasma membrane; postsynaptic density; glutamatergic synapse
Biological process	regulation of neuron projection development; phosphorylation; ephrin receptor signaling pathway; dendrite development; T cell costimulation; synapse organization; cellular response to organic cyclic compound; stimulatory C-type lectin receptor signaling pathway; multicellular organism development; protein phosphorylation; regulation of actin filament polymerization; positive regulation of neuron apoptotic process; dendritic spine development; positive regulation of DNA biosynthetic process; metabolism; T cell receptor signaling pathway; positive regulation of dendritic spine morphogenesis; MAPK cascade; regulation of actin cytoskeleton organization; positive regulation of fibroblast migration; dendritic spine morphogenesis; Rho protein signal transduction; regulation of mitotic cell cycle; axonogenesis; cell migration; stress-activated protein kinase signaling cascade; regulation of axonogenesis; regulation of apoptotic process; signal transduction; activation of protein kinase activity; regulation of MAPK cascade
Sources:Amigo / QuickGO
Orthologs
Databases	NCBI: entry; OMA: entry
Species	Human	Mouse
Entrez	5063	18481
Ensembl	ENSG00000077264	ENSMUSG00000031284
UniProt	O75914	Q61036
RefSeq (mRNA)	NM_001128166; NM_001128167; NM_001128168; NM_001128172; NM_001128173 NM_002578; NM_001324325; NM_001324326; NM_001324327; NM_001324328; NM_001324329; NM_001324330; NM_001324331; NM_001324332; NM_001324333; NM_001324334	NM_001195046; NM_001195047; NM_001195048; NM_001195049; NM_008778
RefSeq (protein)	NP_001121638; NP_001121639; NP_001121640; NP_001121644; NP_001121645 NP_001311254; NP_001311255; NP_001311256; NP_001311257; NP_001311258; NP_001311259; NP_001311260; NP_001311261; NP_001311262; NP_001311263; NP_002569	NP_001181975; NP_001181976; NP_001181977; NP_001181978; NP_032804
Location (UCSC)	Chr X: 110.94 – 111.23 Mb	Chr X: 142.3 – 142.58 Mb
PubMed search
- Wikidata
View/Edit Human	View/Edit Mouse

PAK3 (p21-activated kinase 2, beta-PAK) is one of three members of Group I PAK family of evolutionary conserved serine/threonine kinases. PAK3 is preferentially expressed in neuronal cells and involved in synapse formation and plasticity and mental retardation.

== Discovery ==
PAK3 was initially cloned from a murine fibroblast cDNA library and from a murine embryo cDNA library. Like other group I PAKs, PAK3 is stimulated by activated Cdc42 and Rac1.

== Gene and spliced variants ==
The human PAK3 gene, the longest group I family member, is 283-kb long. The PAK3 gene is composed of 22 exons of which 6 exons are for 5'-UTR and generates 13 alternative spliced transcripts. Among PAK3 transcripts, 11 transcripts are for coding proteins ranging from 181- to 580-amino acids long, while remaining two transcripts are non-coding RNAs. The murine PAK3 gene contains 10 transcripts, coding six proteins from 544 amino acids and 559 amino acids long, and four smaller polypeptides from 23 to 366 amino acids.

== Protein domains ==
Similar to PAK1, PAK2 contains a p21-binding domain (PBD) and an auto-inhibitory domain (AID) and exists in an inactive conformation.

== Activators and inhibitors ==
PAK3 activity is stimulated by Dbl, Cdc42 and Cool-2, and by AP1 transcription factor. Stimulation of PAK3 activity by upstream stimulators such as Dbl or Cdc42 is inhibited by p50 (Cool-1) PAK3 activity is inhibited by FRAX597, a PAN inhibitor of PAKs.

== Functions ==
PAK3 is overexpressed in neuroendocrine/carcinoids tumors. PAK3 has been shown to be important for synapse formation and plasticity, and contribute to intellectual disability. Further, every mutations in the PAK3 gene have been associated with nonsyndromic X-linked intellectual disability.
