= RHOBTB3 =

Protein-coding gene in the species Homo sapiens

Identifiers
- Aliases: RHOBTB3, Rho related BTB domain containing 3
- External IDs: OMIM: 607353; MGI: 1920546; GeneCards: RHOBTB3

Gene location (Human)
Chr.	Chromosome 5 (human)
Band	5q15	Start	95,713,522 bp
Band	5q15	End	95,824,383 bp

Gene location (Mouse)
Chr.	Chromosome 13 (mouse)
Band	13|13 C1	Start	76,017,656 bp
Band	13|13 C1	End	76,092,044 bp
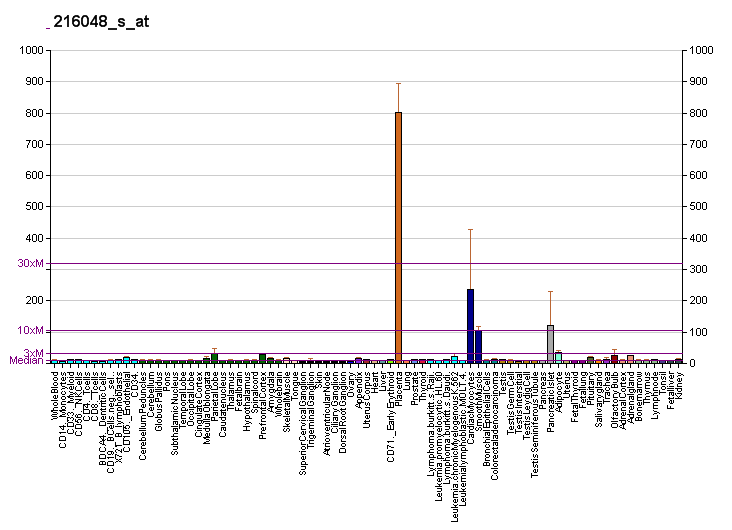

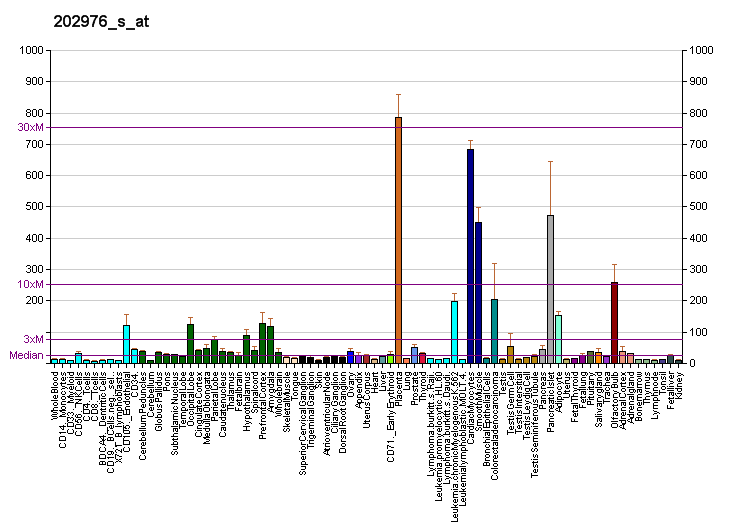

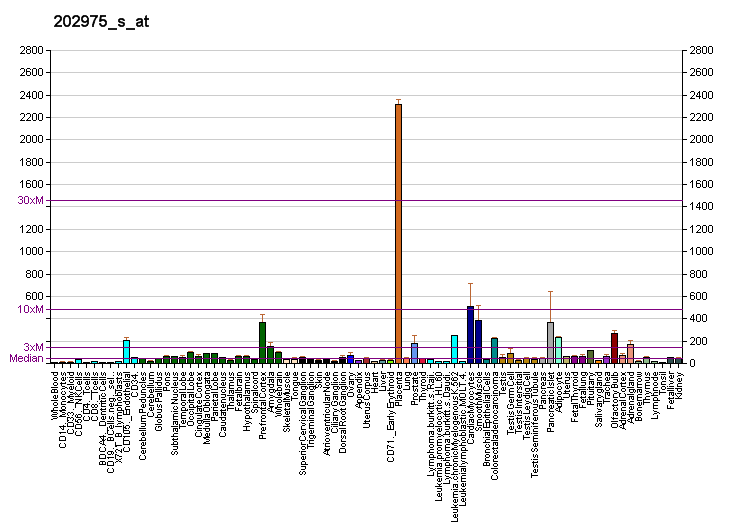
RNA expression pattern
Bgee	Human / Mouse (ortholog); Top expressed in: tibia; retinal pigment epithelium; parotid gland; Achilles tendon; globus pallidus; internal globus pallidus; external globus pallidus; corpus epididymis; placenta; caput epididymis / Top expressed in: hand; sciatic nerve; otolith organ; utricle; seminal vesicula; medial ganglionic eminence; mandibular prominence; maxillary prominence; abdominal wall; vestibular sensory epithelium; More reference expression data
BioGPS	More reference expression data
Gene ontology
Molecular function	nucleotide binding; protein binding; hydrolase activity; ATP binding; ATPase activity; GTPase activity; GTP binding; protein kinase binding
Cellular component	cytoplasm; Golgi apparatus; extracellular exosome; cytosol; trans-Golgi network membrane; plasma membrane; cell cortex; cell projection
Biological process	retrograde transport, endosome to Golgi; vesicle-mediated transport; male gonad development; transport; actin filament organization; establishment or maintenance of cell polarity; Rho protein signal transduction; regulation of cell shape; actin cytoskeleton organization; regulation of actin cytoskeleton organization
Sources:Amigo / QuickGO
Orthologs
Databases	NCBI: entry; OMA: entry
Species	Human	Mouse
Entrez	22836	73296
Ensembl	ENSG00000164292	ENSMUSG00000021589
UniProt	O94955	Q9CTN4
RefSeq (mRNA)	NM_014899	NM_028493
RefSeq (protein)	NP_055714	NP_082769
Location (UCSC)	Chr 5: 95.71 – 95.82 Mb	Chr 13: 76.02 – 76.09 Mb
PubMed search
- Wikidata
View/Edit Human	View/Edit Mouse

Rho-related BTB domain-containing protein 3 is a protein that in humans is encoded by the RHOBTB3 gene.

== Function ==
RHOBTB3 is a member of the evolutionarily conserved RhoBTB subfamily of Rho GTPases. For background information on RHOBTBs, see RHOBTB1 (MIM 607351).[supplied by OMIM]
