= RAC3 =

Protein-coding gene in humans

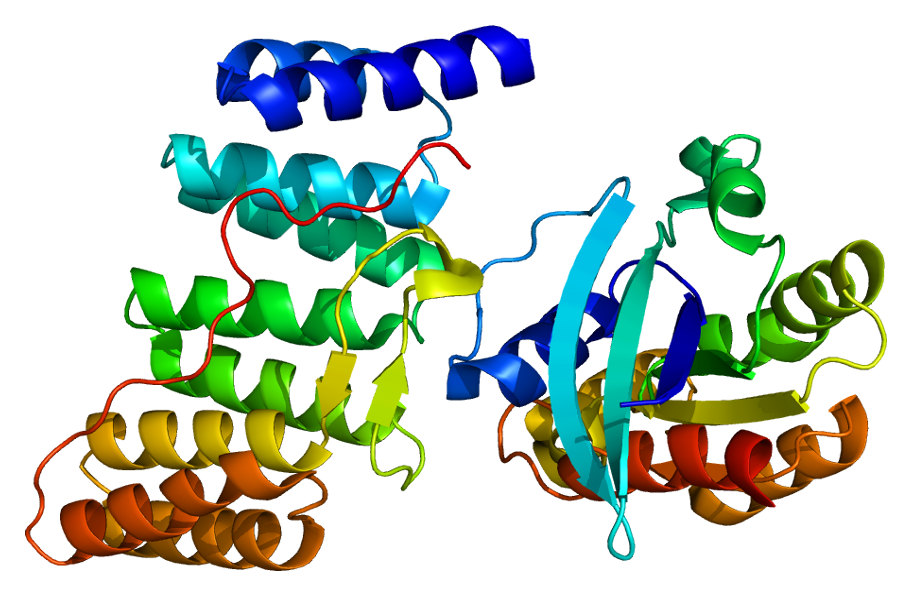

Identifiers
- Aliases: RAC3, ras-related C3 botulinum toxin substrate 3 (rho family, small GTP binding protein Rac3), Rac family small GTPase 3
- External IDs: OMIM: 602050; MGI: 2180784; GeneCards: RAC3
Available structures
PDB	Ortholog search: PDBe RCSB
PDB	List of PDB id codes 2C2H, 2G0N, 2IC5, 2OV2, 2QME
Enzyme activity
EC #	BRENDA	ExPASy	KEGG	MetaCyc
3.6.5.2	↗	↗	↗	↗

Gene location (Human)
Chr.	Chromosome 17 (human)
Band	17q25.3	Start	82,031,678 bp
Band	17q25.3	End	82,034,204 bp

Gene location (Mouse)
Chr.	Chromosome 11 (mouse)
Band	11|11 E2	Start	120,612,296 bp
Band	11|11 E2	End	120,614,795 bp
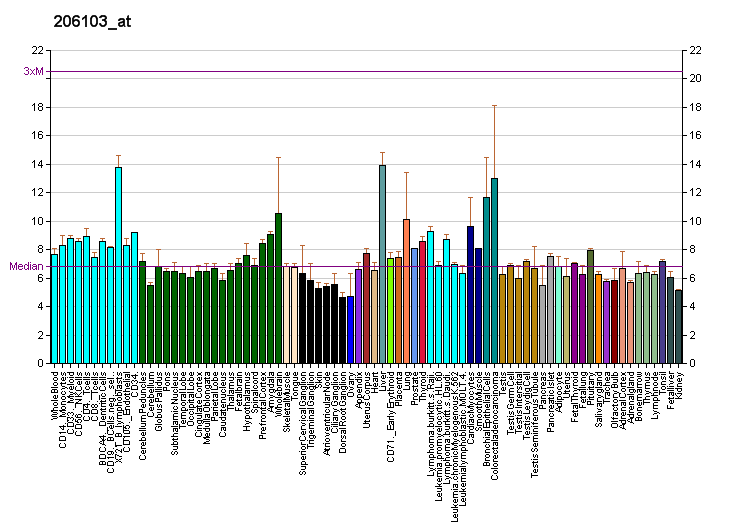
RNA expression pattern
Bgee	Human / Mouse (ortholog); Top expressed in: right hemisphere of cerebellum; ganglionic eminence; ventricular zone; right frontal lobe; right testis; cingulate gyrus; anterior cingulate cortex; left testis; prefrontal cortex; anterior pituitary / Top expressed in: dorsomedial hypothalamic nucleus; lip; dentate gyrus of hippocampal formation granule cell; ventromedial nucleus; neural tube; secondary oocyte; superior frontal gyrus; primary visual cortex; lateral hypothalamus; embryo; More reference expression data
BioGPS	More reference expression data
Gene ontology
Molecular function	nucleotide binding; GTP binding; calcium-dependent protein binding; protein binding; GTPase activity; protein kinase binding
Cellular component	cytoplasm; filamentous actin; cytosol; cell projection; membrane; growth cone; plasma membrane; soma; perinuclear region of cytoplasm; neuron projection; extracellular exosome; cytoskeleton; endomembrane system; cell periphery; lamellipodium; intracellular anatomical structure
Biological process	intracellular signal transduction; neuromuscular process controlling balance; regulation of neuron maturation; synaptic transmission, GABAergic; cerebral cortex GABAergic interneuron development; positive regulation of substrate adhesion-dependent cell spreading; neuromuscular process; cell projection assembly; regulation of cell morphogenesis; homeostasis of number of cells within a tissue; positive regulation of cell adhesion mediated by integrin; neuron projection development; regulation of small GTPase mediated signal transduction; actin cytoskeleton organization; small GTPase mediated signal transduction; cell morphogenesis; actin filament organization; Rho protein signal transduction; cell migration; positive regulation of actin filament polymerization; actin cytoskeleton reorganization; engulfment of apoptotic cell
Sources:Amigo / QuickGO
Orthologs
Databases	NCBI: entry; OMA: entry
Species	Human	Mouse
Entrez	5881	170758
Ensembl	ENSG00000169750	ENSMUSG00000018012
UniProt	P60763	P60764
RefSeq (mRNA)	NM_005052; NM_001316307	NM_133223
RefSeq (protein)	NP_001303236; NP_005043	NP_573486
Location (UCSC)	Chr 17: 82.03 – 82.03 Mb	Chr 11: 120.61 – 120.61 Mb
PubMed search
- Wikidata
View/Edit Human	View/Edit Mouse

Ras-related C3 botulinum toxin substrate 3 (Rac3) is a G protein that in humans is encoded by the RAC3 gene. It is an important component of intracellular signalling pathways. Rac3 is a member of the Rac subfamily of the Rho family of small G proteins. Members of this superfamily appear to regulate a diverse array of cellular events, including the control of cell growth, cytoskeletal reorganization, and the activation of protein kinases.

== Interactions ==
RAC3 has been shown to interact with CIB1 and HNF1A. RAC3 also interacts with Nrf2 proteins. ET_{A}R, ILK, and β-arr1 interact with RAC3 as well.

== Location ==
RAC3 gene is located in the third sub-band of the fifth band in the second region of the q arm on chromosome 17. There are many tumor suppressor genes located around the RAC3 gene.

== Therapeutic use ==
Since the RAC3 gene is over-expressed in carcinoma cells, it can function as a therapeutic target for the treatment of different cancer such as lung adenocarcinoma. To become invasive, epithelial cells have to transform into mesenchymal cells and the transformation is regulated by the RAC3 gene. As a result, if the RAC3 gene is silenced, lung adenocarcinoma cells cannot metastasize. In addition, drugs designed to silence the RAC3 gene lead to the apoptosis of tumor cells, thus preventing the cells from colonizing.

== Pathological mutations ==
Mutations of the RAC3 gene may result in neurodevelopmental disorder with structural brain anomalies and dysmorphic facies, first described in 2018 by White et al.
