= RAC1 =

Protein-coding gene in humans

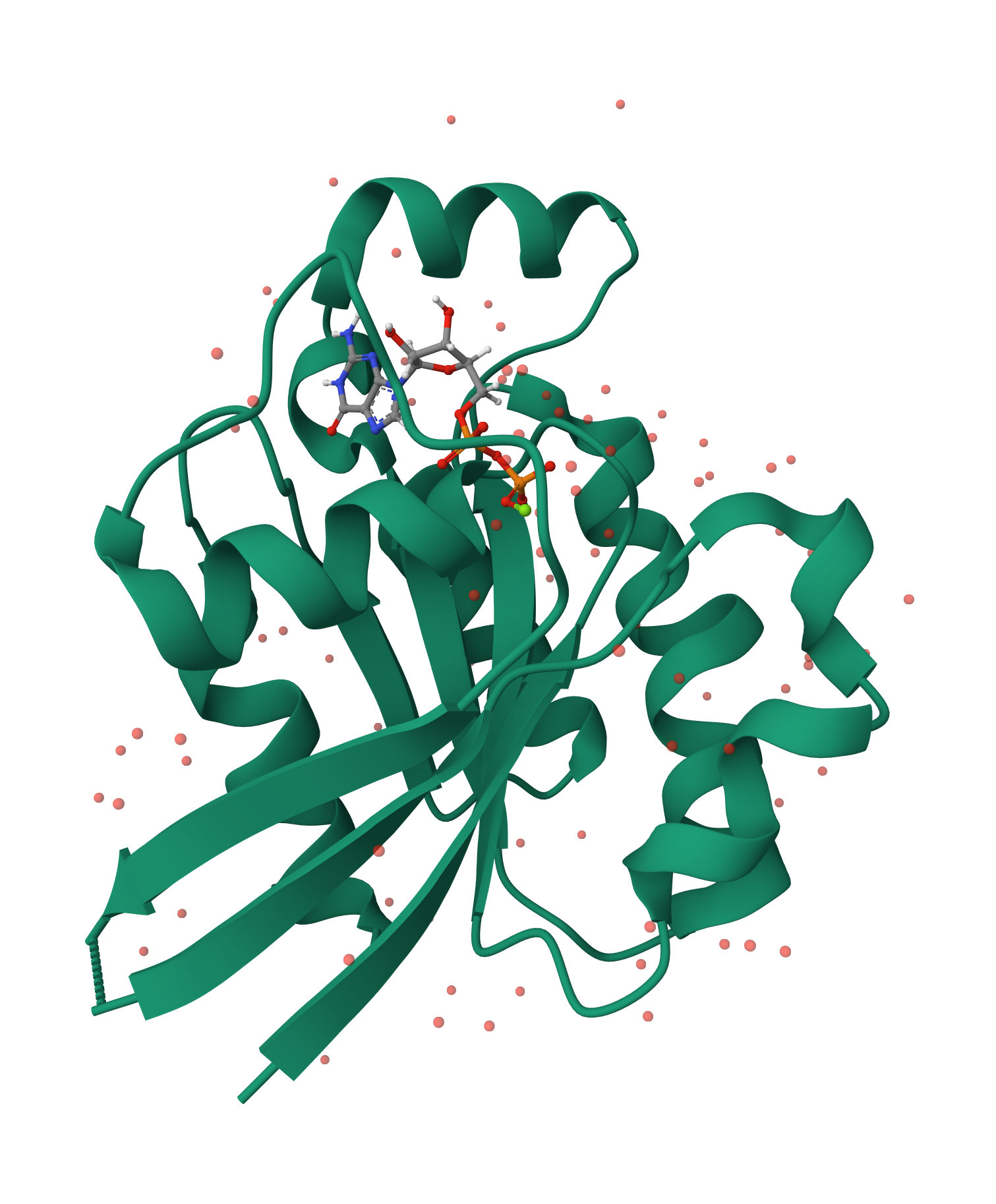

Identifiers
- Aliases: RAC1, MIG5, Rac-1, TC-25, p21-Rac1, ras-related C3 botulinum toxin substrate 1 (rho family, small GTP binding protein Rac1), Rac family small GTPase 1, MRD48
- External IDs: OMIM: 602048; MGI: 97845; GeneCards: RAC1
Available structures
PDB	Ortholog search: PDBe RCSB
PDB	List of PDB id codes 1E96, 1FOE, 1G4U, 1HE1, 1HH4, 1I4D, 1I4L, 1I4T, 1MH1, 1RYF, 1RYH, 2FJU, 2H7V, 2NZ8, 2P2L, 2RMK, 2VRW, 2WKP, 2WKQ, 2WKR, 2YIN, 3B13, 3BJI, 3RYT, 3SBD, 3SBE, 3SU8, 3SUA, 3TH5, 4GZL, 4GZM, 4YON, 5FI0
Enzyme activity
EC #	BRENDA	ExPASy	KEGG	MetaCyc
3.6.5.2	↗	↗	↗	↗

Gene location (Human)
Chr.	Chromosome 7 (human)
Band	7p22.1	Start	6,374,527 bp
Band	7p22.1	End	6,403,967 bp

Gene location (Mouse)
Chr.	Chromosome 5 (mouse)
Band	5 G2|5 82.22 cM	Start	143,489,389 bp
Band	5 G2|5 82.22 cM	End	143,513,791 bp
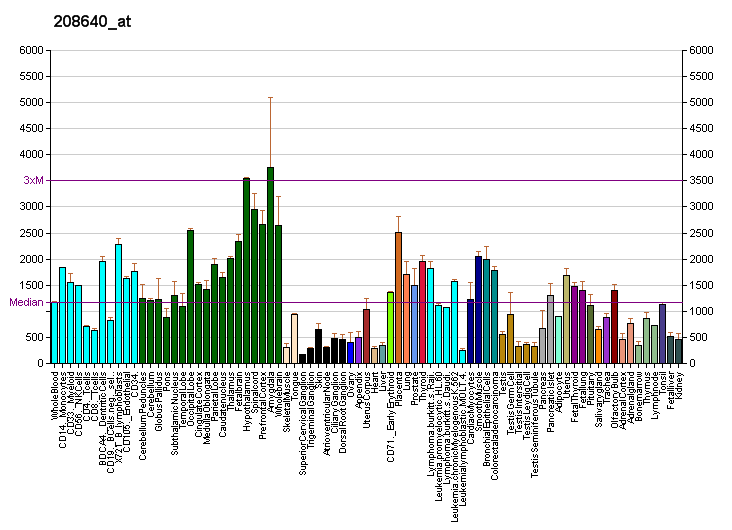

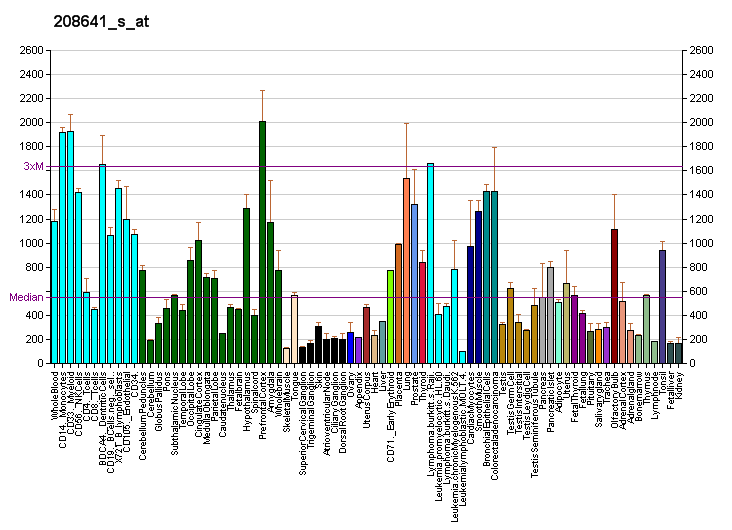
RNA expression pattern
Bgee	Human / Mouse (ortholog); Top expressed in: visceral pleura; middle temporal gyrus; postcentral gyrus; palpebral conjunctiva; gingival epithelium; parietal pleura; Brodmann area 23; entorhinal cortex; Brodmann area 46; Region I of hippocampus proper / Top expressed in: entorhinal cortex; left lung; perirhinal cortex; tail of embryo; CA3 field; triceps brachii muscle; lactiferous gland; choroid plexus of fourth ventricle; left lung lobe; molar; More reference expression data
BioGPS	More reference expression data
Gene ontology
Molecular function	histone deacetylase binding; Rho GDP-dissociation inhibitor binding; GTP-dependent protein binding; GTPase activity; enzyme binding; protein binding; thioesterase binding; protein kinase binding; nucleotide binding; GTP binding; protein serine/threonine kinase activity; protein-containing complex binding; phosphatidylinositol-4,5-bisphosphate 3-kinase activity; ATPase binding
Cellular component	cytoplasm; cytosol; membrane; focal adhesion; melanosome; ruffle membrane; trans-Golgi network; nucleus; cell projection; extrinsic component of plasma membrane; extracellular exosome; lamellipodium; early endosome membrane; plasma membrane; actin filament; cytoplasmic ribonucleoprotein granule; endoplasmic reticulum membrane; Golgi membrane; phagocytic cup; cytoplasmic vesicle; extracellular matrix; secretory granule membrane; dendritic spine; recycling endosome membrane; postsynapse; glutamatergic synapse; ficolin-1-rich granule membrane
Biological process	positive regulation of Rho protein signal transduction; regulation of respiratory burst; non-canonical Wnt signaling pathway; positive regulation of protein phosphorylation; positive regulation of actin filament polymerization; regulation of neuron maturation; negative regulation of receptor-mediated endocytosis; platelet activation; Fc-epsilon receptor signaling pathway; cellular response to mechanical stimulus; phagocytosis, engulfment; vascular endothelial growth factor receptor signaling pathway; substrate adhesion-dependent cell spreading; cell population proliferation; ruffle assembly; lamellipodium assembly; dopaminergic neuron differentiation; cell-cell junction organization; Fc-gamma receptor signaling pathway involved in phagocytosis; ruffle organization; actin filament organization; cell motility; anatomical structure morphogenesis; bone resorption; response to wounding; protein localization to plasma membrane; inflammatory response; regulation of small GTPase mediated signal transduction; positive regulation of cell-substrate adhesion; G protein-coupled receptor signaling pathway; neuron projection morphogenesis; epithelial cell morphogenesis; dendrite morphogenesis; regulation of hydrogen peroxide metabolic process; engulfment of apoptotic cell; dendrite development; auditory receptor cell morphogenesis; hyperosmotic response; cerebral cortex GABAergic interneuron development; chemotaxis; positive regulation of DNA replication; actin filament polymerization; cell adhesion; negative regulation of interleukin-23 production; homeostasis of number of cells within a tissue; cell-matrix adhesion; localization within membrane; actin cytoskeleton organization; regulation of cell size; anatomical structure arrangement; intracellular signal transduction; regulation of cell migration; endocytosis; ephrin receptor signaling pathway; T cell costimulation; blood coagulation; mitigation of host defenses by virus; synaptic transmission, GABAergic; mast cell chemotaxis; positive regulation of phosphatidylinositol 3-kinase activity; positive regulation of substrate adhesion-dependent cell spreading; embryonic olfactory bulb interneuron precursor migration; cytoskeleton organization; cochlea morphogenesis; positive regulation of neutrophil chemotaxis; positive regulation of apoptotic process; regulation of cell morphogenesis; positive regulation of focal adhesion assembly; regulation of fibroblast migration; positive regulation of lamellipodium assembly; cerebral cortex radially oriented cell migration; cell migration; semaphorin-plexin signaling pathway; positive regulation of stress fiber assembly; axon guidance; small GTPase mediated signal transduction; positive regulation of GTPase activity; Wnt signaling pathway, planar cell polarity pathway; midbrain dopaminergic neuron differentiation; neuron migration; protein phosphorylation; Rho protein signal transduction; regulation of lamellipodium assembly; Rac protein signal transduction; cell projection assembly; positive regulation of microtubule polymerization; neutrophil degranulation; regulation of nitric oxide biosynthetic process; phosphatidylinositol phosphate biosynthetic process; hepatocyte growth factor receptor signaling pathway; regulation of stress fiber assembly; positive regulation of protein kinase B signaling; motor neuron axon guidance; regulation of neutrophil migration; positive regulation of insulin secretion involved in cellular response to glucose stimulus
Sources:Amigo / QuickGO
Orthologs
Databases	NCBI: entry; OMA: entry
Species	Human	Mouse
Entrez	5879	19353
Ensembl	ENSG00000136238	ENSMUSG00000001847
UniProt	P63000	P63001
RefSeq (mRNA)	NM_198829; NM_006908; NM_018890	NM_009007; NM_001347530
RefSeq (protein)	NP_008839; NP_061485	NP_001334459; NP_033033
Location (UCSC)	Chr 7: 6.37 – 6.4 Mb	Chr 5: 143.49 – 143.51 Mb
PubMed search
- Wikidata
View/Edit Human	View/Edit Mouse

Ras-related C3 botulinum toxin substrate 1, is a protein that in humans is encoded by the RAC1 gene. This gene can produce a variety of alternatively spliced versions of the Rac1 protein, which appear to carry out different functions.

== Function ==
Rac1 is a small (~21 kDa) signalling G protein (more specifically a GTPase), and is a member of the Rac subfamily of the family Rho family of GTPases. Members of this superfamily appear to regulate a diverse array of cellular events, including the control of GLUT4 translocation to glucose uptake, cell growth, cytoskeletal reorganization, antimicrobial cytotoxicity, and the activation of protein kinases.

Rac1 is a pleiotropic regulator of many cellular processes, including the cell cycle, cell-cell adhesion, motility (through the actin network), and of epithelial differentiation (proposed to be necessary for maintaining epidermal stem cells).

=== Role in glucose transport ===
Rac1 is expressed in significant amounts in insulin sensitive tissues, such as adipose tissue and skeletal muscle. Here Rac1 regulated the translocation of glucose transporting GLUT4 vesicles from intracellular compartments to the plasma membrane. In response to insulin, this allows for blood glucose to enter the cell to lower blood glucose. In conditions of obesity and type 2 diabetes, Rac1 signalling in skeletal muscle is dysfunctional, suggesting that Rac1 contributes to the progression of the disease. Rac1 protein is also necessary for glucose uptake in skeletal muscle activated by exercise and muscle stretching.

== Clinical significance ==
=== Cancer ===
Along with other subfamily of Rac and Rho proteins, they exert an important regulatory role specifically in cell motility and cell growth. Rac1 has ubiquitous tissue expression, and drives cell motility by formation of lamellipodia. In order for cancer cells to grow and invade local and distant tissues, deregulation of cell motility is one of the hallmark events in cancer cell invasion and metastasis. Overexpression of a constitutively active Rac1 V12 in mice caused a tumour that is phenotypically indistinguishable from human Kaposi's sarcoma. Activating or gain-of-function mutations of Rac1 are shown to play active roles in promoting mesenchymal-type of cell movement assisted by NEDD9 and DOCK3 protein complex. Such abnormal cell motility may result in epithelial mesenchymal transition (EMT) – a driving mechanism for tumour metastasis as well as drug-resistant tumour relapse.

Activating mutations in Rac1 have been recently discovered in large-scale genomic studies involving melanoma and non-small cell lung cancer. As a result, Rac1 is considered a therapeutic target for many of these diseases.

=== Other diseases ===
Dominant negative or constitutively active germline RAC1 mutations cause diverse phenotypes that have been grouped together as Mental Retardation Type 48. Most mutations cause microcephaly while some specific changes appear to result in macrocephaly.

=== As a drug target ===
A few recent studies have also exploited targeted therapy to suppress tumour growth by pharmacological inhibition of Rac1 activity in metastatic melanoma and liver cancer as well as in human breast cancer. For example, Rac1-dependent pathway inhibition resulted in the reversal of tumour cell phenotypes, suggesting Rac1 as a predictive marker and therapeutic target for trastuzumab-resistant breast cancer. However, given Rac1's role in glucose transport, drugs that inhibit Rac1 could potentially be harmful to glucose homeostasis.

== Interactions ==
RAC1 has been shown to interact with:

- ARFIP2,
- ARHGDIA,
- BAIAP2,
- FHOD1,
- FMNL1,
- IQGAP1,
- IQGAP2,
- Myd88,
- DMPK,
- NCKAP1,
- PAK1,
- PAK3,
- PARD6A,
- PARD6B,
- RICS
- STAT3, and
- TIAM1.
