= A-1,6-mannosyl-glycoprotein 6-b-N-acetylglucosaminyltransferase =

Class of enzymes

Alpha-1,6-mannosyl-glycoprotein 6-beta-N-acetylglucosaminyltransferase

Identifiers
- EC no.: 2.4.1.155
- CAS no.: 83588-90-3

Databases
- IntEnz: IntEnz view
- BRENDA: BRENDA entry
- ExPASy: NiceZyme view
- KEGG: KEGG entry
- MetaCyc: metabolic pathway
- PRIAM: profile
- PDB structures: RCSB PDB PDBe PDBsum
Search
- PMC: articles
- PubMed: articles
- NCBI: proteins

Alpha-1,6-mannosyl-glycoprotein 6-beta-N-acetylglucosaminyltransferase (EC 2.4.1.155, N-acetylglucosaminyltransferase V, alpha-mannoside beta-1,6-N-acetylglucosaminyltransferase, uridine diphosphoacetylglucosamine-alpha-mannoside beta1->6-acetylglucosaminyltransferase, UDP-N-acetylglucosamine:alpha-mannoside-beta1,6 N-acetylglucosaminyltransferase, alpha-1,3(6)-mannosylglycoprotein beta-1,6-N-acetylglucosaminyltransferase, GnTV) is an enzyme with systematic name UDP-N-acetyl-D-glucosamine:6-(2-(N-acetyl-beta-D-glucosaminyl)-alpha-D-mannosyl)-glycoprotein 6-beta-N-acetyl-D-glucosaminyltransferase. This enzyme catalyses the following chemical reaction

UDP-N-acetyl-D-glucosamine + 6-(2-[N-acetyl-beta-D-glucosaminyl]-alpha-D-mannosyl)-beta-D-mannosyl-R $\rightleftharpoons$ UDP + 6-(2,6-bis[N-acetyl-beta-D-glucosaminyl]-alpha-D-mannosyl)-beta-D-mannosyl-R

R represents the remainder of the N-linked oligosaccharide in the glycoprotein acceptor.
