= ARHGDIG =

Protein-coding gene in the species Homo sapiens

Identifiers
- Aliases: ARHGDIG, RHOGDI-3, Rho GDP dissociation inhibitor gamma
- External IDs: OMIM: 602844; MGI: 108430; GeneCards: ARHGDIG

Gene location (Human)
Chr.	Chromosome 16 (human)
Band	16p13.3	Start	280,450 bp
Band	16p13.3	End	283,010 bp

Gene location (Mouse)
Chr.	Chromosome 17 (mouse)
Band	17|17 A3.3	Start	26,418,157 bp
Band	17|17 A3.3	End	26,426,760 bp
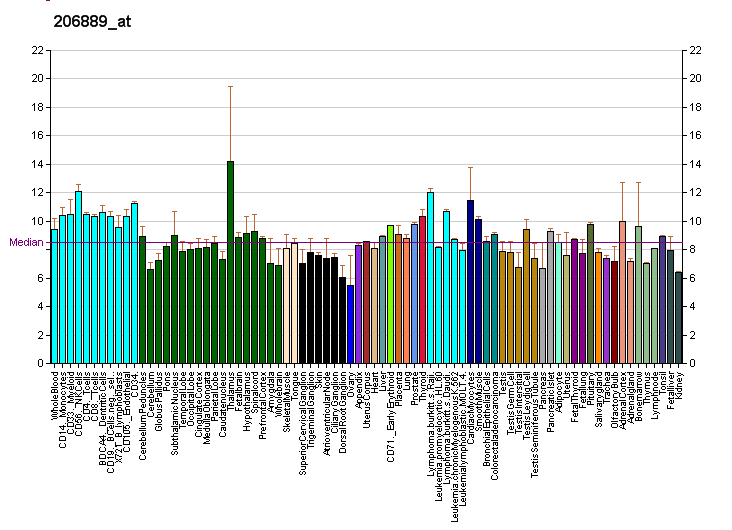

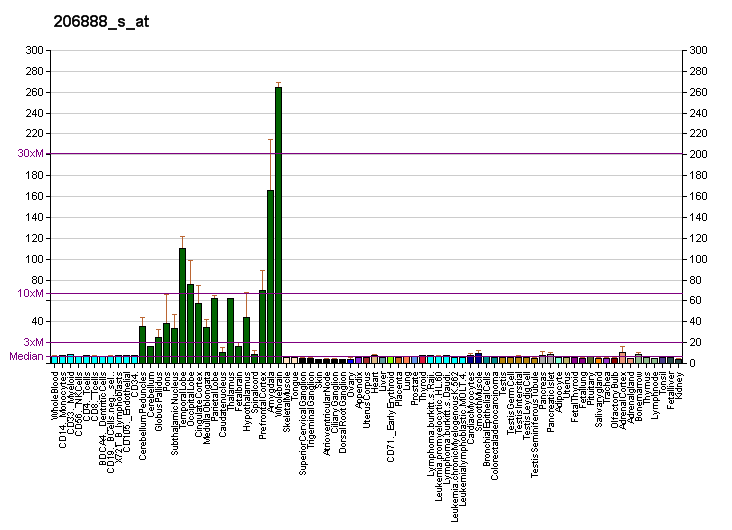
RNA expression pattern
Bgee	Human / Mouse (ortholog); Top expressed in: right hemisphere of cerebellum; right frontal lobe; body of pancreas; cingulate gyrus; anterior cingulate cortex; Brodmann area 9; amygdala; prefrontal cortex; nucleus accumbens; gonad / Top expressed in: nasal epithelium; olfactory epithelium; superior frontal gyrus; dentate gyrus of hippocampal formation granule cell; stomach; primary visual cortex; olfactory bulb; prefrontal cortex; neural tube; striatum of neuraxis; More reference expression data
BioGPS	More reference expression data
Gene ontology
Molecular function	GDP-dissociation inhibitor activity; Rho GDP-dissociation inhibitor activity; protein binding; GTPase regulator activity; GTPase activator activity
Cellular component	cytoplasm; membrane; cytoplasmic vesicle; cytosol; plasma membrane
Biological process	negative regulation of cell adhesion; positive regulation of GTPase activity; regulation of catalytic activity; regulation of small GTPase mediated signal transduction; Rho protein signal transduction; regulation of protein localization; blastocyst hatching
Sources:Amigo / QuickGO
Orthologs
Databases	NCBI: entry; OMA: entry
Species	Human	Mouse
Entrez	398	14570
Ensembl	ENSG00000242173	ENSMUSG00000073433
UniProt	Q99819	Q62160
RefSeq (mRNA)	NM_001176	NM_008113
RefSeq (protein)	NP_001167	NP_032139
Location (UCSC)	Chr 16: 0.28 – 0.28 Mb	Chr 17: 26.42 – 26.43 Mb
PubMed search
- Wikidata
View/Edit Human	View/Edit Mouse

Rho GDP-dissociation inhibitor 3 is a protein that in humans is encoded by the ARHGDIG gene.

== Interactions ==
ARHGDIG has been shown to interact with RHOB.
