= ARHGDIA =

Protein-coding gene in the species Homo sapiens

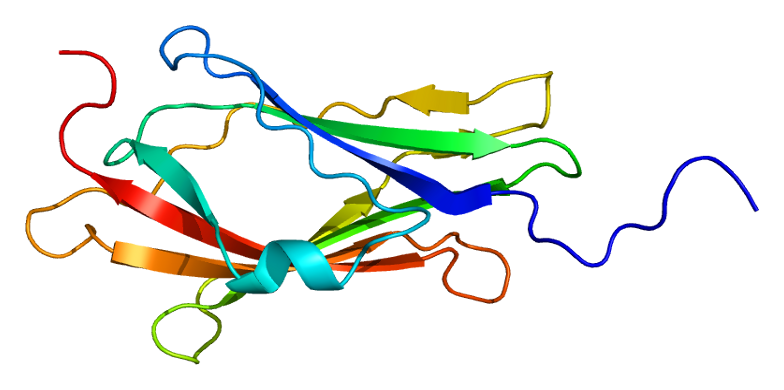

Identifiers
- Aliases: ARHGDIA, GDIA1, HEL-S-47e, NPHS8, RHOGDI, RHOGDI-1, Rho GDP dissociation inhibitor alpha
- External IDs: OMIM: 601925; MGI: 2178103; GeneCards: ARHGDIA
Available structures
| PDB | Ortholog search: PDBe RCSB |
| PDB | List of PDB id codes 1CC0, 1FSO, 1FST, 1FT0, 1FT3, 1HH4, 1KMT, 1QVY, 1RHO, 2BXW, 2JHS, 2JHT, 2JHU, 2JHV, 2JHW, 2JHX, 2JHY, 2JHZ, 2JI0, 2N80 |

Gene location (Human)
| Chr. | Chromosome 17 (human) |
| Band | 17q25.3 | Start | 81,867,721 bp |
| Band | 17q25.3 | End | 81,871,378 bp |

Gene location (Mouse)
| Chr. | Chromosome 11 (mouse) |
| Band | 11|11 E2 | Start | 120,468,930 bp |
| Band | 11|11 E2 | End | 120,472,450 bp |
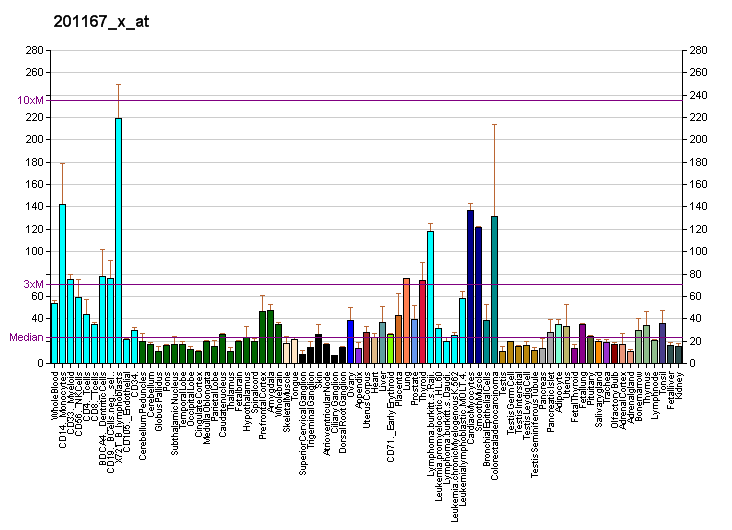

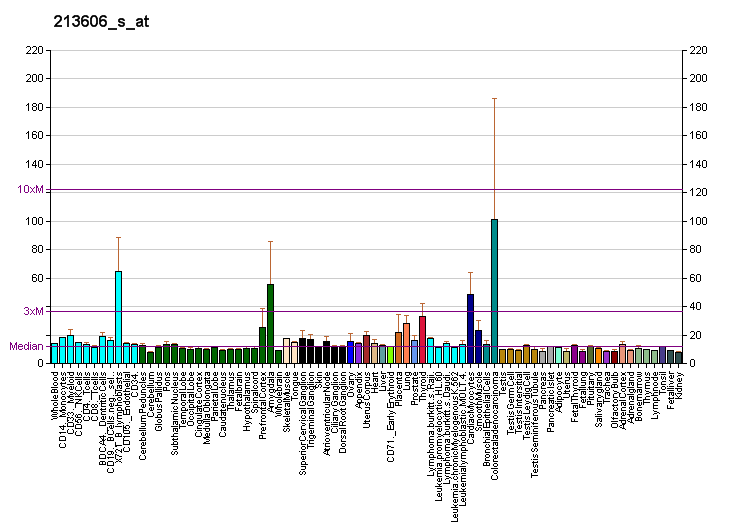

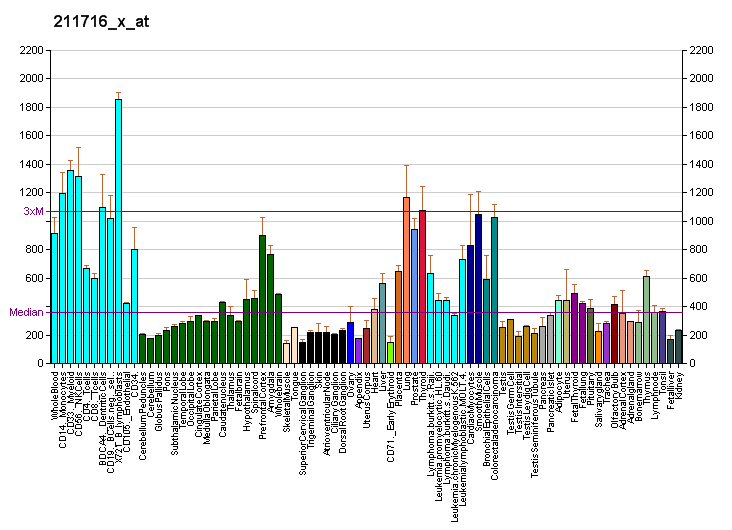
RNA expression pattern
| Bgee | Human / Mouse (ortholog); Top expressed in: granulocyte; epithelium of colon; mucosa of transverse colon; left uterine tube; upper lobe of left lung; right lung; ascending aorta; left coronary artery; tibial nerve; anterior pituitary / Top expressed in: tail of embryo; yolk sac; genital tubercle; tibiofemoral joint; lip; lactiferous gland; entorhinal cortex; mesenteric lymph nodes; perirhinal cortex; molar; More reference expression data |
| BioGPS | More reference expression data |
Gene ontology
| Molecular function | GTPase activator activity; Rho GDP-dissociation inhibitor activity; protein binding |
| Cellular component | cytoplasm; cytosol; extracellular exosome; cytoskeleton; membrane |
| Biological process | negative regulation of cell adhesion; regulation of actin cytoskeleton reorganization; negative regulation of apoptotic process; positive regulation of axonogenesis; positive regulation of GTPase activity; negative regulation of axonogenesis; regulation of Rho protein signal transduction; regulation of small GTPase mediated signal transduction; semaphorin-plexin signaling pathway; regulation of catalytic activity; Rho protein signal transduction |
Sources:Amigo / QuickGO
Orthologs
| Databases | NCBI: entry; OMA: entry |
| Species | Human | Mouse |
| Entrez | 396 | 192662 |
| Ensembl | ENSG00000141522 | ENSMUSG00000025132 |
| UniProt | P52565 | Q99PT1 |
| RefSeq (mRNA) | NM_001185077; NM_001185078; NM_001301240; NM_001301241; NM_001301242 NM_001301243; NM_004309 | NM_133796; NM_001363425 |
| RefSeq (protein) | NP_001172006; NP_001172007; NP_001288169; NP_001288170; NP_001288171 NP_001288172; NP_004300 | NP_598557; NP_001350354 |
| Location (UCSC) | Chr 17: 81.87 – 81.87 Mb | Chr 11: 120.47 – 120.47 Mb |
| PubMed search |
- Wikidata
| View/Edit Human | View/Edit Mouse |

Rho GDP-dissociation inhibitor 1 is a protein that in humans is encoded by the ARHGDIA gene.

== Interactions ==
ARHGDIA has been shown to interact with:

- CDC42,
- RAC1,
- RHOA,
- Rac2, and
- RhoH.
