= RHOBTB1 =

Protein-coding gene in the species Homo sapiens

Identifiers
- Aliases: RHOBTB1, Rho related BTB domain containing 1
- External IDs: OMIM: 607351; MGI: 1916538; GeneCards: RHOBTB1
Enzyme activity
EC #	BRENDA	ExPASy	KEGG	MetaCyc
3.6.5.2	↗	↗	↗	↗

Gene location (Human)
Chr.	Chromosome 10 (human)
Band	10q21.2	Start	60,869,438 bp
Band	10q21.2	End	61,001,440 bp

Gene location (Mouse)
Chr.	Chromosome 10 (mouse)
Band	10|10 B5.3	Start	68,987,264 bp
Band	10|10 B5.3	End	69,127,621 bp
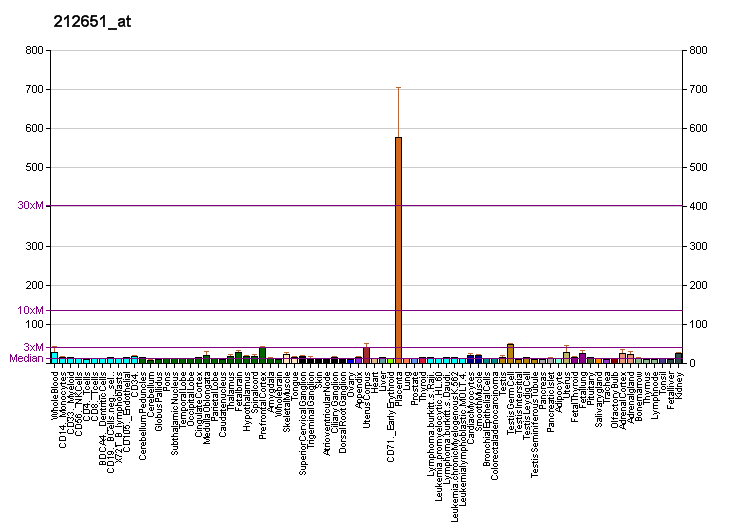
RNA expression pattern
Bgee	Human / Mouse (ortholog); Top expressed in: vastus lateralis muscle; Skeletal muscle tissue of rectus abdominis; Achilles tendon; muscle of thigh; biceps brachii; right uterine tube; placenta; Skeletal muscle tissue of biceps brachii; cardia; glutes / Top expressed in: myocardium of ventricle; internal carotid artery; cumulus cell; aortic valve; ascending aorta; external carotid artery; ureter; islet of Langerhans; otolith organ; utricle; More reference expression data
BioGPS	More reference expression data
Gene ontology
Molecular function	nucleotide binding; GTP binding; GTPase activity; protein kinase binding
Cellular component	cytosol; plasma membrane; intracellular anatomical structure; cytoplasm; cytoskeleton; cell projection
Biological process	regulation of small GTPase mediated signal transduction; small GTPase mediated signal transduction; cell morphogenesis; actin filament organization; Rho protein signal transduction; cell migration; actin cytoskeleton organization; positive regulation of actin filament polymerization; actin cytoskeleton reorganization; engulfment of apoptotic cell
Sources:Amigo / QuickGO
Orthologs
Databases	NCBI: entry; OMA: entry
Species	Human	Mouse
Entrez	9886	69288
Ensembl	ENSG00000072422	ENSMUSG00000019944
UniProt	O94844	Q9DAK3
RefSeq (mRNA)	NM_001242359; NM_014836; NM_001350902; NM_001350903; NM_001350904 NM_001350905; NM_001350906; NM_001350907; NM_001350908; NM_001350909; NM_001350910; NM_001350911	NM_001081347; NM_001252636; NM_001252637; NM_001252638
RefSeq (protein)	NP_001229288; NP_055651; NP_001337831; NP_001337832; NP_001337833 NP_001337834; NP_001337835; NP_001337836; NP_001337837; NP_001337838; NP_001337839; NP_001337840; NP_001229288.1; NP_055651.1	NP_001074816; NP_001239565; NP_001239566; NP_001239567
Location (UCSC)	Chr 10: 60.87 – 61 Mb	Chr 10: 68.99 – 69.13 Mb
PubMed search
- Wikidata
View/Edit Human	View/Edit Mouse

Rho-related BTB domain-containing protein 1 is a protein that in humans is encoded by the RHOBTB1 gene.

The protein encoded by this gene belongs to the Rho family, which is part of the Ras superfamily of small GTPases. It contains a GTPase domain, a proline-rich region, two tandem BTB (broad complex, tramtrack, and bric-à-brac) domains, and a conserved C-terminal region. This protein plays a role in small GTPase-mediated signal transduction and in the organization of the actin filament system. Alternative transcriptional splice variants of this gene have been characterized.
