= Rac (GTPase) =

Subfamily of the Rho family of GTPases

Rac is a subfamily of the Rho family of GTPases, small (~21 kDa) signaling G proteins (more specifically a GTPase). Just as other G proteins, Rac acts as a molecular switch, remaining inactive while bound to guanosine diphosphate (GDP) and activated once guanine nucleotide exchange factors (GEFs) remove GDP, permitting guanosine triphosphate (GTP) to bind. When bound to GTP, Rac is activated. In its activated state, Rac participates in the regulation of cell movement, through its involvement in structural changes to the actin cytoskeleton. By changing the cytoskeletal dynamics within the cell, Rac-GTPases are able to facilitate the recruitment of neutrophils to the infected tissues, and to regulate degranulation of azurophil and integrin-dependent phagocytosis.

Activated Rac also regulates the effector functions of the target proteins involved in downstream signaling. As an essential subunit of NOX2 (NADPH oxidase enzyme complex), Rac is required for ROS (reactive oxygen species) production involved in the formation of NETs (neutrophil extracellular traps, thus, facilitating the pathogen and debris clearance by neutrophils, and the reduction of inflammation.

The abnormal activities of Rac including its hyperactivation, resistance to degradation, and abnormal localization of its signaling protein components were found to facilitate the development of cancerous cells and resist to anticancer treatment.

Recent experiments on Drosophila suggest that Rac could be involved in mediating the process of forgetting. Hyperactivation of Rac increases memory decay whereas its inhibition prevents interference-induced forgetting and slows down passive memory decay.

== Classification ==
The Rho family of GTPases includes Rac, Rho, and Cdc42 small G-protein groups. Rac comprises Rac1, Rac2, Rac3, and RhoG subgroups.

The extensive cross-talk within these groups of GTPase provides a significant impact on the biological responses of the cell, influencing the activity of the cell cycle machinery. Ras cooperates with Cdc42 to regulate Elk1 phosphorylation and transcriptional activity of SRF. Ras also cooperates with Rho and Ras to activate other downstream signaling pathways.
