= Cortactin =

Protein found in humans

CTTN
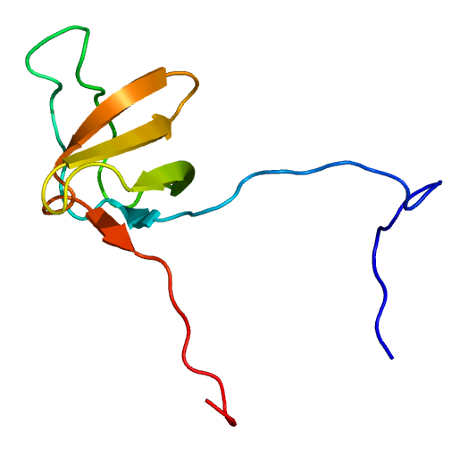

Identifiers
- Aliases: CTTN, EMS1, cortactin
- External IDs: OMIM: 164765; MGI: 99695; GeneCards: CTTN
Available structures
| PDB | Ortholog search: PDBe RCSB |
| PDB | List of PDB id codes 1X69, 2D1X |

Gene location (Human)
| Chr. | Chromosome 11 (human) |
| Band | 11q13.3 | Start | 70,398,404 bp |
| Band | 11q13.3 | End | 70,436,584 bp |

Gene location (Mouse)
| Chr. | Chromosome 7 (mouse) |
| Band | 7|7 F5 | Start | 143,989,470 bp |
| Band | 7|7 F5 | End | 144,024,746 bp |
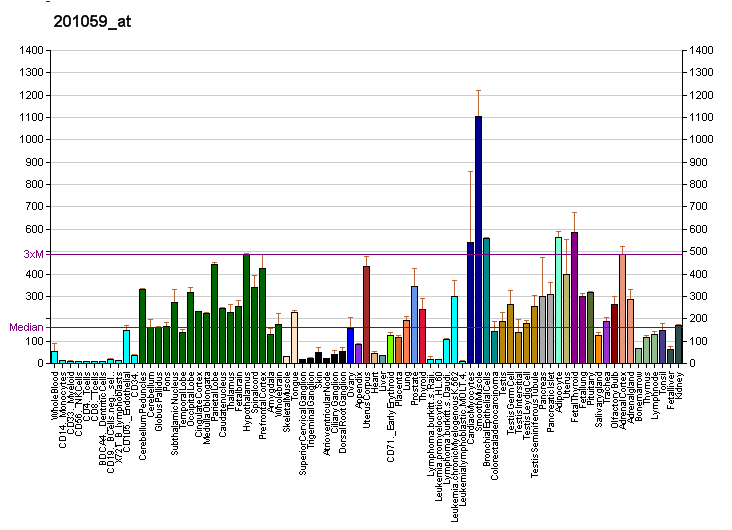

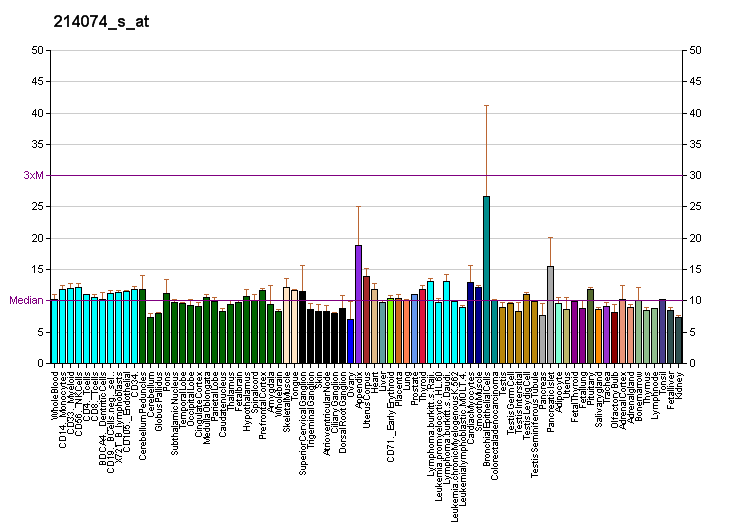
RNA expression pattern
| Bgee | Human / Mouse (ortholog); Top expressed in: stromal cell of endometrium; body of uterus; left ovary; right ovary; right adrenal cortex; myometrium; gastric mucosa; right uterine tube; canal of the cervix; left adrenal cortex / Top expressed in: medullary collecting duct; transitional epithelium of urinary bladder; gastrula; endothelial cell of lymphatic vessel; cumulus cell; calvaria; Paneth cell; epithelium of stomach; renal corpuscle; tail of embryo; More reference expression data |
| BioGPS | More reference expression data |
Gene ontology
| Molecular function | profilin binding; protein binding; cadherin binding |
| Cellular component | cytoplasm; Golgi apparatus; cell projection; intracellular membrane-bounded organelle; membrane; focal adhesion; growth cone; ruffle; voltage-gated potassium channel complex; cortical cytoskeleton; plasma membrane; dendritic spine; mitotic spindle midzone; cell junction; dendrite; cell cortex; actin filament; podosome; clathrin-coated pit; extracellular exosome; cytoskeleton; lamellipodium; cytosol |
| Biological process | actin cytoskeleton reorganization; neuron projection morphogenesis; endocytosis; positive regulation of actin filament polymerization; regulation of axon extension; cell motility; substrate-dependent cell migration, cell extension; negative regulation of extrinsic apoptotic signaling pathway; receptor-mediated endocytosis; dendritic spine maintenance; focal adhesion assembly; actin filament polymerization; regulation of autophagy of mitochondrion; lamellipodium organization; intracellular protein transport; positive regulation of smooth muscle contraction; membrane organization |
Sources:Amigo / QuickGO
Orthologs
| Databases | NCBI: entry; OMA: entry |
| Species | Human | Mouse |
| Entrez | 2017 | 13043 |
| Ensembl | ENSG00000085733; ENSG00000288401 | ENSMUSG00000031078 |
| UniProt | Q14247 | Q60598 |
| RefSeq (mRNA) | NM_001184740; NM_005231; NM_138565 | NM_001252572; NM_007803; NM_001357116 |
| RefSeq (protein) | NP_001171669; NP_005222; NP_612632 | NP_001239501; NP_031829; NP_001344045 |
| Location (UCSC) | Chr 11: 70.4 – 70.44 Mb | Chr 7: 143.99 – 144.02 Mb |
| PubMed search |
- Wikidata
| View/Edit Human | View/Edit Mouse |

Cortactin (from "cortical actin binding protein") is a monomeric protein located in the cytoplasm of cells that can be activated by external stimuli to promote polymerization and rearrangement of the actin cytoskeleton, especially the actin cortex around the cellular periphery. It is present in all cell types. When activated, it will recruit Arp2/3 complex proteins to existing actin microfilaments, facilitating and stabilizing nucleation sites for actin branching. Cortactin is important in promoting lamellipodia formation, invadopodia formation, cell migration, and endocytosis.

== Gene ==
In humans, cortactin is encoded by the CTTN gene on chromosome 11.

== Structure ==
Cortactin is a thin, elongated monomer that consists of an amino-terminal acidic (NTA) region; 37-residue-long segments that are highly conserved among cortactin proteins of all species and repeated up to 6.5 times in tandem (“cortactin repeats”); a proline-rich region; and an SH3 domain. This basic structure is highly conserved among all species that express cortactin.

== Activation and binding ==
Cortactin is activated via phosphorylation, by tyrosine kinases or serine/threonine kinases, in response to extracellular signals like growth factors, adhesion sites, or pathogenic invasion of the epithelial layer.

The SH3 domain of certain tyrosine kinases, such as the oncogene Src kinase, binds to cortactin's proline-rich region and phosphorylates it on Tyr421, Tyr466, and Tyr482. Once activated in this way, it can bind to filamentous actin (F-actin) with the fourth of its cortactin repeats. As the concentration of phosphorylated cortactin increases in specific regions within the cell, the monomers each begin to recruit an Arp2/3 complex to F-actin. It binds to Arp2/3 with an aspartic acid-aspartic acid-tryptophan (DDW) sequence in its NTA region, a motif that is often seen in other actin nucleation-promoting factors (NPFs).

Certain serine/threonine kinases, such as ERK, can phosphorylate cortactin on Ser405 and Ser418 in the SH3 domain. Activated like this, it still associates with Arp2/3 and F-actin, but will also allow other actin NPFs, most importantly N-WASp (Neuronal Wiskott-Aldrich syndrome protein), to bind to the complex as well; when phosphorylated by tyrosine kinases, other NPFs are excluded. The ability of these other NPFs to bind the Arp2/3 complex while cortactin is also bound could come from new interactions with cortactin's SH3 domain, which is in a different conformation when phosphorylated by Ser/Thr kinases and thus may be more open to interactions with other NPFs. Having other NPFs bind to the Arp2/3 complex at the same time as cortactin may enhance nucleation site stability.

== Location and function in the cell ==
Inactive cortactin diffuses throughout the cytoplasm, but upon phosphorylation, the protein begins to target certain areas in the cell. Cortactin-assisted Arp2/3-nucleated actin branches are most prominent in the actin cortex, around the periphery of the cell. A phosphorylated cortactin monomer binds to, activates, and stabilizes an Arp2/3 complex on preexisting F-actin, which provides a nucleation site for a new actin branch to form from the “mother” filament. Branches formed from cortactin-assisted nucleation sites are very stable; cortactin has been shown to inhibit debranching. Thus, polymerization and branching of actin is promoted in areas of the cell where cortactin is localized.

Cortactin is very active in lamellipodia, protrusions of the cell membrane formed by actin polymerization and treadmilling that propel the cell along a surface as it migrates towards some target.

Cortactin acts as a link between extracellular signals and lamellipodial “steering.” When a receptor tyrosine kinase on the cell membrane binds to an adhesion site, for example, cortactin will be phosphorylated locally to the area of binding, activate and recruit Arp2/3 to the actin cortex in that region, and thus stimulate cortical actin polymerization and movement of the cell in that direction. Macrophages, highly motile immune cells that engulf cellular debris and pathogens, are propelled by lamellipodia and identify/migrate toward a target via chemotaxis; thus, cortactin must also be activated by receptor kinases that pick up a large variety of chemical signals.

Studies have implicated cortactin in both clathrin-mediated endocytosis and clathrin-independent endocytosis. In both kinds of endocytosis, it has long been known that actin localizes to sites of vesicle invagination and is a vital part of the endocytic pathway, but the actual mechanisms by which actin facilitates endocytosis are still unclear. Recently, however, it has been found that dynamin, the protein responsible for breaking the newly formed vesicular bud off the inside of the plasma membrane, can associate with the SH3 domain of cortactin. Since cortactin recruits the Arp2/3 complexes that lead to actin polymerization, this suggests that it may play an important part in linking vesicle formation to the as yet unknown functions actin has in endocytosis.

== Clinical significance ==
Amplification of the genes encoding cortactin—in humans, EMS1—has been found to occur in certain tumors. Overexpression of cortactin can lead to highly-active lamellipodia in tumor cells, dubbed “invadopodia.” These cells are especially invasive and migratory, making them very dangerous, for they can easily spread cancer across the body into other tissues.

== Interactions ==
Cortactin has been shown to interact with:

- ACTR3
- ARPC2,
- CTNND1,
- FER,
- KCNA2,
- SHANK2,
- WASL, and
- WIPF1.

== See also ==
- actin
- gelsolin
- transferrin
- villin
