= Pseudopodia =

False leg found on slime molds, archaea, protozoans, leukocytes and certain bacteria

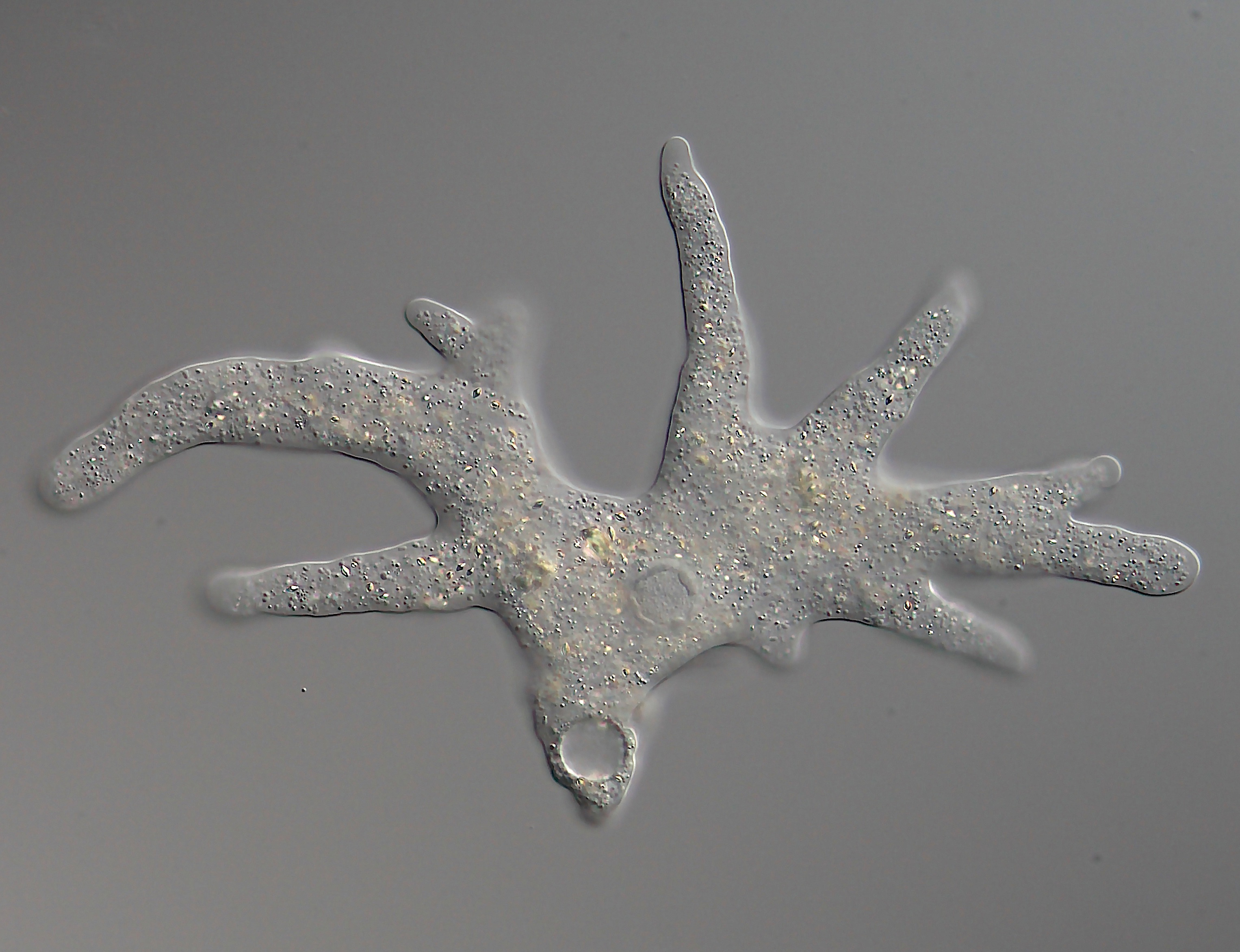
Amoeba proteus extending lobose pseudopodia

A pseudopod or pseudopodium (pl.: pseudopods or pseudopodia) is a temporary arm-like projection of a eukaryotic cell membrane that is emerged in the direction of movement. Filled with cytoplasm, pseudopodia primarily consist of actin filaments and may also contain microtubules and intermediate filaments. Pseudopods are used for motility and ingestion. They are often found in amoebas.

Different types of pseudopodia can be classified by their distinct appearances. Lamellipodia are broad and thin. Filopodia are slender, thread-like, and are supported largely by microfilaments. Lobopodia are bulbous and amoebic. Reticulopodia are complex structures bearing individual pseudopodia which form irregular nets. Axopodia are the phagocytosis type with long, thin pseudopods supported by complex microtubule arrays enveloped with cytoplasm; they respond rapidly to physical contact.

Generally, several pseudopodia arise from the surface of the body, (polypodial, for example, Amoeba proteus), or a single pseudopod may form on the surface of the body (monopodial, such as Entamoeba histolytica).

== Formation ==
Cells which make pseudopods are generally referred to as amoeboids.

=== Via extracellular cue ===
To move towards a target, the cell uses chemotaxis. It senses extracellular signalling molecules, chemoattractants (e.g. cAMP for Dictyostelium cells), to extend pseudopodia at the membrane area facing the source of these molecules.

The chemoattractants bind to G protein-coupled receptors, which activate GTPases of the Rho family (e.g. Cdc42, Rac) via G proteins.

Rho GTPases are able to activate WASp which in turn activate Arp2/3 complex which serve as nucleation sites for actin polymerization. The actin polymers then push the membrane as they grow, forming the pseudopod. The pseudopodium can then adhere to a surface via its adhesion proteins (e.g. integrins), and then pull the cell's body forward via contraction of an actin-myosin complex in the pseudopod. This type of locomotion is called amoeboid movement.

Rho GTPases can also activate phosphatidylinositol 3-kinase (PI3K) which recruit PIP_{3} to the membrane at the leading edge and detach the PIP_{3}-degrading enzyme PTEN from the same area of the membrane. PIP_{3} then activate GTPases back via GEF stimulation. This serves as a feedback loop to amplify and maintain the presence of local GTPase at the leading edge.

Otherwise, pseudopodia cannot grow on other sides of the membrane than the leading edge because myosin filaments prevent them to extend. These myosin filaments are induced by cyclic GMP in D. discoideum or Rho kinase in neutrophils for example.

Different physical parameters were shown to regulate the length and time-scale of pseudopodia formation. For example, an increase in membrane tension inhibits actin assembly and protrusion formation. It was demonstrated that the lowered negative surface charge on the inner surface of the plasma membrane generates protrusions via activation of the Ras-PI3K/AKT/mTOR signalling pathway.

=== Without extracellular cue ===
In the case there is no extracellular cue, all moving cells navigate in random directions, but they can keep the same direction for some time before turning. This feature allows cells to explore large areas for colonization or searching for a new extracellular cue.

In Dictyostelium cells, a pseudopodium can form either de novo as normal, or from an existing pseudopod, forming a Y-shaped pseudopodium.

The Y-shaped pseudopods are used by Dictyostelium to advance relatively straight forward by alternating between retraction of the left or right branch of the pseudopod. The de novo pseudopodia form at different sides than pre-existing ones, they are used by the cells to turn.

Y-shaped pseudopods are more frequent than de novo ones, which explain the preference of the cell to keep moving to the same direction. This persistence is modulated by PLA2 and cGMP signalling pathways.

== Functions ==
The functions of pseudopodia include locomotion and ingestion:

- Pseudopodia are critical in sensing targets which can then be engulfed; the engulfing pseudopodia are called phagocytosis pseudopodia. A common example of this type of amoeboid cell is the macrophage.
- They are also essential to amoeboid-like locomotion. Human mesenchymal stem cells are a good example of this function: these migratory cells are responsible for in-utero remodeling; for example, in the formation of the trilaminar germ disc during gastrulation.

== Morphology ==
The forms of pseudopodia, from left: polypodial and lobose; monopodial and lobose; filose; conical; reticulose; tapering actinopods; non-tapering actinopods

Pseudopods can be classified into several varieties according to the number of projections (monopodia and polypodia), and according to their appearance.

Some pseudopodial cells are able to use multiple types of pseudopodia depending on the situation. Most use a combination of lamellipodia and filopodia to migrate (e.g. metastatic cancer cells). Human foreskin fibroblasts can either use lamellipodia- or lobopodia-based migration in a 3D matrix depending on the matrix elasticity.

=== Lamellipodia ===
Lamellipodia are broad and flat pseudopodia used in locomotion. They are supported by microfilaments which form at the leading edge, creating a mesh-like internal network.

=== Filopodia ===
Filopodia (or filose pseudopods) are slender and filiform with pointed ends, consisting mainly of ectoplasm. These formations are supported by microfilaments which, unlike the filaments of lamellipodia with their net-like actin, form loose bundles by cross-linking. This formation is partly due to bundling proteins such as fimbrins and fascins. Filopodia are observed in some animal cells: in part of Filosa (Rhizaria), in "Testaceafilosia", in Vampyrellidae and Pseudosporida (Rhizaria) and in Nucleariida (Opisthokonta).

=== Lobopodia ===
Lobopodia (or lobose pseudopods) are bulbous, short, and blunt in form. These finger-like, tubular pseudopodia contain both ectoplasm and endoplasm. They can be found in different kind of cells, notably in Lobosa and other Amoebozoa and in some Heterolobosea (Excavata).

High-pressure lobopodia can also be found in human fibroblasts travelling through a complex network of 3D matrix (e.g. mammalian dermis, cell-derived matrix). Contrarily to other pseudopodia using the pressure exerted by actin polymerization on the membrane to extend, fibroblast lobopods use the nuclear piston mechanism consisting in pulling the nucleus via actomyosin contractility to push the cytoplasm that in turn push the membrane, leading to pseudopod formation. To occur, this lobopodia-based fibroblast migration needs nesprin 3, integrins, RhoA, ROCK and myosin II. Otherwise, lobopods are often accompanied with small lateral blebs forming along the side of the cell, probably due to the high intracellular pressure during lobopodia formation increasing the frequency of plasma membrane-cortex rupture.

=== Reticulopodia ===
Reticulopodia (or reticulose pseudopods), are complex formations in which individual pseudopods are merged and form irregular nets. The primary function of reticulopodia, also known as myxopodia, is food ingestion, with locomotion a secondary function. Reticulopods are typical of Foraminifera, Chlorarachnea, Gromia and Filoreta (Rhizaria).

If a pseudopod is branched as a reticulopod is but not forming a network, it is known as a rhizopod.

=== Axopodia ===
Axopodia (also known as actinopodia) are narrow pseudopodia containing complex arrays of microtubules enveloped by cytoplasm. Axopodia are mostly responsible for phagocytosis by rapidly retracting in response to physical contact. These pseudopodia are primarily food-collecting structures, but also provide a means of hydrological transportation via the expansion of their surface areas. They are observed in Radiolaria and Heliozoa.
