= Actin nucleation core =

Protein trimer with three actin monomers

An actin nucleation core is a protein trimer with three actin monomers. It is called a nucleation core because it leads to the energetically favorable elongation reaction once a tetramer is formed from a trimer. Actin protein dimers and trimers are energetically unfavorable. Actin nucleators like the Arp2/3 complex of proteins from the formin family are most frequently involved in this process. Actin nucleation factors start the polymerization of actin within cells.

Many distinct proteins that can mediate the de novo nucleation of filaments directly interact with actin and promote it. This gives protrusive membrane formations their initial impetus. These entities may take the form of pseudopodia, invadopodia, or non-apoptotic membrane blebs.

== Mechanism ==
The unfavorable kinetics of actin oligomer production prevent spontaneous actin polymerization.Once an actin nucleus has been created, the connection of the monomers happens swiftly, with the plus end developing considerably more quickly than the minus end. Actin's ATPase activity sharply rises after insertion into the filament. The filament becomes less stable as a result of spontaneous ATP hydrolysis and phosphate dissociation, making it more vulnerable to the effects of severing proteins such those in the actin depolymerizing factor (ADF)/cofilin family. The kinetic barrier that prohibits spontaneous actin polymerization gives the cell a versatile tool for temporally and spatially controlling the assembly of de novo actin filaments.

Monomer binding proteins limit the availability of subunits for filament production while severing proteins, such as those in the destrin and cofilin families, regulate filament deconstruction. The cell has a flexible tool for temporally and spatially regulating the creation of de novo actin filaments thanks to the kinetic barrier that prevents spontaneous actin polymerization. Direct actin nucleation in response to external cues allows actin nucleators to swiftly and successfully initiate new actin filaments. These proteins serve as the targets of numerous intracellular signaling cascades. Most significantly, members of the Rho-GTPase family, including CDC42, are essential for controlling actin turnover and coordinating the control of actin nucleating activities.

== Additional application ==
To mimic the behavior of mature LPS-DCs (LPS-treatment) (dendric cell) in terms of migration and macropinocytosis, it is sufficient to block or knock out Arp2/3 in iDCs, suggesting that Arp2/3 expression or activity is downregulated as a result of LPS-induced DC maturation. Arp2/3 expression levels were unaffected by LPS treatment of DCs, however it's likely that mature DCs exhibited reduced actin-nucleation activity.

LPS-DCs and iDCs(immature dendric cell) both require mDia1-dependent actin nucleation for locomotion, while iDCs link antigen intake to cell motility using Arp2/3-dependent actin nucleation. In response to LPS sensing, Arp2/3 significantly reduces actin nucleation at the front, which allows mature DCs to adopt a quick and directional migratory mode.

Inhibition of Arp2/3 increased the speed and decreased the accumulation of F-actin at the front of iDCs. As a result of the absence of Arp2/3-dependent actin at the cell front, LPS-DCs migrate more quickly than iDCs. Arpc2KO iDCs saw a similar increase in cell velocity and moved as swiftly as LPS-DCs. Additionally, in under-agarose migration studies, Arpc2KO DCs migrated substantially more swiftly. This was unrelated to DC development. In contrast to protrusion-based locomotion, the Arp2/3-dependent pool of F-actin present at the front of iDCs limits their migration.

== Bibliography ==
- Nürnberg, Alexander; Kitzing, Thomas; Grosse, Robert (March 2011). "Nucleating actin for invasion". Nature Reviews Cancer. 11 (3): 177–187. doi:10.1038/nrc3003. PMID 21326322. S2CID 9063688.
  - This article is a peer-reviewed and is about the surrounding tissue and cancer cells. Actin nuclei are discussed, as well as how different structures like invadopodia and pseudopodia originate. Human cells have a wide range of actin nucleators, including formins, spire, and Arp2/3 regulatory proteins, and the number is likely to increase.
- Vargas, Pablo; Maiuri, Paolo; Bretou, Marine; Sáez, Pablo J.; Pierobon, Paolo; Maurin, Mathieu; Chabaud, Mélanie; Lankar, Danielle; Obino, Dorian; Terriac, Emmanuel; Raab, Matthew; Thiam, Hawa-Racine; Brocker, Thomas; Kitchen-Goosen, Susan M.; Alberts, Arthur S.; Sunareni, Praveen; Xia, Sheng; Li, Rong; Voituriez, Raphael; Piel, Matthieu; Lennon-Duménil, Ana-Maria (January 2016). "Innate control of actin nucleation determines two distinct migration behaviours in dendritic cells". Nature Cell Biology. 18 (1): 43–53. doi:10.1038/ncb3284. PMC 5885286. PMID 26641718.
  - This article is a peer-reviewed article which is about the dendritic cell (DC) migration and induction of Arp2/3-dependent actin.
