= Lamellipodium =

Actin projection on the leading edge of a migrating cell

The lamellipodium (pl.: lamellipodia) (from Latin lamella, related to lamina, "thin sheet", and the Greek radical pod-, "foot") is a cytoskeletal protein actin projection on the leading edge of the cell. It contains a quasi-two-dimensional actin mesh (The overall shape is a flat sheet, but if you zoom into the mesh itself, the individual ropes occasionally hop over each other in 3D space); the whole structure propels the cell across a substrate. Within the lamellipodia are ribs of actin called microspikes, which, when they spread beyond the lamellipodium frontier, are called filopodia. The lamellipodium is born of actin nucleation in the plasma membrane of the cell and is the primary area of actin incorporation or microfilament formation of the cell.

== Description ==
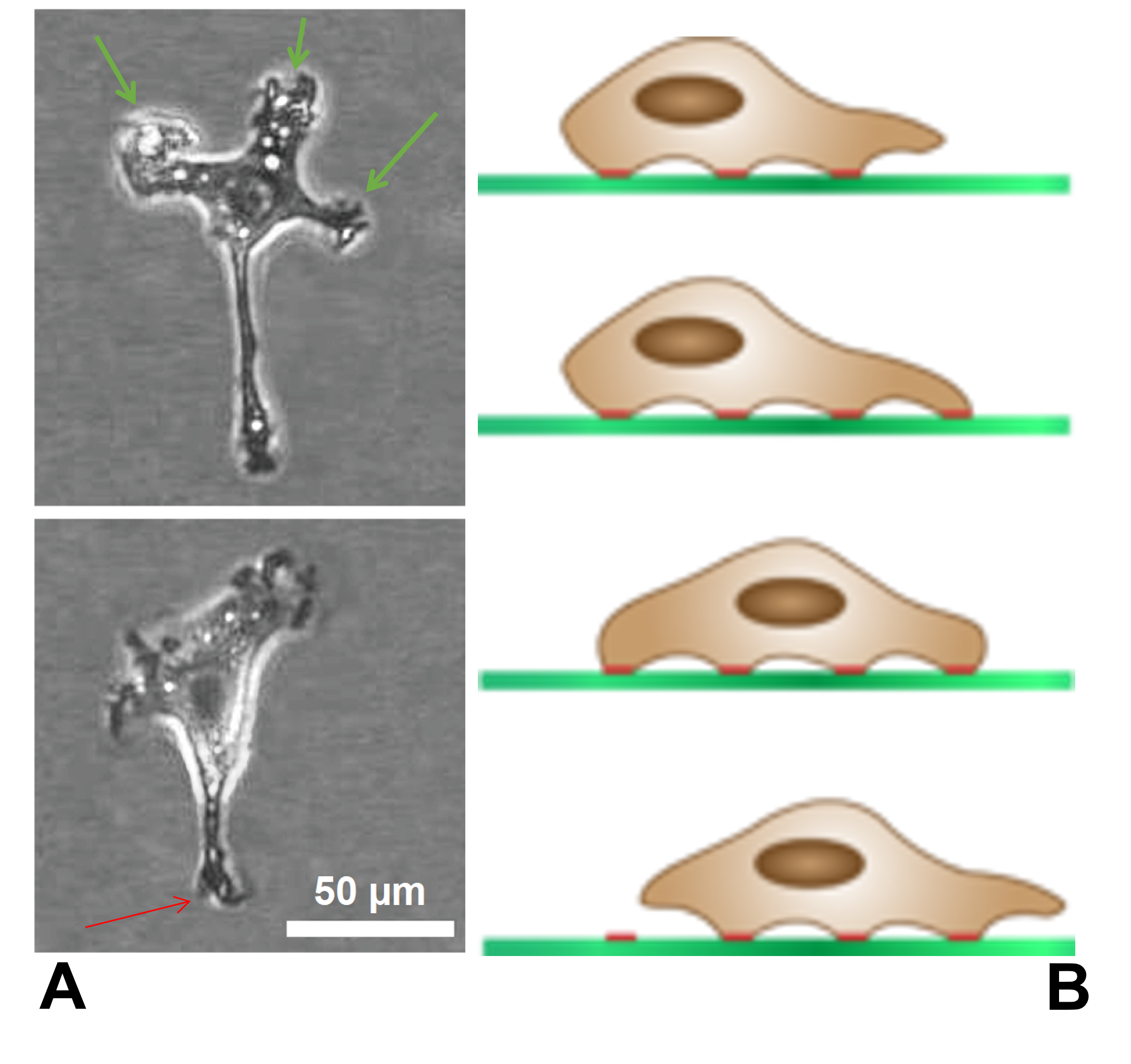
Figure 1. Lamellipodia are thin-like projections on the leading edge of a cell (Image A). It is a feature of motile cells such as endothelial cells, neurons, and immune cells. The lamellipodia on the leading edge of the cell (green arrows) contain ATP- bound actin and the lamella on the "spike" end of the cell contain ADP-bound actin (red arrow). This allows for a "treadmilling" action to occur when the cell is signaled to move (Image B).

Lamellipodia are found primarily in all mobile cells, such as the keratinocytes of fish and frogs, which are involved in the quick repair of wounds. The lamellipodia of these keratinocytes allow them to move at speeds of 10–20 μm / min over epithelial surfaces. When separated from the main part of a cell, a lamellipodium can still crawl about freely on its own.

Lamellipodia are a characteristic feature at the front, leading edge, of motile cells. They are believed to be the actual motor which pulls the cell forward during the process of cell migration. The tip of the lamellipodium is the site where exocytosis occurs in migrating mammalian cells as part of their clathrin-mediated endocytic cycle. This, together with actin-polymerisation there, helps extend the lamella forward and thus advance the cell's front. It thus acts as a steering device for cells in the process of chemotaxis. It is also the site from which particles or aggregates attached to the cell surface migrate in a process known as cap formation.

Structure

Structurally, the barbed ends of the microfilaments (localized actin monomers in an ATP-bound form) face the "seeking" edge of the cell, while the pointed ends (localized actin monomers in an ADP-bound form) face the lamella behind. This creates treadmilling throughout the lamellipodium, which aids in the retrograde flow of particles throughout. Arp2/3 complexes are present at microfilament-microfilament junctions in lamellipodia, and help create the actin meshwork. Arp2/3 can only join onto previously existing microfilaments, but once bound it creates a site for the extension of new microfilaments, which creates branching. Another molecule that is often found in polymerizing actin with Arp2/3 is cortactin, which appears to link tyrosine kinase signalling to cytoskeletal reorganization in the lamellipodium and its associated structures.

Rac and Cdc42 are two Rho-family GTPases which are normally cytosolic but can also be found in the cell membrane under certain conditions. When Cdc42 is activated, it can interact with Wiskott–Aldrich syndrome protein (WASp) family receptors, in particular N-WASp, which then activates Arp2/3. This stimulates actin branching and increases cell motility. Rac1 induces cortactin to localize to the cell membrane, where it simultaneously binds F-actin and Arp2/3. The result is a structural reorganization of the lamellipodium and ensuing cell motility. Rac promotes lamellipodia while cdc42 promotes filopodia.

Ena/VASP proteins are found at the leading edge of lamellipodia, where they promote actin polymerization necessary for lamellipodial protrusion and chemotaxis. Further, Ena/VASP prevents the action of capping protein, which halts actin polymerization.
