= ACTR2 =

Mammalian protein found in humans

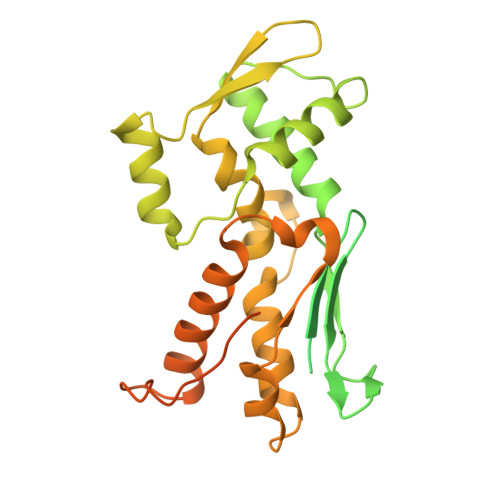

Identifiers
- Aliases: ACTR2, ARP2, ARP2 actin-related protein 2 homolog (yeast), ARP2 actin related protein 2 homolog, actin related protein 2, Actin related protein 2/3 complex subunit 2, p34-ARC, ARPC2, arp2/3 complex 34 kDa subunit, testis tissue sperm-binding protein Li 53e, actin related protein 2/3 complex, subunit 2, 34kDa, ARP2/3 protein complex subunit 34, actin-related protein 2/3 complex subunit 2
- External IDs: OMIM: 604221; MGI: 1913963; GeneCards: ACTR2
Available structures
PDB	Ortholog search: PDBe RCSB
PDB	List of PDB id codes 2P9N, 1TYQ, 1U2V, 4JD2, 3DXK, 3UKU, 3UKR, 2P9P, 2P9U, 3ULE, 3RSE, 2P9S, 2P9I, 4XF2, 2P9L, 1K8K, 3DXM, 4XEI

Gene location (Human)
Chr.	Chromosome 2 (human)
Band	2p14	Start	65,227,788 bp
Band	2p14	End	65,271,253 bp

Gene location (Mouse)
Chr.	Chromosome 11 (mouse)
Band	11 A3.1|11 12.88 cM	Start	20,012,304 bp
Band	11 A3.1|11 12.88 cM	End	20,062,913 bp
RNA expression pattern
Bgee	Human / Mouse (ortholog); Top expressed in: monocyte; trabecular bone; epithelium of nasopharynx; appendix; palpebral conjunctiva; lymph node; mucosa of sigmoid colon; bone marrow; visceral pleura; bone marrow cell / Top expressed in: stroma of bone marrow; granulocyte; tibiofemoral joint; medial dorsal nucleus; dorsal striatum; trigeminal ganglion; globus pallidus; blood; nucleus of stria terminalis; amygdala; More reference expression data
BioGPS	n/a
Gene ontology
Molecular function	nucleotide binding; actin filament binding; structural constituent of cytoskeleton; actin binding; ATP binding; cytoskeletal protein binding
Cellular component	cytoplasm; cytosol; cell projection; membrane; focal adhesion; Arp2/3 Protein Complex; cell cortex; actin cytoskeleton; actin cap; extracellular exosome; cytoskeleton; extracellular region; postsynaptic density; lamellipodium; azurophil granule lumen; ficolin-1-rich granule lumen; podosome core
Biological process	cytosolic transport; Fc-gamma receptor signaling pathway involved in phagocytosis; actin filament organization; ephrin receptor signaling pathway; meiotic chromosome movement towards spindle pole; meiotic cytokinesis; establishment or maintenance of cell polarity; meiosis; asymmetric cell division; Arp2/3 complex-mediated actin nucleation; spindle localization; actin cytoskeleton organization; associative learning; response to immobilization stress; cellular response to trichostatin A; neutrophil degranulation; response to ethanol; cilium assembly; positive regulation of dendritic spine morphogenesis; membrane organization
Sources:Amigo / QuickGO
Orthologs
Databases	NCBI: entry; OMA: entry
Species	Human	Mouse
Entrez	10097	66713
Ensembl	ENSG00000138071	ENSMUSG00000020152
UniProt	P61160	P61161
RefSeq (mRNA)	NM_005722; NM_001005386	NM_146243; NM_001362899
RefSeq (protein)	NP_001005386; NP_005713	NP_666355; NP_001349828
Location (UCSC)	Chr 2: 65.23 – 65.27 Mb	Chr 11: 20.01 – 20.06 Mb
PubMed search
- Wikidata
View/Edit Human	View/Edit Mouse

Actin-related protein 2 is a protein that in humans is encoded by the ACTR2 gene.

The specific function of ACTR2 has not yet been determined. However, it is known to be a major constituent of the ARP2/3 complex. This complex is located at the cell surface and is essential to cell shape and motility through lamellipodial actin assembly and protrusion. Two transcript variants encoding different isoforms have been found for this gene.
