= ARPC1A =

Mammalian protein found in Homo sapiens

Identifiers
- Aliases: ARPC1A, Arc40, HEL-68, SOP2Hs, SOP2L, HEL-S-307, actin related protein 2/3 complex subunit 1A
- External IDs: OMIM: 604220; MGI: 1928896; GeneCards: ARPC1A

Gene location (Human)
Chr.	Chromosome 7 (human)
Band	7q22.1	Start	99,325,898 bp
Band	7q22.1	End	99,366,262 bp

Gene location (Mouse)
Chr.	Chromosome 5 (mouse)
Band	5|5 G2	Start	145,020,640 bp
Band	5|5 G2	End	145,045,571 bp
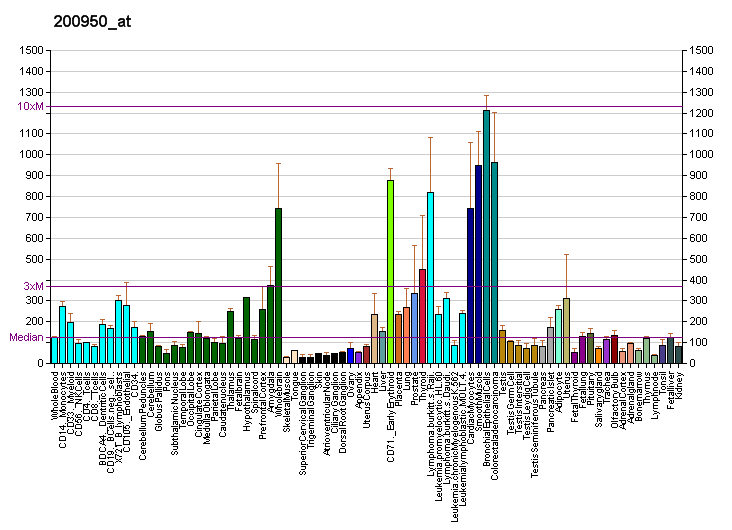
RNA expression pattern
Bgee	Human / Mouse (ortholog); Top expressed in: mucosa of transverse colon; gonad; hippocampus proper; hypothalamus; Brodmann area 9; amygdala; substantia nigra; body of stomach; putamen; nucleus accumbens / Top expressed in: transitional epithelium of urinary bladder; olfactory tubercle; superior frontal gyrus; nucleus accumbens; dentate gyrus of hippocampal formation granule cell; sciatic nerve; islet of Langerhans; lip; globus pallidus; ganglionic eminence; More reference expression data
BioGPS	More reference expression data
Gene ontology
Molecular function	actin binding; actin filament binding
Cellular component	cytoplasm; cytosol; Arp2/3 Protein Complex; extracellular exosome; cytoskeleton; actin cytoskeleton; muscle cell projection membrane; nucleus; site of double-strand break
Biological process	ephrin receptor signaling pathway; regulation of actin filament polymerization; actin cytoskeleton organization; Fc-gamma receptor signaling pathway involved in phagocytosis; Arp2/3 complex-mediated actin nucleation; membrane organization
Sources:Amigo / QuickGO
Orthologs
Databases	NCBI: entry; OMA: entry
Species	Human	Mouse
Entrez	10552	56443
Ensembl	ENSG00000241685	ENSMUSG00000029621
UniProt	Q92747	Q9R0Q6
RefSeq (mRNA)	NM_006409; NM_001190996	NM_019767
RefSeq (protein)	NP_001177925; NP_006400	NP_062741
Location (UCSC)	Chr 7: 99.33 – 99.37 Mb	Chr 5: 145.02 – 145.05 Mb
PubMed search
- Wikidata
View/Edit Human	View/Edit Mouse

Actin-related protein 2/3 complex subunit 1A is a protein that in humans is encoded by the ARPC1A gene.

This gene encodes one of seven subunits of the human Arp2/3 protein complex. This subunit is a member of the SOP2 family of proteins and is most similar to the protein encoded by gene ARPC1B. The similarity between these two proteins suggests that they both may function as p41 subunit of the human Arp2/3 complex that has been implicated in the control of actin polymerization in cells. It is possible that the p41 subunit is involved in assembling and maintaining the structure of the Arp2/3 complex. Multiple versions of the p41 subunit may adapt the functions of the complex to different cell types or developmental stages.
