= Rho GTPase-activating protein 21 =

Protein-coding gene in the species Homo sapiens

ARHGAP21

Identifiers
- Aliases: ARHGAP21, ARHGAP10, Rho GTPase activating protein 21
- External IDs: OMIM: 609870; MGI: 1918685; GeneCards: ARHGAP21
Available structures
PDB	Ortholog search: PDBe RCSB
PDB	List of PDB id codes 2DHJ, 2J59, 2YUY

Gene location (Human)
Chr.	Chromosome 10 (human)
Band	10p12.1|10p12.3	Start	24,583,609 bp
Band	10p12.1|10p12.3	End	24,723,668 bp

Gene location (Mouse)
Chr.	Chromosome 2 (mouse)
Band	2|2 A3	Start	20,852,730 bp
Band	2|2 A3	End	20,973,692 bp
RNA expression pattern
Bgee	Human / Mouse (ortholog); Top expressed in: right hemisphere of cerebellum; ventricular zone; ganglionic eminence; C1 segment; right frontal lobe; Brodmann area 9; Achilles tendon; cingulate gyrus; anterior cingulate cortex; stromal cell of endometrium / Top expressed in: lacrimal gland; cerebellar cortex; lobe of cerebellum; cerebellar vermis; parotid gland; zygote; secondary oocyte; subiculum; Region I of hippocampus proper; dentate gyrus of hippocampal formation granule cell; More reference expression data
BioGPS	n/a
Gene ontology
Molecular function	protein binding; GTPase activator activity
Cellular component	Golgi apparatus; Golgi membrane; cytoplasmic vesicle membrane; membrane; cytoplasmic vesicle; cytoplasm; cytoskeleton; cytosol; plasma membrane; actin cytoskeleton; cell junction
Biological process	establishment of Golgi localization; Golgi organization; organelle transport along microtubule; maintenance of Golgi location; signal transduction; positive regulation of GTPase activity; regulation of small GTPase mediated signal transduction
Sources:Amigo / QuickGO
Orthologs
Databases	NCBI: entry; OMA: entry
Species	Human	Mouse
Entrez	57584	71435
Ensembl	ENSG00000107863	ENSMUSG00000036591
UniProt	Q5T5U3	Q6DFV3
RefSeq (mRNA)	NM_020824	NM_001081364; NM_001128084
RefSeq (protein)	NP_065875; NP_001354376; NP_001354377; NP_001354378; NP_001354379 NP_001354380; NP_001354381; NP_001354382; NP_001354383; NP_001354384	NP_001074833; NP_001121556; NP_001395248; NP_001395249; NP_001395250 NP_001395251; NP_001395252; NP_001395253; NP_001395254
Location (UCSC)	Chr 10: 24.58 – 24.72 Mb	Chr 2: 20.85 – 20.97 Mb
PubMed search
- Wikidata
View/Edit Human	View/Edit Mouse

Rho GTPase activating protein 21 is a protein that in humans is encoded by the ARHGAP21 gene.

== Function ==
ARHGAP21 functions preferentially as a GTPase-activating protein (GAP) for CDC42 (MIM 116952) and regulates the ARP2/3 complex (MIM 604221) and F-actin dynamics at the Golgi through control of CDC42 activity. There is little scientific literature on ARHGAP21, but recent reviews highlighted that it plays an important role in cytoskeletal processes in cancer, substance transport within the cell, and insulin secretion
