= Ena/Vasp homology proteins =

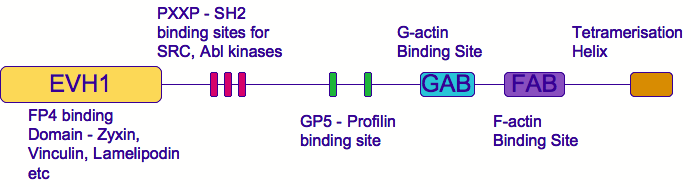
- Domain organisation of EVH proteins

Identifiers
- Symbol: VASP/EVL
- InterPro: IPR017354
Available protein structures:
- PDB: IPR017354
- AlphaFold: IPR017354

VASP tetramerisation domain
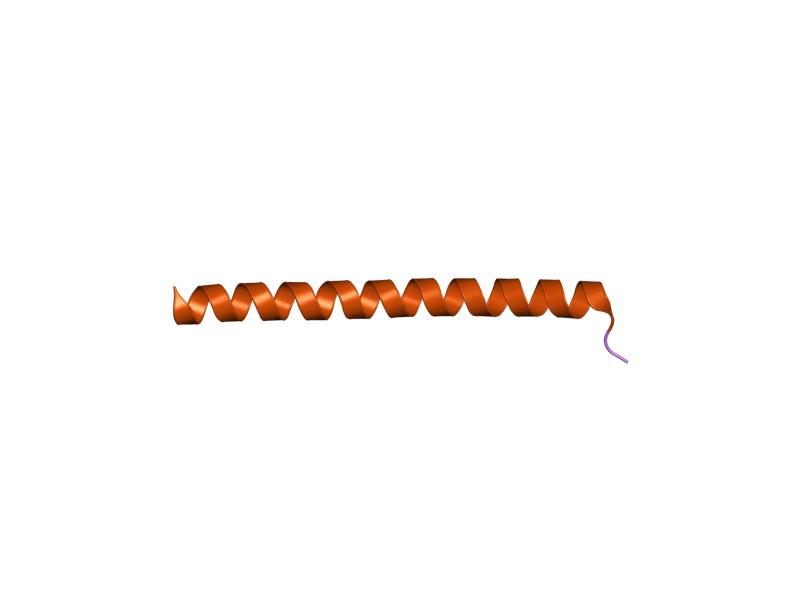
- Human vasp tetramerisation domain L352M

Identifiers
- Symbol: VASP_tetra
- Pfam: PF08776
- InterPro: IPR014885
Available protein structures:
- PDB: IPR014885 PF08776 (ECOD; PDBsum)
- AlphaFold: IPR014885; PF08776

ENA/VASP homology proteins or EVH proteins are a family of closely related proteins involved in cell motility in vertebrate and invertebrate animals. EVH proteins are modular proteins that are involved in actin polymerization, as well as interactions with other proteins. Within the cell, ENA/VASP proteins are found at the leading edge of lamellipodia and at the tips of filopodia. ENA, the founding member of the family, was discovered in a fruit fly genetic screen for mutations that act as dominant suppressors of the AB non receptor tyrosine kinase. Invertebrate animals have one Ena homologue, whereas mammals have three, named Mena, VASP, and Evl.

ENA/VASP proteins promote the spatially regulated actin polymerization required for efficient chemotaxis in response to attractive and repulsive guidance cues. Mice lacking functional copies of all three family members display pleiotropic phenotypes including exencephaly, edema, failures in neurite formation, and embryonic lethality.

A sub-domain of EVH is the EVH1 domain.

== VASP ==
Vasodilator-stimulated phosphoprotein (VASP) 45-residue-long tetramerization protein domain which regulates actin dynamics in the cytoskeleton. This is vital for processes such as cell adhesion and cell migration.

== Function ==
Ena/VASP proteins are actin cytoskeletal regulatory proteins. Ena/VASP proteins are often found in dynamic actin structures like filopodia and lamellipodia, but the precise function in their formation is controversial. Ena/VASP proteins remain processively bound to growing barbed (+) ends of an actin filaments. They promote actin filament elongation both by delivering monomeric actin to the barbed (+) ends as well as protecting these ends from F-actin capping protein.

== Structure ==
The tetramerisation domain has a right-handed alpha helical coiled-coil structure.
