= Enah/Vasp-like =

Protein-coding gene in the species Homo sapiens

EVL
Available structures
PDB	Ortholog search: PDBe RCSB
PDB	List of PDB id codes 1QC6

Identifiers
- Aliases: EVL, RNB6, Enah/Vasp-like
- External IDs: OMIM: 616912; MGI: 1194884; HomoloGene: 56752; GeneCards: EVL; OMA:EVL - orthologs

Gene location (Human)
Chr.	Chromosome 14 (human)
Band	14q32.2	Start	99,971,449 bp
Band	14q32.2	End	100,144,236 bp

Gene location (Mouse)
Chr.	Chromosome 12 (mouse)
Band	12|12 F1	Start	108,520,979 bp
Band	12|12 F1	End	108,654,775 bp
RNA expression pattern
Bgee	Human / Mouse (ortholog); Top expressed in: granulocyte; right hemisphere of cerebellum; ganglionic eminence; right frontal lobe; anterior cingulate cortex; lymph node; nucleus accumbens; prefrontal cortex; anterior pituitary; caudate nucleus / Top expressed in: mesenteric lymph nodes; dorsomedial hypothalamic nucleus; Gonadal ridge; ganglionic eminence; ventricular zone; molar; lateral hypothalamus; habenula; mandibular prominence; dorsal tegmental nucleus; More reference expression data
BioGPS	n/a
Gene ontology
Molecular function	profilin binding; SH3 domain binding; protein binding; actin binding
Cellular component	cytoplasm; cytosol; cell projection; membrane; focal adhesion; cytoskeleton; lamellipodium; phagocytic vesicle
Biological process	positive regulation of actin filament polymerization; negative regulation of ruffle assembly; actin filament organization; nervous system development; axon guidance; cell surface receptor signaling pathway; animal organ morphogenesis; actin polymerization or depolymerization; protein homotetramerization; negative regulation of epithelial cell migration; positive regulation of stress fiber assembly; actin nucleation; cellular response to interferon-gamma
Sources:Amigo / QuickGO
Orthologs
Species	Human	Mouse
Entrez	51466	14026
Ensembl	ENSG00000196405	ENSMUSG00000021262
UniProt	Q9UI08	P70429
RefSeq (mRNA)	NM_016337; NM_001330221	NM_001163394; NM_001163395; NM_001163396; NM_007965
RefSeq (protein)	NP_001317150; NP_057421	NP_001156866; NP_001156867; NP_001156868; NP_031991
Location (UCSC)	Chr 14: 99.97 – 100.14 Mb	Chr 12: 108.52 – 108.65 Mb
PubMed search
- Wikidata
View/Edit Human	View/Edit Mouse

Ena/VASP-like protein is a member of the Ena/VASP family of proteins that in humans is encoded by the EVL gene.
