= Arp2/3 complex =

Macromolecular protein complex

Arp2/3 Complex
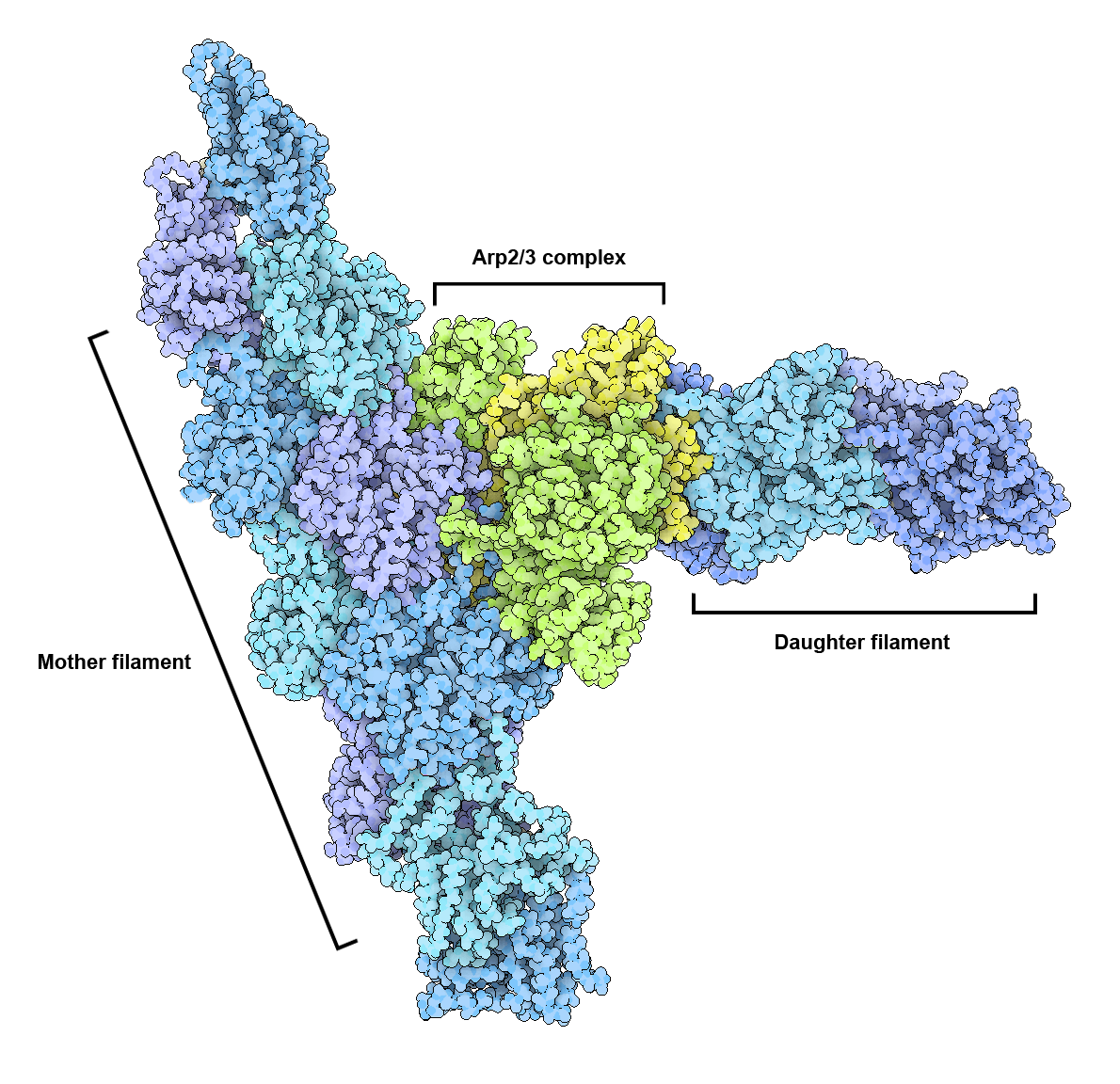
- Cryo-EM structure of the Arp2/3 complex at a branched-actin junction. (PDB: 7TPT)

Overview
- Synonyms: ARP2/3, Actin-related protein 2/3 complex
- Subunits: Arp2, Arp3, ARPC1A, ARPC1B, ARPC2, ARPC3, ARPC4, ARPC5
- Molecular mass: ~224 kDa
- Class: Actin binding proteins
- Functions: Actin cross-linking Actin branching Actin polymerization

Biological context
- Organism(s): Eukaryota
- Location: Cytoplasm
- Pathways: WASP-Arp2/3 pathway
- Processes: Synaptic plasticity Cell migration Endocytosis; Morphogenesis

Identifiers & Data
- PDB structures: 7TPT
- EMDB ID: EMD-46993
- Complex Portal: CPX-2592

Arp2/3 complex (Actin Related Protein 2/3 complex) is a seven-subunit protein complex that plays a major role in the regulation of the actin cytoskeleton. It is a major component of the actin cytoskeleton and is found in most eukaryotic cells. Two of its subunits, the Actin-Related Proteins ARP2 and ARP3, closely resemble the structure of monomeric actin and serve as nucleation sites for new actin filaments. The complex binds to the sides of existing ("mother") filaments and initiates growth of a new ("daughter") filament at a distinctive 70-degree angle from the mother. Branched actin networks are created as a result of this nucleation of new filaments. The regulation of rearrangements of the actin cytoskeleton is important for processes like cell locomotion, phagocytosis, and the intracellular motility of lipid vesicles.

The Arp2/3 complex was identified in 1994 (preliminarily described as "unconventional actins") by affinity chromatography from the human pathogen Acanthamoeba castellanii, though it had been previously isolated in 1989 in a search for proteins that bind to actin filaments in Drosophila melanogaster embryos.

== Mechanisms of actin polymerization by Arp2/3 ==
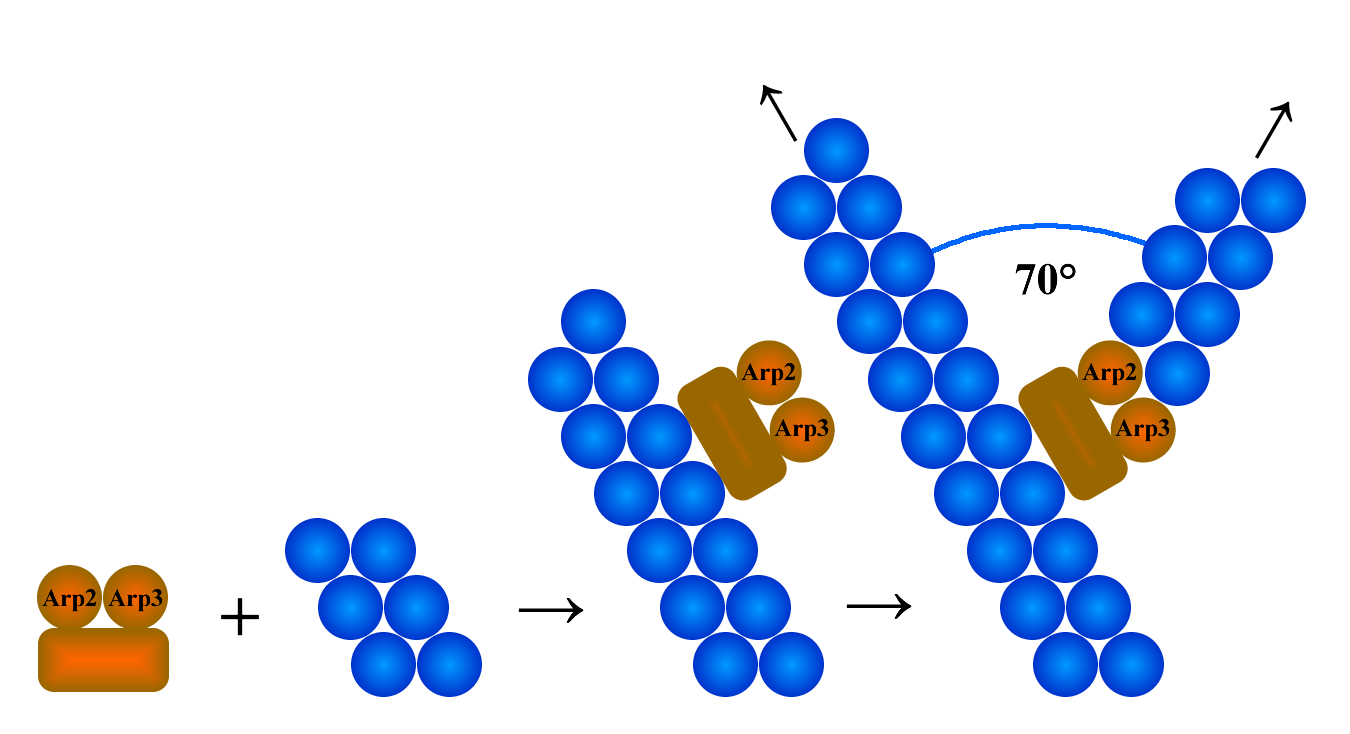
Side branching model of the Arp2/3 complex. Activated Arp2/3 complex binds to the side of a "mother" actin filament. Both Arp2 and Arp3 form the first two subunits in the new "daughter" filament.

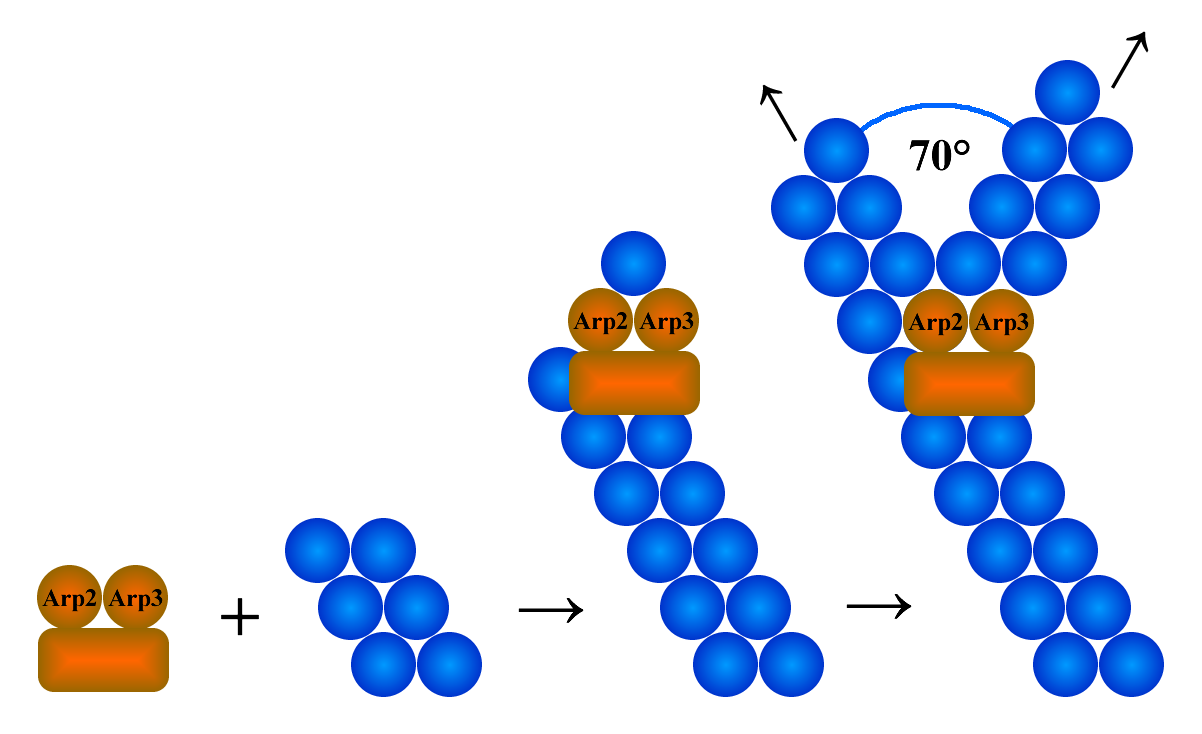
Barbed end branching model of the Arp2/3 complex. Activated Arp2/3 competes with capping proteins to bind to the barbed end of an actin filament. Arp2 remains bound to the mother filament, while Arp3 is outside. The two Arp subunits form the first subunits of each branch and the two branches continue to grow by addition of G-actin to each Arp

Many actin-related molecules create a free barbed end for polymerization by uncapping or severing pre-existing filaments and using these as actin nucleation cores. However, the Arp2/3 complex stimulates actin polymerization by creating a new nucleation core. Actin nucleation is an initial step in the formation of an actin filament. The nucleation core activity of Arp2/3 is activated by Nucleation Promoting Factors (NPFs) including members of the Wiskott-Aldrich syndrome family protein (WASP, N-WASP, WAVE, and WASH proteins). The V domain of a WASP protein interacts with actin monomers while the CA region associates with the Arp2/3 complex to create a nucleation core. However, de novo nucleation followed by polymerization is not sufficient to form integrated actin networks, since these newly synthesized polymers would not be associated with pre-existing filaments. Thus, the Arp2/3 complex binds to pre-existing filaments so that the new filaments can grow on the old ones and form a functional actin cytoskeleton. Capping proteins limit actin polymerization to the region activated by the Arp2/3 complex, and the elongated filament ends are recapped to prevent depolymerization and thus conserve the actin filament.

The Arp2/3 complex simultaneously controls nucleation of actin polymerization and branching of filaments. Moreover, autocatalysis is observed during Arp2/3-mediated actin polymerization. In this process, the newly formed filaments activate other Arp2/3 complexes, facilitating the formation of branched filaments.

The mechanism of actin filament initiation by Arp2/3 has been disputed. The question is where the complex binds the filament and nucleates a "daughter" filament. Historically two models have been proposed. Recent results favour the side branching model, in which the Arp2/3 complex binds to the side of a pre-existing ("mother") filament at a point different from the nucleation site. Although the field lacks a high-resolution crystal structure, data from electron microscopy, together with biochemical data on the filament nucleation and capping mechanisms of the Arp2/3 complex, favour side branching. In the alternative barbed end branching model, Arp2/3 only associates at the barbed end of growing filaments, allowing for the elongation of the original filament and the formation of a branched filament., a model based on kinetic analysis and optical microscopy.

Recent computer docking, independently confirmed by EM data, favors a side-branching model. ARPC2 and ARPC4 together form an area that attach the base of the branch to the side of a mother filament. Large conformational changes occur on nucleotide and WASP binding.

== Cellular uses of Arp2/3 ==
The Arp2/3 complex appears to be important in a variety of specialized cell functions that involve the actin cytoskeleton. The complex is found in cellular regions characterized by dynamic actin filament activity: in macropinocytic cups, in the leading edge of motile cells (lamellipodia), and in motile actin patches in yeast. In mammals and the social amoeba Dictyostelium discoideum it is required for phagocytosis. The complex has also been shown to be involved in the establishment of cell polarity and the migration of fibroblast monolayers in a wound-healing model. In mammalian oocytes, the Arp2/3 complex is involved in oocyte asymmetric division and polar body emission, which result from the failure of spindle migration (a unique feature of oocyte division) and cytokinesis. Moreover, enteropathogenic organisms like Listeria monocytogenes and Shigella use the Arp2/3 complex for actin-polymerization- dependent rocketing movements. The Arp2/3 complex also regulates the intracellular motility of endosomes, lysosomes, pinocytic vesicles, and mitochondria. Moreover, recent studies show that the Arp2/3 complex is essential for proper polar cell expansion in plants. Arp2/3 mutations in Arabidopsis thaliana result in abnormal filament organization, which in turn affects the expansion of trichomes, pavement cells, hypocotyl cells, and root hair cells. Chemical inhibition or genetic mutation of the Chlamydomonas reinhardtii Arp2/3 complex decreases the length of flagella.

== Subunits ==
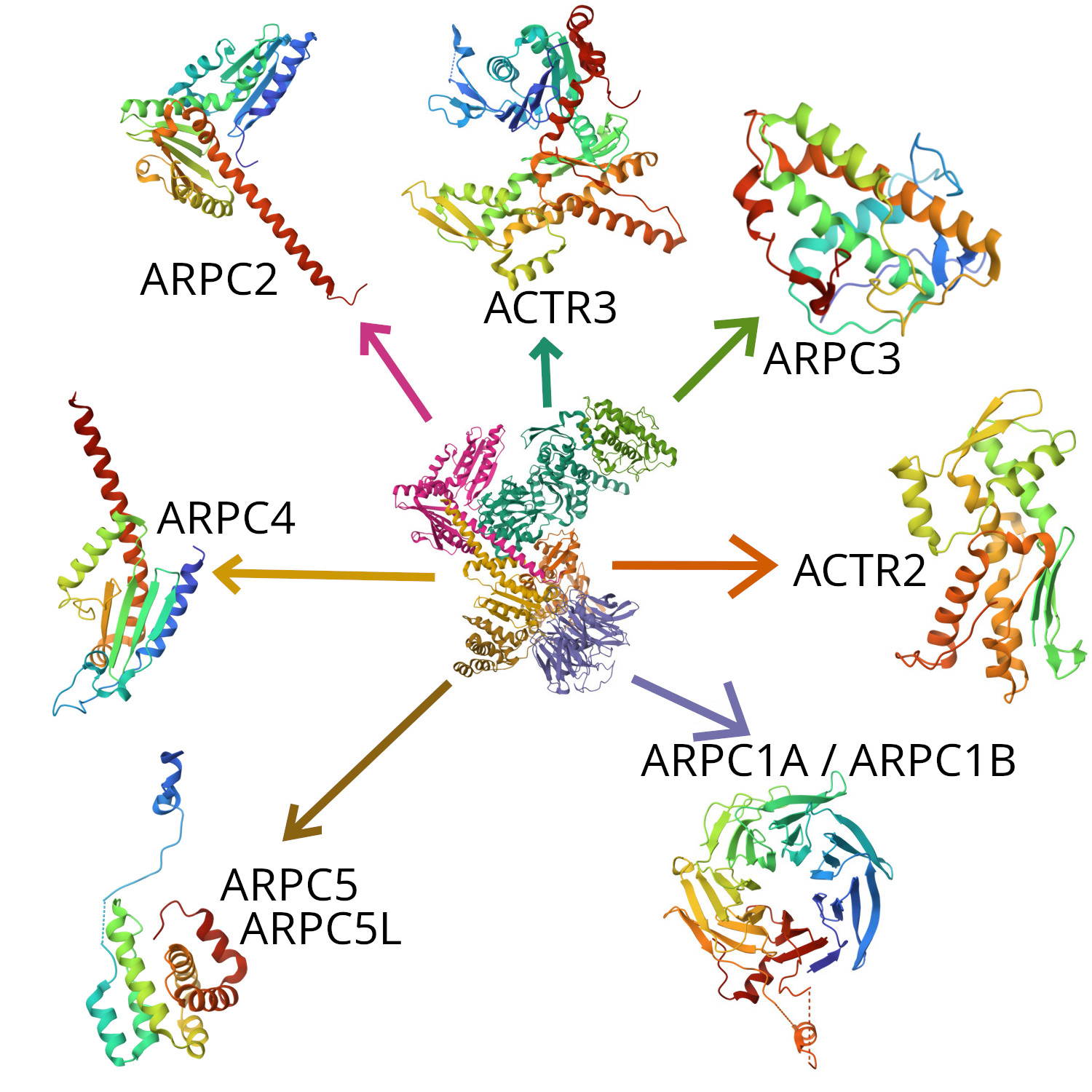

The Arp2/3 complex is composed of seven subunits: Arp2/ACTR2, Arp3/ACTR3, p41/ARPC1A&B/Arc40/Sop2/p40, p34/ARPC2/ARC35/p35, p21/ARPC3/ARC18/p19, p20/ARPC4/ARC19/p18, p16/ARPC5/ARC15/p14. The subunits Arp2 and Arp3 closely resemble monomeric actin allowing for a thermodynamically stable actin-like dimer. p41 has been proposed to interact with nucleation promoting factors (NPFs) because it is only known to have minor contacts with the mother filament and there is a major loss of nucleation efficiency in the absence of p41. p34 and p20 dimerize to form a structural backbone that mediates the interaction with the mother filament. p21 forms a bridge between Arp3 and the mother filament, increasing nucleation efficiency. p16 tethers Arp2 to the rest of the complex.

Some subunits of the Arp2/3 complex exist in multiple isoforms with distinct activities. For example, the ARPC1 subunit has two isoforms in mammals: ARPC1A and ARPC1B. The latter appears particularly important for maturation of platelets. Similarly, ARPC5 has a homolog ARPC5L (ARPC5-like). Compared to ARPC5, ARPC5L supports more rapid and dynamic reorganization of filaments in regions such as lamellipodia involved in cell motility.

== Structural insights ==
The Arp2/3 complex is composed of seven subunits: two actin-related proteins (Arp2 and Arp3) and five additional subunits (ARPC1–ARPC5). In its inactive state, the complex adopts a compact conformation where Arp2 and Arp3 are spatially separated and not aligned in a way that mimics an actin dimer. This conformation prevents spontaneous actin nucleation.

Upon activation by nucleation-promoting factors (NPFs)—such as WASP—the Arp2/3 complex undergoes a dramatic conformational rearrangement. Cryo-electron microscopy and molecular dynamics simulations have revealed that the binding of NPFs and ATP induces repositioning of Arp2 and Arp3 into a short-pitch actin-like dimer, the geometry required for nucleating a new actin filament branch. This transition forms a structural "template" that resembles a barbed-end actin nucleus, which then elongates by recruiting actin monomers.

The core subunits, particularly ARPC2 and ARPC4, form a structural scaffold that binds the side of an existing ("mother") actin filament at a 70-degree angle. This binding provides the platform from which a new ("daughter") filament can branch. Structural data show that ATP binding is essential for this transition.

== Cellular and physiological roles ==
The Arp2/3 complex is essential for the spatial and temporal regulation of actin cytoskeleton dynamics. One of the most well-characterized roles of the Arp2/3 complex is in cell motility, particularly through the formation of lamellipodia. This is vital in processes such as cell movement and vesicle trafficking. The complex, activated by nucleation-promoting factors like WASP and WAVE, catalyzes the branching of actin filaments to push the plasma membrane forward.

In neuronal development, the Arp2/3 complex plays a pivotal role in axon guidance, organization of radial glial cells, and dendritic spine formation. Disruption of Arp2/3 function in mouse models leads to severe abnormalities in the cortical layering of neurons, loss of neuronal polarity, and impaired synaptic plasticity, indicating that actin nucleation is critical for establishing and maintaining neuronal networks.

In the immune system, Arp2/3-mediated actin remodeling is necessary for phagocytosis, immune synapse formation, and cell migration.
