= Filopodia =

Actin projections on the leading edge of lamellipodia of migrating cells

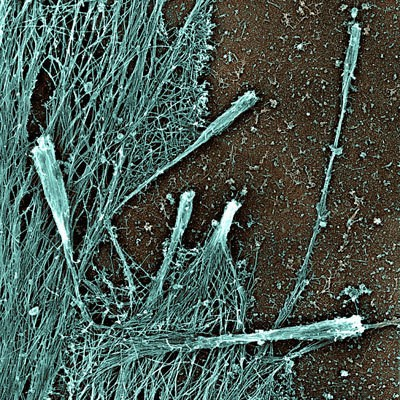
This electron micrograph shows exaggerated filopodia with club-like shape induced by formin mDia2 in cultured cells. These filopodia are filled with bundled actin filaments which were born in and converged from the lamellipodial network.

Filopodia (sing.: filopodium) are slender cytoplasmic projections that extend beyond the leading edge of lamellipodia in migrating cells. Within the lamellipodium, actin ribs are known as microspikes, and when they extend beyond the lamellipodia, they're known as filopodia. They contain microfilaments (also called actin filaments) cross-linked into bundles by actin-bundling proteins, such as fascin and fimbrin. Filopodia form focal adhesions with the substratum, linking them to the cell surface. Many types of migrating cells display filopodia, which are thought to be involved in both sensation of chemotropic cues, and resulting changes in directed locomotion.

Activation of the Rho family of GTPases, particularly Cdc42 and their downstream intermediates, results in the polymerization of actin fibers by Ena/Vasp homology proteins. Growth factors bind to receptor tyrosine kinases resulting in the polymerization of actin filaments, which, when cross-linked, make up the supporting cytoskeletal elements of filopodia. Rho activity also results in activation by phosphorylation of ezrin-moesin-radixin family proteins that link actin filaments to the filopodia membrane.

Filopodia have roles in sensing, migration, neurite outgrowth, and cell-cell interaction. To close a wound in vertebrates, growth factors stimulate the formation of filopodia in fibroblasts to direct fibroblast migration and wound closure. In macrophages, filopodia act as phagocytic tentacles, pulling bound objects towards the cell for phagocytosis.

== Functions and variants ==
Many cell types have filopodia. The functions of filopodia have been attributed to pathfinding of neurons, early stages of synapse formation, antigen presentation by dendritic cells of the immune system, force generation by macrophages and virus transmission. They have been associated with wound closure, dorsal closure of Drosophila embryos, chemotaxis in Dictyostelium, Delta-Notch signaling, vasculogenesis, cell adhesion, cell migration, and cancer metastasis. Specific kinds of filopodia have been given various names: microspikes, pseudopods, thin filopodia, thick filopodia, gliopodia, myopodia, invadopodia, podosomes, telopodes, tunneling nanotubes and dendrites.

== In infections ==
Filopodia are also used for movement of bacteria between cells, so as to evade the host immune system. The intracellular bacteria Ehrlichia are transported between cells through the host cell filopodia induced by the pathogen during initial stages of infection. Filopodia are the initial contact that human retinal pigment epithelial (RPE) cells make with elementary bodies of Chlamydia trachomatis, the bacteria that causes chlamydia.

Viruses have been shown to be transported along filopodia toward the cell body, leading to cell infection. Directed transport of receptor-bound epidermal growth factor (EGF) along filopodia has also been described, supporting the proposed sensing function of filopodia.

SARS-CoV-2, the strain of coronavirus responsible for COVID-19, produces filopodia in infected cells.

== In brain cells ==
In developing neurons, filopodia extend from the growth cone at the leading edge. In neurons deprived of filopodia by partial inhibition of actin filaments polymerization, growth cone extension continues as normal, but direction of growth is disrupted and highly irregular. Filopodia-like projections have also been linked to dendrite creation when new synapses are formed in the brain.

A study deploying protein imaging of adult mice showed that filopodia in the explored regions were by an order of magnitude more abundant than previously believed, comprising about 30% of all dendritic protrusions. At their tips, they contain "silent synapses" that are inactive until recruited as part of neural plasticity and flexible learning or memories, previously thought to be present mainly in the developing pre-adult brain and to die off with time.
