= ARPC2 =

Mammalian protein found in humans

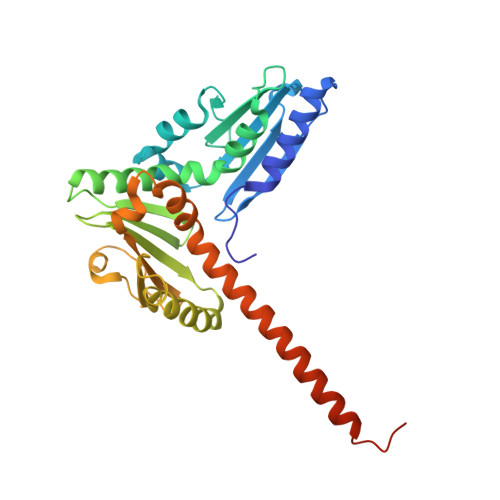

Identifiers
- Aliases: ARPC2, ARC34, PNAS-139, p34-Arc, PRO2446, actin related protein 2/3 complex subunit 2
- External IDs: OMIM: 604224; MGI: 1923959; GeneCards: ARPC2

Gene location (Human)
| Chr. | Chromosome 2 (human) |
| Band | 2q35 | Start | 218,217,141 bp |
| Band | 2q35 | End | 218,254,356 bp |

Gene location (Mouse)
| Chr. | Chromosome 1 (mouse) |
| Band | 1 38.49 cM|1 C3 | Start | 74,275,243 bp |
| Band | 1 38.49 cM|1 C3 | End | 74,307,368 bp |
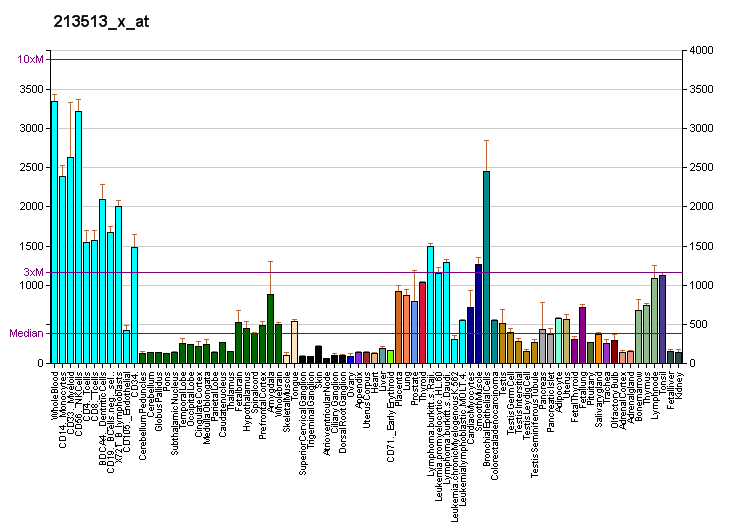

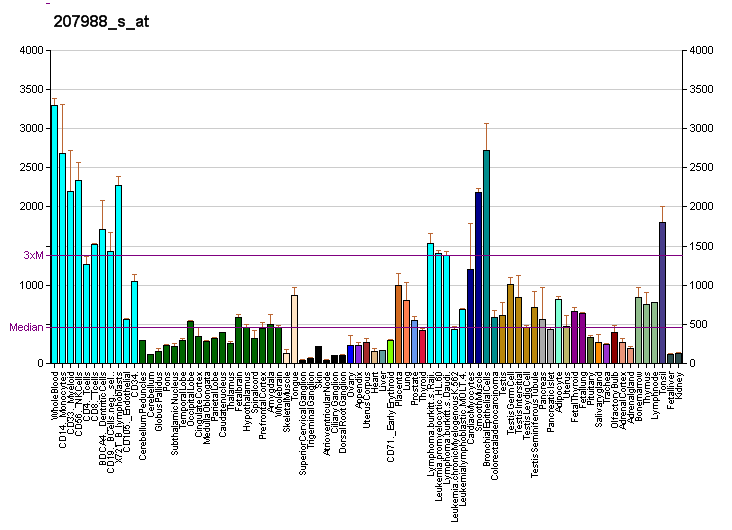

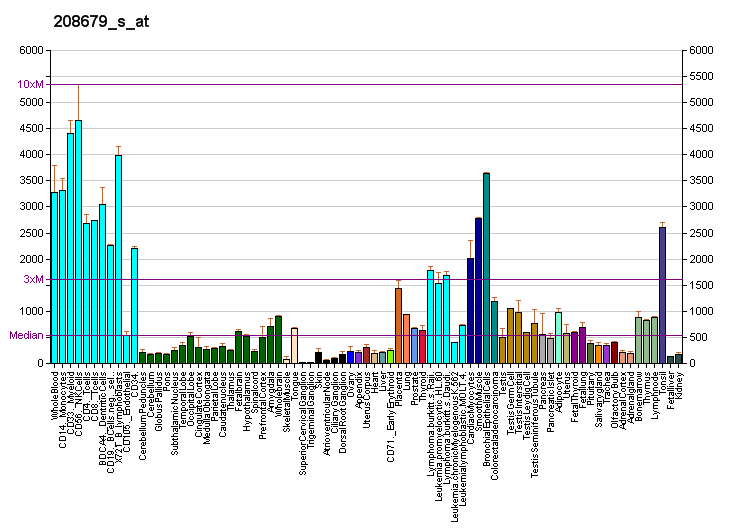
RNA expression pattern
| Bgee | Human / Mouse (ortholog); Top expressed in: mucosa of sigmoid colon; granulocyte; mucosa of pharynx; skin of hip; trabecular bone; oral cavity; monocyte; blood; vulva; appendix / Top expressed in: saccule; Ileal epithelium; otic placode; otic vesicle; corneal stroma; tibiofemoral joint; gastrula; stroma of bone marrow; granulocyte; mesenteric lymph nodes; More reference expression data |
| BioGPS | More reference expression data |
Gene ontology
| Molecular function | actin filament binding; structural constituent of cytoskeleton; protein binding; actin binding |
| Cellular component | cytosol; endosome; cell projection; muscle cell projection membrane; focal adhesion; plasma membrane; Arp2/3 Protein Complex; synapse; cell junction; cell leading edge; actin cytoskeleton; neuron projection; extracellular exosome; cytoskeleton; cytoplasm; nucleus; lamellipodium; site of double-strand break; glutamatergic synapse |
| Biological process | positive regulation of actin filament polymerization; Fc-gamma receptor signaling pathway involved in phagocytosis; ephrin receptor signaling pathway; regulation of actin filament polymerization; positive regulation of substrate adhesion-dependent cell spreading; Arp2/3 complex-mediated actin nucleation; positive regulation of lamellipodium assembly; membrane organization; actin filament polymerization; actin polymerization-dependent cell motility |
Sources:Amigo / QuickGO
Orthologs
| Databases | NCBI: entry; OMA: entry |
| Species | Human | Mouse |
| Entrez | 10109 | 76709 |
| Ensembl | ENSG00000163466 | ENSMUSG00000006304 |
| UniProt | O15144 | Q9CVB6 |
| RefSeq (mRNA) | NM_005731; NM_152862 | NM_029711; NM_001357387 |
| RefSeq (protein) | NP_005722; NP_690601 | NP_083987; NP_001344316 |
| Location (UCSC) | Chr 2: 218.22 – 218.25 Mb | Chr 1: 74.28 – 74.31 Mb |
| PubMed search |
- Wikidata
| View/Edit Human | View/Edit Mouse |

Actin-related protein 2/3 complex subunit 2 is a protein that in humans is encoded by the ARPC2 gene.

== Function ==
This gene encodes one of seven subunits of the human Arp2/3 protein complex. The Arp2/3 protein complex has been implicated in the control of actin polymerization in cells and has been conserved through evolution. The exact role of the protein encoded by this gene, the p34 subunit, has yet to be determined. Two alternatively spliced variants have been characterized to date. Additional alternatively spliced variants have been described but their full length nature has not been determined.

== Interactions ==
ARPC2 has been shown to interact with Cortactin.
