= ARPC3 =

Protein-coding gene in humans

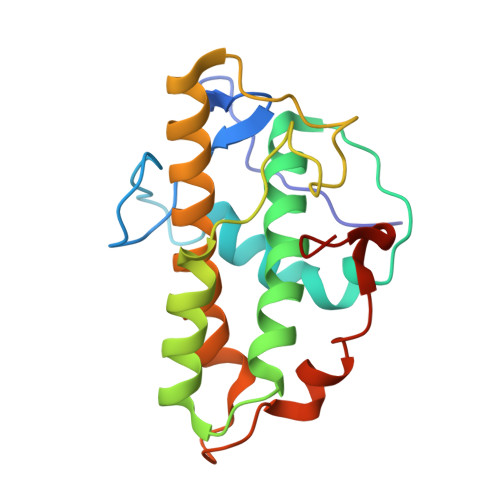
Available structures
PDB	Ortholog search: PDBe RCSB
PDB	List of PDB id codes 2P9N, 1TYQ, 1U2V, 4JD2, 3DXK, 3UKU, 3UKR, 2P9P, 2P9K, 2P9U, 3ULE, 3RSE, 2P9S, 2P9I, 4XF2, 2P9L, 1K8K, 3DXM, 4XEI

Identifiers
- Aliases: ARPC3, ARC21, p21-Arc, actin related protein 2/3 complex subunit 3
- External IDs: OMIM: 604225; MGI: 1928375; HomoloGene: 4178; GeneCards: ARPC3; OMA:ARPC3 - orthologs

Gene location (Human)
Chr.	Chromosome 12 (human)
Band	12q24.11	Start	110,434,823 bp
Band	12q24.11	End	110,450,422 bp

Gene location (Mouse)
Chr.	Chromosome 5 (mouse)
Band	5|5 F	Start	122,529,941 bp
Band	5|5 F	End	122,552,247 bp
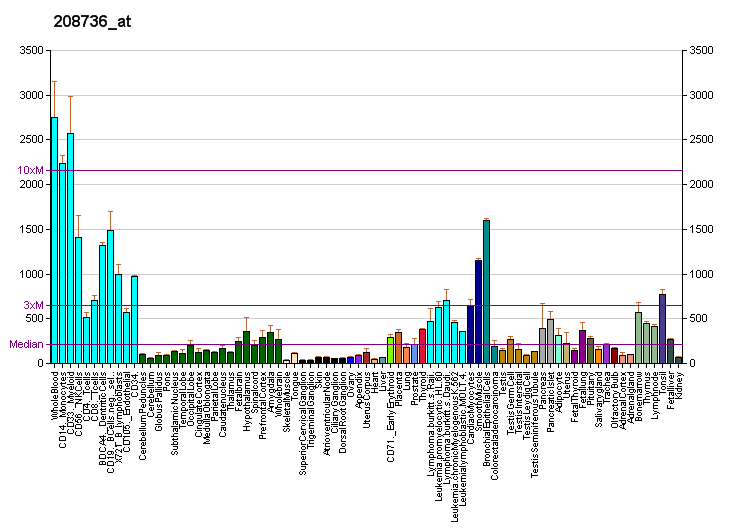
RNA expression pattern
Bgee	Human / Mouse (ortholog); Top expressed in: monocyte; granulocyte; appendix; rectum; islet of Langerhans; gallbladder; right lung; mucosa of transverse colon; olfactory zone of nasal mucosa; smooth muscle tissue / Top expressed in: granulocyte; superior surface of tongue; mesenteric lymph nodes; stroma of bone marrow; endothelial cell of lymphatic vessel; right lung lobe; thymus; mucous cell of stomach; spleen; medial ganglionic eminence; More reference expression data
BioGPS	More reference expression data
Gene ontology
Molecular function	actin filament binding; structural constituent of cytoskeleton; protein binding; actin binding
Cellular component	cytoplasm; cytosol; cell projection; membrane; focal adhesion; arp2/3 protein complex; actin cytoskeleton; extracellular exosome; cytoskeleton; lamellipodium; cell leading edge; filamentous actin; growth cone leading edge; nucleus; site of double-strand break
Biological process	Fc-gamma receptor signaling pathway involved in phagocytosis; ephrin receptor signaling pathway; regulation of actin filament polymerization; Arp2/3 complex-mediated actin nucleation; cellular response to nerve growth factor stimulus; membrane organization; actin polymerization-dependent cell motility
Sources:Amigo / QuickGO
Orthologs
Species	Human	Mouse
Entrez	10094	56378
Ensembl	ENSG00000111229	ENSMUSG00000029465
UniProt	O15145	Q9JM76
RefSeq (mRNA)	NM_001287222; NM_001278556	NM_019824
RefSeq (protein)	NP_001265485; NP_001274151	NP_062798
Location (UCSC)	Chr 12: 110.43 – 110.45 Mb	Chr 5: 122.53 – 122.55 Mb
PubMed search
- Wikidata
View/Edit Human	View/Edit Mouse

ARP2/3 complex ARPC3 (21 kDa) subunit
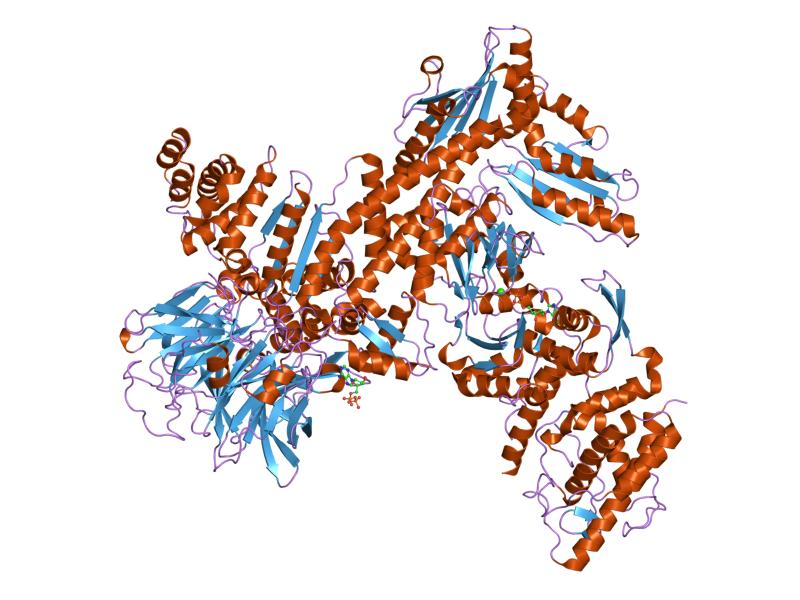
- crystal structure of arp2/3 complex with bound adp and calcium

Identifiers
- Symbol: P21-Arc
- Pfam: PF04062
- InterPro: IPR007204
Available protein structures:
- Pfam: structures / ECOD
- PDB: RCSB PDB; PDBe; PDBj
- PDBsum: structure summary

Actin-related protein 2/3 complex subunit 3 is a protein that in humans is encoded by the ARPC3 gene.

This gene encodes one of seven subunits of the Arp2/3 protein complex. The Arp2/3 protein complex has been implicated in the control of actin polymerization in cells and has been conserved through evolution. The exact role of the protein encoded by this gene, the p21 subunit, has yet to be determined.
