= ARPC4 =

Protein-coding gene in the species Homo sapiens

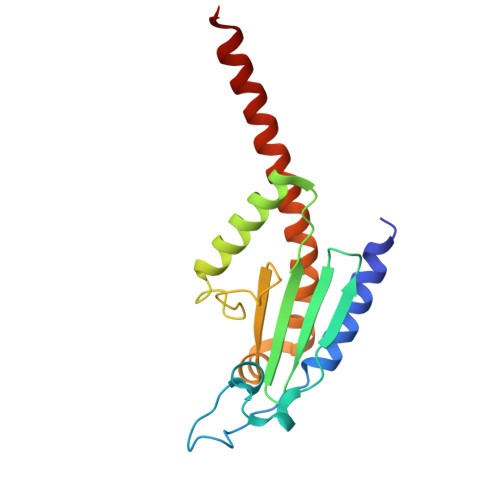

Identifiers
- Aliases: ARPC4, ARC20, P20-ARC, actin related protein 2/3 complex subunit 4
- External IDs: OMIM: 604226; MGI: 1915339; GeneCards: ARPC4
Available structures
PDB	Ortholog search: PDBe RCSB
PDB	List of PDB id codes 2P9N, 1TYQ, 1U2V, 4JD2, 3DXK, 3UKU, 3UKR, 2P9P, 2P9K, 2P9U, 3ULE, 3RSE, 2P9S, 2P9I, 4XF2, 2P9L, 1K8K, 3DXM, 4XEI

Gene location (Human)
Chr.	Chromosome 3 (human)
Band	3p25.3	Start	9,792,495 bp
Band	3p25.3	End	9,807,101 bp

Gene location (Mouse)
Chr.	Chromosome 6 (mouse)
Band	6|6 E3	Start	113,355,076 bp
Band	6|6 E3	End	113,367,409 bp
RNA expression pattern
Bgee	Human / Mouse (ortholog); Top expressed in: monocyte; granulocyte; rectum; smooth muscle tissue; mucosa of transverse colon; right coronary artery; Descending thoracic aorta; gallbladder; tibial arteries; islet of Langerhans / Top expressed in: granulocyte; blastocyst; lip; primary visual cortex; dentate gyrus of hippocampal formation granule cell; superior frontal gyrus; thymus; mesenteric lymph nodes; stroma of bone marrow; right kidney; More reference expression data
BioGPS	n/a
Gene ontology
Molecular function	enzyme binding; protein-macromolecule adaptor activity; actin filament binding; actin binding; structural constituent of cytoskeleton; protein binding
Cellular component	cytoplasm; cytosol; Arp2/3 Protein Complex; cell projection; extracellular exosome; cytoskeleton; actin cytoskeleton; nucleus; site of double-strand break
Biological process	ephrin receptor signaling pathway; actin filament polymerization; actin nucleation; Fc-gamma receptor signaling pathway involved in phagocytosis; Arp2/3 complex-mediated actin nucleation; membrane organization; regulation of actin filament polymerization
Sources:Amigo / QuickGO
Orthologs
Databases	NCBI: entry; OMA: entry
Species	Human	Mouse
Entrez	10093	68089
Ensembl	ENSG00000241553	ENSMUSG00000079426
UniProt	P59998	P59999
RefSeq (mRNA)	NM_005718; NM_001024959; NM_001024960; NM_001198780	NM_001170485; NM_001170486; NM_026552
RefSeq (protein)	NP_001020130; NP_001020131; NP_001185709; NP_005709	NP_001163956; NP_001163957; NP_080828
Location (UCSC)	Chr 3: 9.79 – 9.81 Mb	Chr 6: 113.36 – 113.37 Mb
PubMed search
- Wikidata
View/Edit Human	View/Edit Mouse

Actin-related protein 2/3 complex subunit 4 is a protein that in humans is encoded by the ARPC4 gene.

== Function ==
This gene encodes one of seven subunits of the human Arp2/3 protein complex. The Arp2/3 protein complex has been implicated in the control of actin polymerization in cells and has been conserved through evolution. The exact role of the protein encoded by this gene, the p20 subunit, has yet to be determined. Three transcript variants encoding two distinct isoforms have been found for this gene.

== Interactions ==
ARPC4 has been shown to interact with ARPC5.
