= ARPC5 =

Protein-coding gene in humans

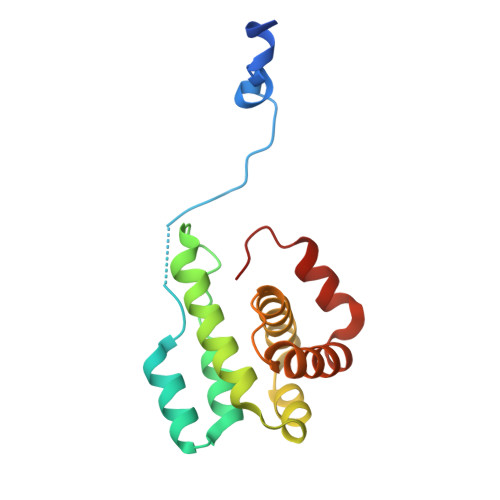

Identifiers
- Aliases: ARPC5, ARC16, dJ127C7.3, p16-Arc, actin related protein 2/3 complex subunit 5
- External IDs: OMIM: 604227; MGI: 1915021; GeneCards: ARPC5

Gene location (Human)
Chr.	Chromosome 1 (human)
Band	1q25.3	Start	183,620,846 bp
Band	1q25.3	End	183,635,783 bp

Gene location (Mouse)
Chr.	Chromosome 1 (mouse)
Band	1|1 G3	Start	152,642,293 bp
Band	1|1 G3	End	152,651,348 bp
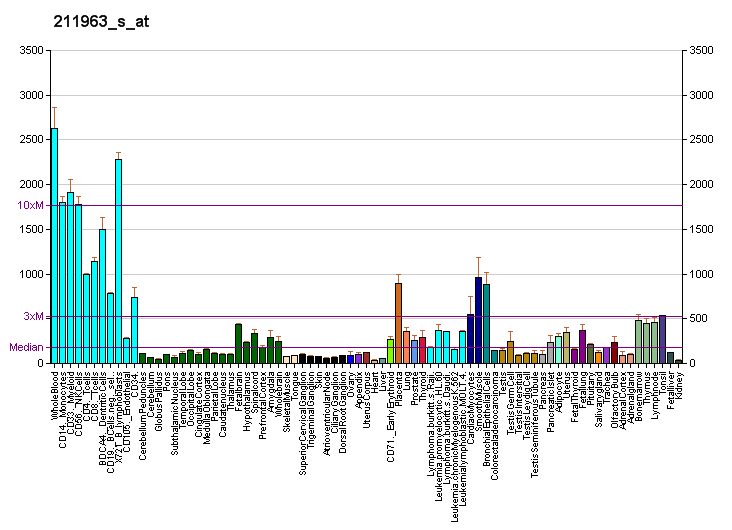
RNA expression pattern
Bgee	Human / Mouse (ortholog); Top expressed in: monocyte; germinal epithelium; lower lobe of lung; blood; superficial temporal artery; appendix; trabecular bone; granulocyte; lymph node; placenta / Top expressed in: granulocyte; ileum; spleen; thymus; stomach; ganglionic eminence; jejunum; neural tube; mesencephalon; placenta; More reference expression data
BioGPS	More reference expression data
Gene ontology
Molecular function	actin filament binding; structural constituent of cytoskeleton; protein binding; actin binding
Cellular component	cytoplasm; cytosol; cell projection; focal adhesion; Arp2/3 Protein Complex; actin cytoskeleton; extracellular exosome; cytoskeleton; neuron projection; extracellular region; endosome; growth cone; secretory granule lumen; ficolin-1-rich granule lumen; lamellipodium; nucleus; site of double-strand break
Biological process	Fc-gamma receptor signaling pathway involved in phagocytosis; ephrin receptor signaling pathway; regulation of actin filament polymerization; Arp2/3 complex-mediated actin nucleation; cell migration; actin cytoskeleton organization; actin filament network formation; orbitofrontal cortex development; lamellipodium organization; smooth muscle cell migration; maintenance of cell polarity; neutrophil degranulation; membrane organization; microtubule organizing center localization
Sources:Amigo / QuickGO
Orthologs
Databases	NCBI: entry; OMA: entry
Species	Human	Mouse
Entrez	10092	67771
Ensembl	ENSG00000162704	ENSMUSG00000008475
UniProt	O15511	Q9CPW4
RefSeq (mRNA)	NM_005717; NM_001270439	NM_026369
RefSeq (protein)	NP_001257368; NP_005708	NP_080645
Location (UCSC)	Chr 1: 183.62 – 183.64 Mb	Chr 1: 152.64 – 152.65 Mb
PubMed search
- Wikidata
View/Edit Human	View/Edit Mouse

Actin-related protein 2/3 complex subunit 5 is a protein that in humans is encoded by the ARPC5 gene.

== Function ==
This gene encodes one of seven subunits of the human Arp2/3 protein complex. The Arp2/3 protein complex has been implicated in the control of actin polymerization in cells and has been conserved through evolution. The exact role of the protein encoded by this gene, the p16 subunit, has yet to be determined.

== Interactions ==
ARPC5 has been shown to interact with ARPC4.
