= Actin nucleation-promoting factor WASL =

Mammalian protein found in humans

WASL
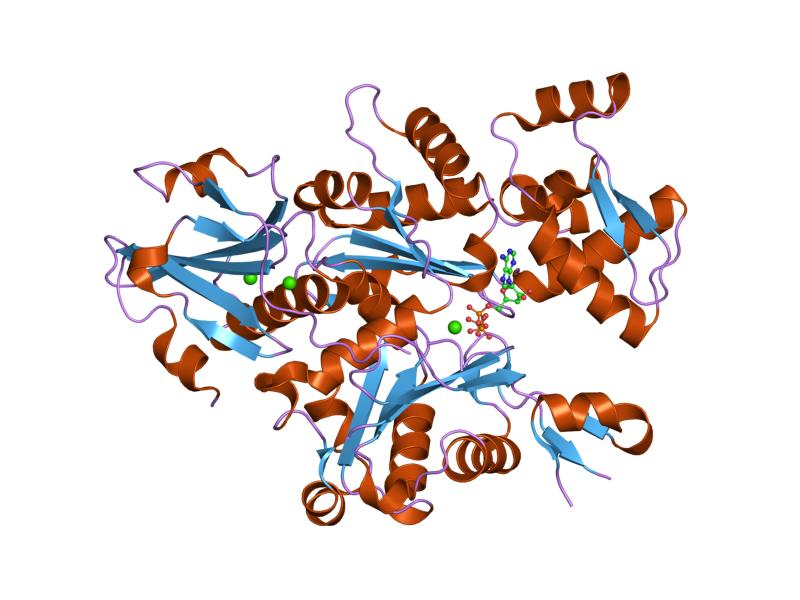

Identifiers
- Aliases: WASL, N-WASP, NWASP, WASPB, WASL (gene), Wiskott-Aldrich syndrome like, WASP like actin nucleation promoting factor
- External IDs: OMIM: 605056; MGI: 1920428; GeneCards: WASL
Available structures
PDB	Ortholog search: PDBe RCSB
PDB	List of PDB id codes 2FF3, 2LNH, 2VCP, 4CC2, 4CC7

Gene location (Human)
Chr.	Chromosome 7 (human)
Band	7q31.32	Start	123,681,943 bp
Band	7q31.32	End	123,749,003 bp

Gene location (Mouse)
Chr.	Chromosome 6 (mouse)
Band	6|6 A3.1	Start	24,613,804 bp
Band	6|6 A3.1	End	24,665,008 bp
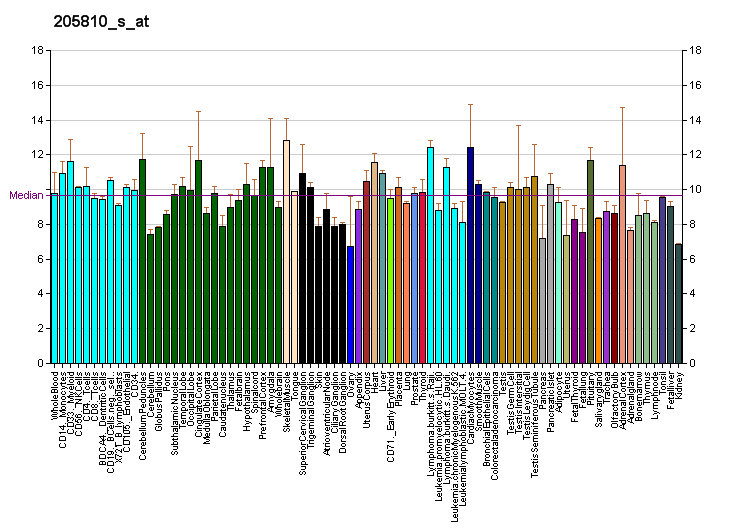
RNA expression pattern
Bgee	Human / Mouse (ortholog); Top expressed in: middle temporal gyrus; lateral nuclear group of thalamus; jejunal mucosa; Brodmann area 23; skin of thigh; mucosa of colon; mucosa of sigmoid colon; renal medulla; trigeminal ganglion; postcentral gyrus / Top expressed in: medullary collecting duct; Region I of hippocampus proper; renal corpuscle; ciliary body; retinal pigment epithelium; conjunctival fornix; vestibular membrane of cochlear duct; facial motor nucleus; Paneth cell; Epithelium of choroid plexus; More reference expression data
BioGPS	More reference expression data
Gene ontology
Molecular function	GTPase regulator activity; protein binding; actin binding
Cellular component	cytoplasm; endocytic vesicle membrane; cytosol; plasma membrane; actin cytoskeleton; actin cap; extracellular exosome; cytoskeleton; nucleus; lamellipodium; cytoplasmic vesicle
Biological process	negative regulation of membrane tubulation; regulation of transcription, DNA-templated; response to bacterium; Fc-gamma receptor signaling pathway involved in phagocytosis; vesicle organization; actin filament organization; ephrin receptor signaling pathway; regulation of nitric-oxide synthase activity; positive regulation of Arp2/3 complex-mediated actin nucleation; transcription, DNA-templated; regulation of protein localization; cell division; vesicle budding from membrane; positive regulation of clathrin-dependent endocytosis; vesicle transport along actin filament; cell cycle; actin polymerization or depolymerization; spindle localization; negative regulation of lymphocyte migration; positive regulation of filopodium assembly; actin cytoskeleton organization; membrane organization; dendritic spine morphogenesis
Sources:Amigo / QuickGO
Orthologs
Databases	NCBI: entry; OMA: entry
Species	Human	Mouse
Entrez	8976	73178
Ensembl	ENSG00000106299	ENSMUSG00000029684
UniProt	O00401	Q91YD9
RefSeq (mRNA)	NM_003941	NM_001167745; NM_028459
RefSeq (protein)	NP_003932	NP_001161217; NP_082735
Location (UCSC)	Chr 7: 123.68 – 123.75 Mb	Chr 6: 24.61 – 24.67 Mb
PubMed search
- Wikidata
View/Edit Human	View/Edit Mouse

Actin nucleation-promoting factor WASL, also known as Neural Wiskott–Aldrich syndrome protein, is a protein that in humans is encoded by the WASL gene.

The Wiskott–Aldrich syndrome (WAS) family of proteins share similar domain structure, and are involved in transduction of signals from receptors on the cell surface to the actin cytoskeleton. The presence of a number of different motifs suggests that they are regulated by a number of different stimuli, and interact with multiple proteins. Recent studies have demonstrated that these proteins, directly or indirectly, associate with the small GTPase, Cdc42, known to regulate formation of actin filaments, and the cytoskeletal organizing complex, Arp2/3. The WASL gene product is a homolog of WAS protein, however, unlike the latter, it is ubiquitously expressed and shows highest expression in neural tissues. It has been shown to bind Cdc42 directly, and induce formation of long actin microspikes.

According to one study, mouse DAB1 regulates actin cytoskeleton through N-WASP.

Diseases associated with WASL include Wiskottt–Aldrich syndrome and Vaccinia.

== Interactions ==
WASL (gene) has been shown to interact with:

- CDC42,
- Cortactin
- NCK1,
- Profilin 1, and
- RHOQ.
