= ACTR3 =

Mammalian protein found in humans

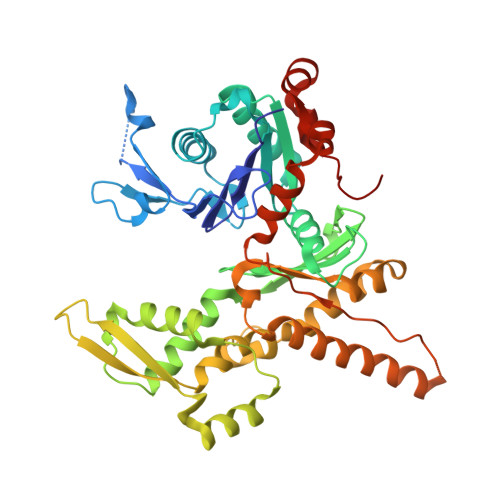

Identifiers
- Aliases: ACTR3, ARP3, ARP3 actin-related protein 3 homolog (yeast), ARP3 actin related protein 3 homolog, actin related protein 3
- External IDs: OMIM: 604222; MGI: 1921367; GeneCards: ACTR3
Available structures
PDB	Ortholog search: PDBe RCSB
PDB	List of PDB id codes 2P9N, 1TYQ, 1U2V, 4JD2, 3DXK, 3UKU, 3UKR, 2P9P, 2P9K, 2P9U, 3ULE, 3RSE, 2P9S, 2P9I, 4XF2, 2P9L, 1K8K, 3DXM, 4XEI

Gene location (Human)
Chr.	Chromosome 2 (human)
Band	2q14.1	Start	113,890,063 bp
Band	2q14.1	End	113,962,596 bp

Gene location (Mouse)
Chr.	Chromosome 1 (mouse)
Band	1|1 E2.3	Start	125,320,642 bp
Band	1|1 E2.3	End	125,363,464 bp
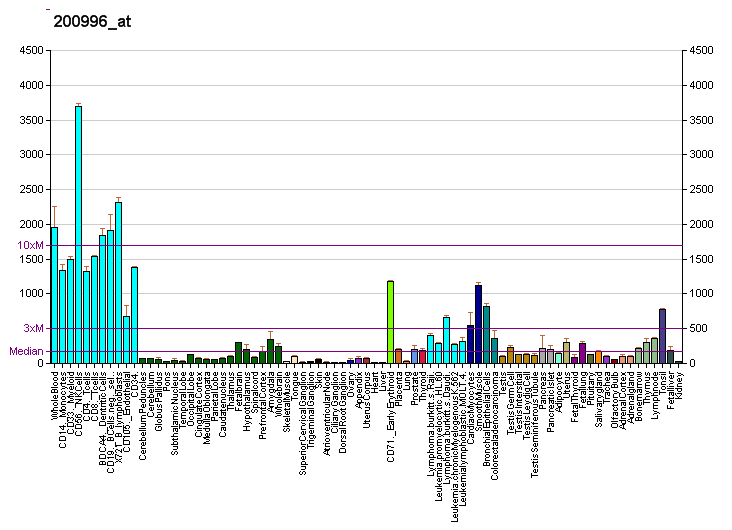

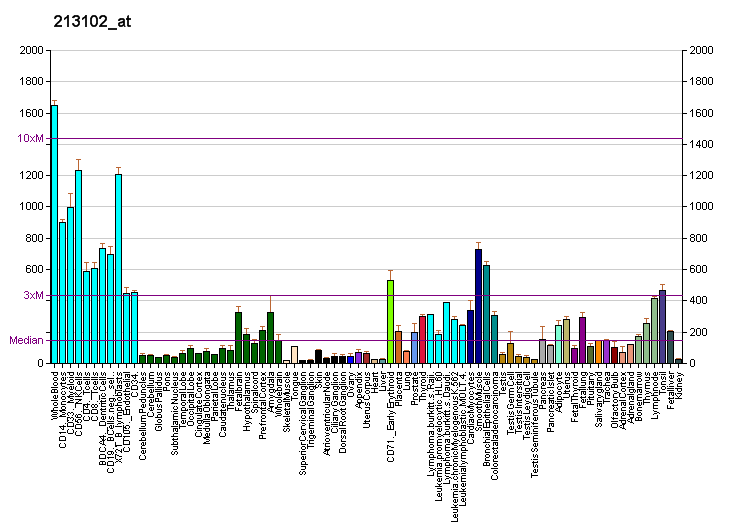

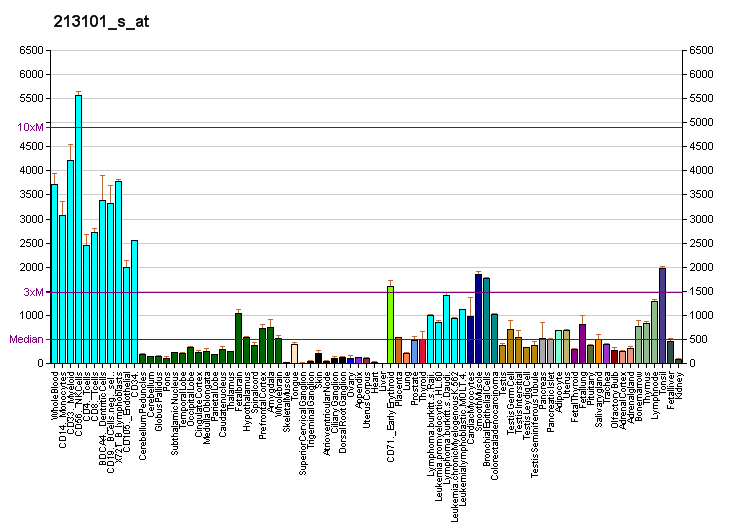
RNA expression pattern
Bgee	Human / Mouse (ortholog); Top expressed in: endothelial cell; sperm; trabecular bone; epithelium of nasopharynx; gums; gingival epithelium; secondary oocyte; oral cavity; appendix; amniotic fluid / Top expressed in: granulocyte; thymus; ileum; spleen; jejunum; dentate gyrus of hippocampal formation granule cell; placenta; uterus; colon; tail of embryo; More reference expression data
BioGPS	More reference expression data
Gene ontology
Molecular function	structural constituent of cytoskeleton; nucleotide binding; actin binding; actin filament binding; ATP binding; protein binding
Cellular component	extracellular exosome; brush border; actin cytoskeleton; cytoplasm; cell projection; cytosol; lamellipodium; cell-cell junction; membrane; focal adhesion; cytoskeleton; Arp2/3 Protein Complex
Biological process	Fc-gamma receptor signaling pathway involved in phagocytosis; ephrin receptor signaling pathway; cilium assembly; Arp2/3 complex-mediated actin nucleation; meiosis; spindle localization; asymmetric cell division; actin filament organization; cell projection organization; meiotic chromosome movement towards spindle pole; establishment or maintenance of cell polarity; meiotic cytokinesis; membrane organization
Sources:Amigo / QuickGO
Orthologs
Databases	NCBI: entry; OMA: entry
Species	Human	Mouse
Entrez	10096	74117
Ensembl	ENSG00000115091	ENSMUSG00000026341
UniProt	P61158	Q99JY9
RefSeq (mRNA)	NM_001277140; NM_005721	NM_001205385; NM_001205386; NM_023735
RefSeq (protein)	NP_001264069; NP_005712	NP_001192314; NP_001192315; NP_076224
Location (UCSC)	Chr 2: 113.89 – 113.96 Mb	Chr 1: 125.32 – 125.36 Mb
PubMed search
- Wikidata
View/Edit Human	View/Edit Mouse

Actin-related protein 3 is a protein that in humans is encoded by the ACTR3 gene.

== Function ==
The specific function of this gene has not yet been determined; however, the protein it encodes is known to be a major constituent of the ARP2/3 complex. This complex is located at the cell surface and is essential to cell shape and motility through lamellipodial actin assembly and protrusion.

== Interactions ==
ACTR3 has been shown to interact with Cortactin.
