= ARPC1B =

Mammalian protein found in Homo sapiens

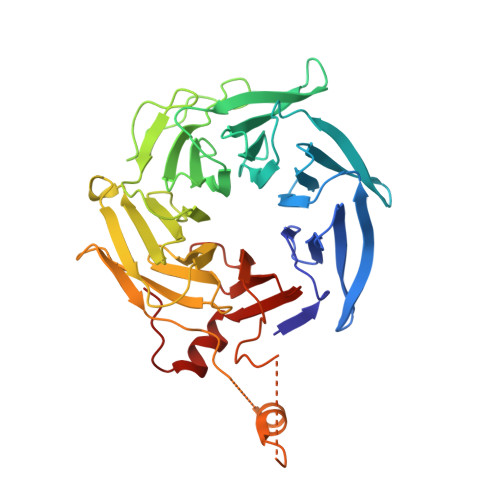

Identifiers
- Aliases: ARPC1B, ARC41, p40-ARC, p41-ARC, actin related protein 2/3 complex subunit 1B, PLTEID, IMD71
- External IDs: OMIM: 604223; MGI: 1343142; GeneCards: ARPC1B

Gene location (Human)
Chr.	Chromosome 7 (human)
Band	7q22.1	Start	99,374,249 bp
Band	7q22.1	End	99,394,816 bp

Gene location (Mouse)
Chr.	Chromosome 5 (mouse)
Band	5|5 G2	Start	145,051,025 bp
Band	5|5 G2	End	145,067,515 bp
RNA expression pattern
Bgee	Human / Mouse (ortholog); Top expressed in: monocyte; granulocyte; blood; spleen; lymph node; appendix; upper lobe of left lung; mucosa of transverse colon; right lung; duodenum / Top expressed in: granulocyte; stroma of bone marrow; mesenteric lymph nodes; gastrula; yolk sac; blastocyst; lip; tibiofemoral joint; migratory enteric neural crest cell; endothelial cell of lymphatic vessel; More reference expression data
BioGPS	n/a
Gene ontology
Molecular function	actin filament binding; actin binding; structural constituent of cytoskeleton; protein-containing complex binding; protein binding
Cellular component	cytoplasm; cytosol; Arp2/3 Protein Complex; extracellular exosome; cytoskeleton; focal adhesion; actin cytoskeleton; tubulobulbar complex; nucleus
Biological process	Arp2/3 complex-mediated actin nucleation; ephrin receptor signaling pathway; regulation of actin filament polymerization; Fc-gamma receptor signaling pathway involved in phagocytosis; response to estrogen; response to estradiol
Sources:Amigo / QuickGO
Orthologs
Databases	NCBI: entry; OMA: entry
Species	Human	Mouse
Entrez	10095	11867
Ensembl	ENSG00000130429	ENSMUSG00000029622
UniProt	O15143	Q9WV32
RefSeq (mRNA)	NM_005720	NM_023142
RefSeq (protein)	NP_005711	NP_075631
Location (UCSC)	Chr 7: 99.37 – 99.39 Mb	Chr 5: 145.05 – 145.07 Mb
PubMed search
- Wikidata
View/Edit Human	View/Edit Mouse

Actin-related protein 2/3 complex subunit 1B is a protein that in humans is encoded by the ARPC1B gene.

== Function ==
This gene encodes one of seven subunits of the human Arp2/3 protein complex. This subunit is a member of the SOP2 family of proteins and is most similar to the protein encoded by gene ARPC1A. The similarity between these two proteins suggests that they both may function as p41 subunit of the human Arp2/3 complex that facilitates branching of actin filaments in cells. Isoforms of the p41 subunit may adapt the functions of the complex to different cell types or developmental stages. Indeed, it has recently been shown that variants of the Arp2/3 complex differ in their ability to promote actin assembly, with complexes containing ARPC1B and ARPC5L being better at this than those containing ARPC1A and ARPC5. The differing functions of ARPC1A and ARPC1B are also evident in the recent discovery of patients with severe or total ARPC1B deficiency, who have platelet and immune system abnormalities yet survive, possibly due to a compensatory up-regulation of ARPC1A expression.

== Interactions ==
ARPC1B has been shown to interact with PAK1.
