= Treadmilling =

Simultaneous growth and breakdown on opposite ends of a protein filament

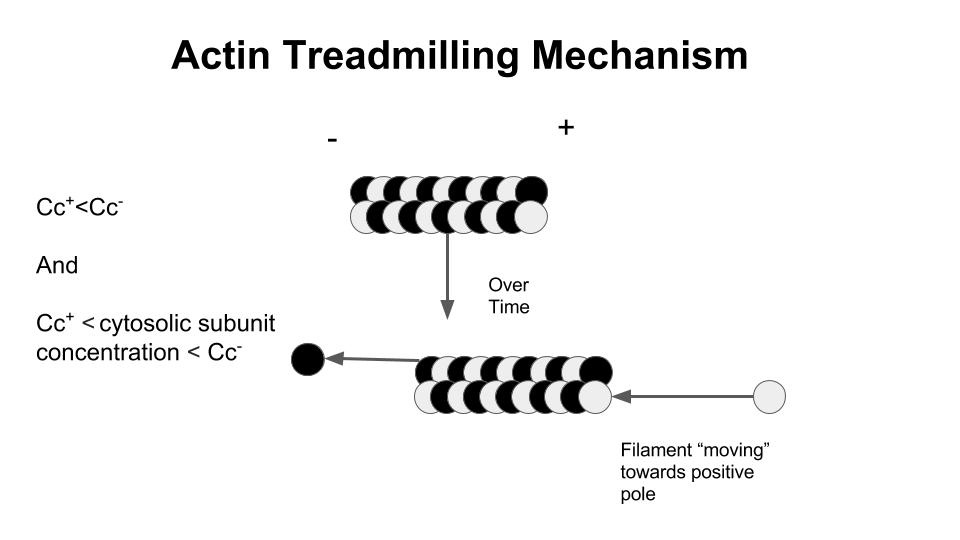
Actin Treadmilling Mechanism. This figure assumes that the critical concentration at the positive end is less than the critical concentration at the negative end and that the cytosolic subunit concentration is in between the positive and negative end critical concentrations.

In molecular biology, treadmilling is a phenomenon observed within protein filaments of the cytoskeletons of many cells, especially in actin filaments and microtubules. It occurs when one end of a filament grows in length while the other end shrinks, resulting in a section of filament seemingly "moving" across a stratum or the cytosol. This is due to the constant removal of the protein subunits from these filaments at one end of the filament, while protein subunits are constantly added at the other end. Treadmilling was discovered by Wegner, who defined the thermodynamic and kinetic constraints. Wegner recognized that: "The equilibrium constant (K) for association of a monomer with a polymer is the same at both ends, since the addition of a monomer to each end leads to the same polymer."; a simple reversible polymer can't treadmill; ATP hydrolysis is required. GTP is hydrolyzed for microtubule treadmilling.

== Detailed process ==
=== Dynamics of the filament ===
The cytoskeleton is a highly dynamic part of a cell and cytoskeletal filaments constantly grow and shrink through addition and removal of subunits. Directed crawling motion of cells such as macrophages relies on directed growth of actin filaments at the cell front (leading edge).

==== Microfilaments ====
The two ends of an actin filament differ in their dynamics of subunit addition and removal. They are thus referred to as the plus end (with faster dynamics, also called barbed end) and the minus end (with slower dynamics, also called pointed end). This difference results from the fact that subunit addition at the minus end requires a conformational change of the subunits. Note that each subunit is structurally polar and has to attach to the filament in a particular orientation. As a consequence, the actin filaments are also structurally polar.

Elongating the actin filament occurs when free-actin (G-actin) bound to ATP associates with the filament. Under physiological conditions, it is easier for G-actin to associate at the positive end of the filament, and harder at the negative end. However, it is possible to elongate the filament at either end. Association of G-actin into F-actin is regulated by the critical concentration outlined below. Actin polymerization can further be regulated by profilin and cofilin. Cofilin functions by binding to ADP-actin on the negative end of the filament, destabilizing it, and inducing depolymerization. Profilin induces ATP binding to G-actin so that it can be incorporated onto the positive end of the filament.

==== Microtubules ====
Two main theories exist on microtubule movement within the cell: dynamic instability and treadmilling. Dynamic instability occurs when the microtubule assembles and disassembles at one end only, while treadmilling occurs when one end polymerizes while the other end disassembles.

=== Critical concentration ===
The critical concentration is the concentration of either G-actin (actin) or the alpha,beta- tubulin complex (microtubules) at which the end will remain in an equilibrium state with no net growth or shrinkage. What determines whether the ends grow or shrink is entirely dependent on the cytosolic concentration of available monomer subunits in the surrounding area. Critical concentration differs from the plus (C_{C}^{+}) and the minus end (C_{C}^{−}), and under normal physiological conditions, the critical concentration is lower at the plus end than the minus end. Examples of how the cytosolic concentration relates to the critical concentration and polymerization are as follows:

- A cytosolic concentration of subunits above both the C_{C}^{+} and C_{C}^{−} ends results in subunit addition at both ends
- A cytosolic concentration of subunits below both the C_{C}^{+} and C_{C}^{−} ends results in subunit removal at both ends

Note that the cytosolic concentration of the monomer subunit between the C_{C}^{+} and C_{C}^{−} ends is what is defined as treadmilling in which there is growth at the plus end, and shrinking on the minus end.

The cell attempts to maintain a subunit concentration between the dissociation constants at the plus and minus ends of the polymer.

=== Microtubule treadmilling ===
Microtubules formed from pure tubulin undergo subunit uptake and loss at ends by both random exchange diffusion, and by a directional (treadmilling) element. Treadmilling is inefficient, and for microtubules at steady state: the Wegner s-value^{1} (the reciprocal of the number of molecular events required for the net uptake of a subunit) is equal to 0.0005-0.001; i.e., it requires >1000 events. Microtubule treadmilling with pure tubulin also occurs with growing microtubules and is enhanced by proteins that bind to ends^{11}. Rapid treadmilling occurs in cells.

FtsZ treadmilling

The bacterial tubulin homolog FtsZ is one of the best documented treadmilling polymers. FtsZ assembles into protofilaments that are one subunit thick, which can further associate into small patches of parallel protofilaments. Single filaments and/or patches have been demonstrated to treadmill in vitro and inside bacterial cells. A Monte Carlo model of FtsZ treadmilling has been designed, based on a conformational change of subunits upon polymerization and GTP hydrolysis.
