= Wiskott–Aldrich syndrome protein =

Mammalian protein found in humans

WAS
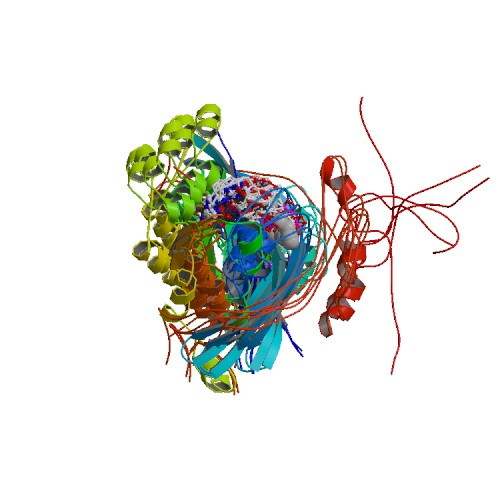

Identifiers
- Aliases: WAS, SCNX, THC, THC1, WASPA, WASp, IMD2, Wiskott-Aldrich syndrome, WASP actin nucleation promoting factor
- External IDs: OMIM: 300392; MGI: 105059; GeneCards: WAS
Available structures
PDB	Ortholog search: PDBe RCSB
PDB	List of PDB id codes 1CEE, 1EJ5, 1T84, 2A3Z, 2K42, 2OT0

Gene location (Human)
Chr.	X chromosome (human)
Band	Xp11.23	Start	48,676,596 bp
Band	Xp11.23	End	48,691,427 bp

Gene location (Mouse)
Chr.	X chromosome (mouse)
Band	X A1.1|X 3.65 cM	Start	7,947,692 bp
Band	X A1.1|X 3.65 cM	End	7,956,737 bp
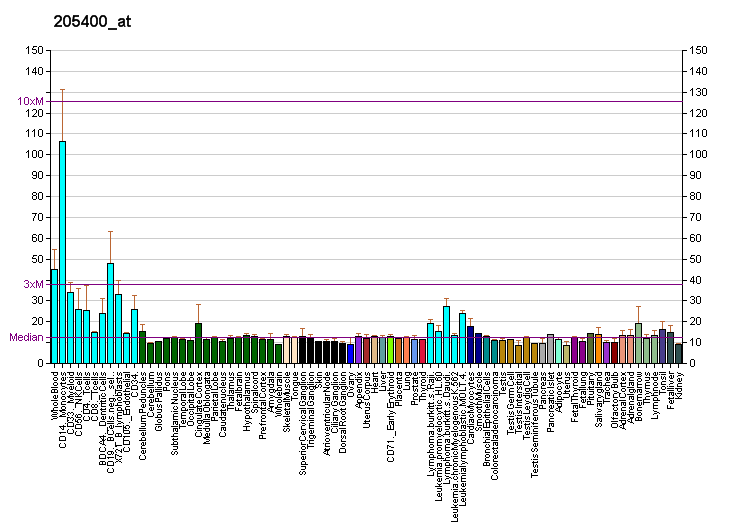

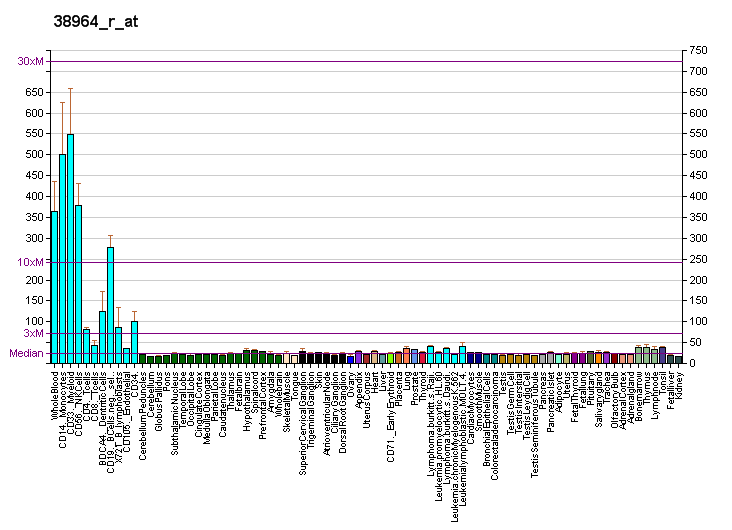
RNA expression pattern
Bgee	Human / Mouse (ortholog); Top expressed in: granulocyte; mononuclear cell; monocyte; blood; appendix; spleen; mucosa of ileum; bone marrow cell; lymph node; trabecular bone / Top expressed in: granulocyte; tibiofemoral joint; thymus; spleen; mesenteric lymph nodes; blood; bone marrow; stroma of bone marrow; lumbar subsegment of spinal cord; embryo; More reference expression data
BioGPS	More reference expression data
Gene ontology
Molecular function	phospholipase binding; GTPase regulator activity; SH3 domain binding; protein binding; identical protein binding; actin binding; protein kinase binding; small GTPase binding; actin filament binding
Cellular component	cytoplasm; cell-cell junction; vesicle membrane; actin cytoskeleton; extracellular exosome; cytoskeleton; cytosol; actin filament; nucleus; actin cortical patch; site of double-strand break; phagocytic vesicle
Biological process	defense response; Fc-gamma receptor signaling pathway involved in phagocytosis; actin filament organization; negative regulation of cell motility; blood coagulation; positive regulation of Arp2/3 complex-mediated actin nucleation; actin filament-based movement; endosomal transport; actin filament polymerization; regulation of T cell antigen processing and presentation; immune response; epidermis development; actin polymerization or depolymerization; T cell receptor signaling pathway; T cell activation; regulation of catalytic activity; Rho protein signal transduction; regulation of actin polymerization or depolymerization; regulation of lamellipodium assembly; Cdc42 protein signal transduction; regulation of stress fiber assembly; negative regulation of stress fiber assembly; actin cortical patch assembly; endocytosis; positive regulation of transcription by RNA polymerase II; positive regulation of actin nucleation; actin cortical patch localization; protein-containing complex assembly; cellular response to interferon-gamma; positive regulation of double-strand break repair via homologous recombination; regulation of double-strand break repair via nonhomologous end joining
Sources:Amigo / QuickGO
Orthologs
Databases	NCBI: entry; OMA: entry
Species	Human	Mouse
Entrez	7454	22376
Ensembl	ENSG00000015285	ENSMUSG00000031165
UniProt	P42768	P70315
RefSeq (mRNA)	NM_000377	NM_009515
RefSeq (protein)	NP_000368; NP_000368.1	NP_033541
Location (UCSC)	Chr X: 48.68 – 48.69 Mb	Chr X: 7.95 – 7.96 Mb
PubMed search
- Wikidata
View/Edit Human	View/Edit Mouse

The Wiskott–Aldrich syndrome protein (WASp), or Actin nucleation-promoting factor WAS is a 502–amino acid protein expressed in cells of the hematopoietic system that in humans is encoded by the WAS gene. In the inactive state, WASp exists in an autoinhibited conformation with sequences near its C-terminus binding to a region near its N-terminus. Its activation is dependent upon CDC42 and PIP_{2} acting to disrupt this interaction, causing the WASp protein to 'open'. This exposes a domain near the WASp C-terminus that binds to and activates the Arp2/3 complex. Activated Arp2/3 nucleates new F-actin.

WASp is the founding member of a gene family which also includes the broadly expressed N-WASP (neuronal Wiskott–Aldrich syndrome protein), SCAR1/WAVE1, WAVE2, WAVE3, WASH, WHAMM, and JMY. WAML (WASP and MIM like), WAWH (WASP without WH1 domain), and WHIMP (WAVE Homology in Membrane Protrusions) have more recently been discovered.

== Structure and function ==
The Wiskott–Aldrich syndrome (WAS) family of proteins share similar domain structure, and are involved in transduction of signals from receptors on the cell surface to the actin cytoskeleton. The presence of a number of different motifs suggests they are regulated by a number of different stimuli, and interact with multiple proteins. These proteins, directly or indirectly, associate with the small GTPase CDC42, known to regulate formation of actin filaments, and the cytoskeletal organising complex, Arp2/3.

The WASp family proteins includes WASp, N-WASp, SCAR/WAVE, WHAMM and WASH. The five of them share a C- terminal VCA (verprolin, central, acidic) domain where they interact with actin nucleating complex (ARP2/3) and they differ in their terminal domains. WASp and N-WASP are analogs, they contain an N-terminal EVH1 domain, a C-terminal VCA domain and central B and GBD (GTP binding domain) domains. WASp, is expressed exclusively in hematopoietic cells and neuronal WASp (N-WASp), is ubiquitously expressed. N-WASp contains an output region and a control region that are essential for its regulation. The output region is called the VVCA domain. It is located towards the C-terminal end of the protein and contains four motifs: two verprolin homology motifs (VV) binds actin monomers and delivers them to Arp2/3; the central domain (C) was once thought to bind cofilin but is now believed to enhance the interactions between the V domains and actin monomers, as well as the interaction between the A domain and Arp2/3; and the acidic motif (A) binds Arp2/3. In isolation, the VCA region is constitutively active. However, in full-length N-WASp the control region suppresses VCA domain activity. The control region is located at N-terminal end of N-WASp. The control region contains a CDC42-binding domain (GBP) and a PIP_{2}-binding domain (B), both of which are critical for proper regulation of N-WASp. Cooperative binding of CDC42 and PIP_{2} relieve the autoinhibition of N-WASp, causing Arp2/3 to carry out actin polymerization. WASp interacting protein (WIP) interacts with WASp N-terminal domain (WH1) preventing it from degradation and stabilising its auto-inhibitory conformation.

In the absence of CDC42 and PIP_{2}, N-WASp is in an inactive, locked conformation. Cooperative binding of both CDC42 and PIP_{2} relieve the autoinhibition. The cooperative binding of CDC42 and PIP_{2} is thermodynamically favored; binding of one enhances binding of the other. CDC42 and PIP_{2} localize the N-WASp-Arp2/3 complex to the plasma membrane. This localization ensures the actin polymers will be able to push through the plasma membrane and form filopodium required for cell motility.

WASp is required for various functions in myeloid and lymphoid immune cells. Many of these, such as phagocytosis and podosome formation, related to its role in regulating the polymerization of actin filaments. Other functions of WASP depend on its activity as a scaffold protein for assembly of effective signalling complexes downstream of antigen receptor or integrin engagement. Particularly in NK cells it participates in the synapse formation and polarization of perforin to the immune synapse for NK cell cytotoxicity. When WASp is absent or mutated T cells and B cells formation of immune synapse and TCR/BCR downstream signaling is also affected.

== Clinical significance ==
Wiskott–Aldrich syndrome is a rare, inherited, X-linked, recessive disease characterized by immune dysregulation and microthrombocytopenia, and is caused by mutations in the WASp gene. The WASp gene product is a cytoplasmic protein, expressed exclusively in hematopoietic cells, which show signalling and cytoskeletal abnormalities in WAS patients. A transcript variant arising as a result of alternative promoter usage, and containing a different 5' UTR sequence, has been described, but its full-length nature is not known.

WASp is a product of the WASp, and mutations in the WASp can lead to Wiskott–Aldrich syndrome (an X-linked disease that mainly affects males with symptoms that include thrombocytopenia, eczema, recurrent infections, and small-sized platelets) in these patients the protein is usually significantly reduced or absent. Other, less inactivating mutations affecting the WASp cause X-linked thrombocytopenia, or XLT, where there is usually detectable protein levels by flow cytometry. The majority of the mutations causing classic WAS are located in the WH1 domain of the protein and these mutations affect binding with the WASp Interacting Protein. Mutations located in the GBD domain disrupt autoinhibition and lead to an unfolded protein that is constitutively active. Unlike WAS and XLT, WASp in this case is present and active. Activated WASp leads to nuclear localization of actin filaments and this can lead to premature apoptosis, aneuploidy and failure to undergo cytokinesis. This, in turn, causes myelodysplasia and X-linked neutropenia.

A prospective gene therapy for Wiskott–Aldrich syndrome, OTL-103, uses autologous CD34+ lymphocytes that are transfected with a lentiviral vector to produce functional WASp. As of 28 June 2021, OTL-103 was undergoing Phase I/II clinical trials at the San Raffaele Hospital in Milan, Italy.

== Interactions ==
Wiskott–Aldrich syndrome protein has been shown to interact with:

- CDC42,
- CRKL,
- EGFR,
- FGR,
- FYN,
- Grb2,
- ITK
- ITSN2,
- NCK1,
- PIK3R1,
- PLCG1,
- PSTPIP1,
- Src,
- TRIP10, and
- WIPF1.

== See also ==
- Wiskott–Aldrich syndrome-like
- cortactin
