= COP9 constitutive photomorphogenic homolog subunit 5 =

Protein-coding gene in the species Homo sapiens

COPS5

Identifiers
- Aliases: COPS5, CSN5, JAB1, MOV-34, SGN5, COP9 constitutive photomorphogenic homolog subunit 5, COP9 signalosome subunit 5
- External IDs: OMIM: 604850; MGI: 1349415; GeneCards: COPS5
Available structures
| PDB | Ortholog search: PDBe RCSB |
| PDB | List of PDB id codes 4D10, 4D18, 4F7O, 4WSN |

Gene location (Human)
| Chr. | Chromosome 8 (human) |
| Band | 8q13.1 | Start | 67,043,079 bp |
| Band | 8q13.1 | End | 67,083,783 bp |

Gene location (Mouse)
| Chr. | Chromosome 1 (mouse) |
| Band | 1 A2|1 2.29 cM | Start | 10,094,826 bp |
| Band | 1 A2|1 2.29 cM | End | 10,108,393 bp |
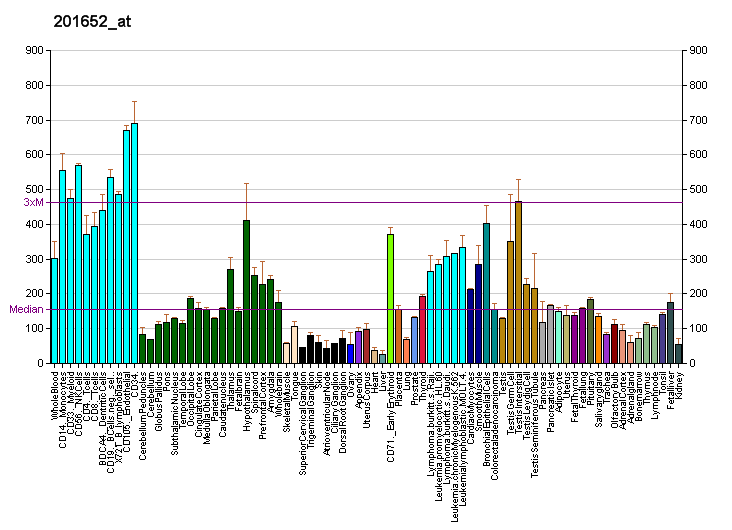

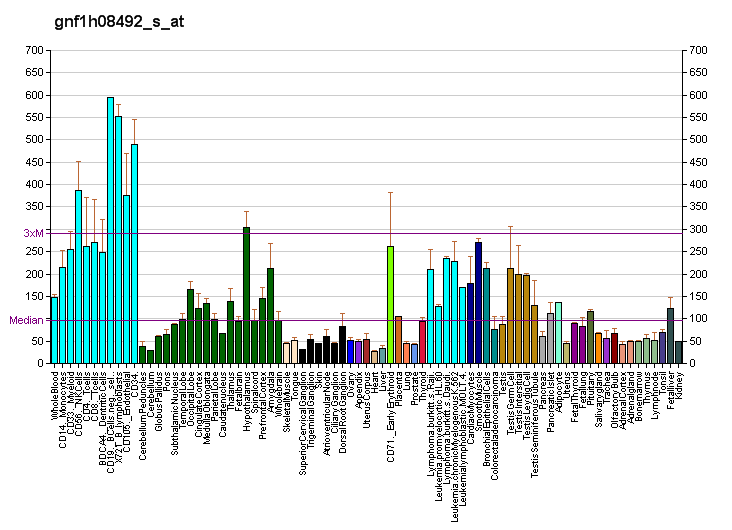
RNA expression pattern
| Bgee | Human / Mouse (ortholog); Top expressed in: sperm; right ventricle; myocardium of left ventricle; gastrocnemius muscle; biceps brachii; vastus lateralis muscle; Skeletal muscle tissue of rectus abdominis; Skeletal muscle tissue of biceps brachii; right testis; left testis / Top expressed in: genital tubercle; tail of embryo; medial ganglionic eminence; facial motor nucleus; temporal muscle; ventricular zone; lens; muscle of thigh; triceps brachii muscle; seminiferous tubule; More reference expression data |
| BioGPS | More reference expression data |
Gene ontology
| Molecular function | translation initiation factor activity; transcription coactivator activity; metal ion binding; peptidase activity; protein binding; thiol-dependent deubiquitinase; hydrolase activity; metallopeptidase activity; NEDD8-specific protease activity; enzyme binding; macrophage migration inhibitory factor binding; metalloendopeptidase activity |
| Cellular component | cytoplasm; eukaryotic translation initiation factor 3 complex; synaptic vesicle; synapse; nucleoplasm; cell junction; perinuclear region of cytoplasm; COP9 signalosome; cytoplasmic vesicle; nucleus; chromatin; cytosol |
| Biological process | protein biosynthesis; nucleotide-excision repair, DNA damage recognition; transcription by RNA polymerase II; proteolysis; regulation of cell cycle; protein deubiquitination; regulation of JNK cascade; exosomal secretion; transcription-coupled nucleotide-excision repair; regulation of IRE1-mediated unfolded protein response; positive regulation of transcription by RNA polymerase II; translational initiation; protein deneddylation; post-translational protein modification; negative regulation of apoptotic process; positive regulation of DNA-binding transcription factor activity |
Sources:Amigo / QuickGO
Orthologs
| Databases | NCBI: entry; OMA: entry |
| Species | Human | Mouse |
| Entrez | 10987 | 26754 |
| Ensembl | ENSG00000121022 | ENSMUSG00000025917 |
| UniProt | Q92905 | O35864 |
| RefSeq (mRNA) | NM_006837 | NM_001277101; NM_013715 |
| RefSeq (protein) | NP_006828; NP_006828.2 | NP_001264030; NP_038743 |
| Location (UCSC) | Chr 8: 67.04 – 67.08 Mb | Chr 1: 10.09 – 10.11 Mb |
| PubMed search |
- Wikidata
| View/Edit Human | View/Edit Mouse |

COP9 constitutive photomorphogenic homolog subunit 5 (Arabidopsis), also known as COPS5 or Csn5, is a gene conserved from humans to Saccharomyces cerevisiae.

== Function ==
The protein encoded by this gene is one of the eight subunits of COP9 signalosome, a highly conserved protein complex that functions as an important regulator in multiple signaling pathways. The structure and function of COP9 signalosome is similar to that of the 19S regulatory particle of 26S proteasome. COP9 signalosome has been shown to interact with SCF-type E3 ubiquitin ligases and act as a positive regulator of E3 ubiquitin ligases. This protein is reported to be involved in the degradation of cyclin-dependent kinase inhibitor CDKN1B/p27^{Kip1}. It is also known to be a coactivator that increases the specificity of JUN/AP1 transcription factors.

== Interactions ==
COP9 constitutive photomorphogenic homolog subunit 5 has been shown to interact with Macrophage migration inhibitory factor, GFER, BCL3, Ubiquitin carboxy-terminal hydrolase L1, S100A7 and C-jun.

== See also ==
- COPS1
- COPS2
- COPS3
- COPS4
- COPS6
- COPS7A
- COPS7B
- COPS8
