= CSN =

CSN may refer to:

== Companies ==
- CSN Stores, former name of Wayfair, American e-commerce company
- CSN International (Christian Satellite Network), religious radio broadcaster based on radio station KAWZ in Twin Falls, Idaho
- Centrala Studiestödsnämnden, Swedish national student loans and grants authority
- Columbus Sports Network (WCSN-LD), low-power television station in Columbus, Ohio
- Comcast SportsNet, former name of NBC Sports Regional Networks
- Comic Shop News, free weekly newspaper distributed throughout comic book specialty stores
- Companhia Siderúrgica Nacional, Brazilian steel maker

== Music ==
- Crosby, Stills & Nash, an American folk rock supergroup
  - CSN (album), 1977
  - CSN (box set), 1991

== Transport ==
- CSN, National Rail station code for Chessington North railway station, England
- Changsha South railway station, China Railway pinyin code CSN
- China Southern Airlines, China
- Chalisgaon Junction railway station (station code: CSN), Maharashtra, India

== Other uses ==
- Canaan Smith-Njigba (born 1999), American baseball player
- Cell Signaling Networks
- COP9 signalosome (CSN), a protein complex
  - CSN2
  - COP9 signalosome complex subunit 3 (CSN3)
- Coláiste an Spioraid Naoimh, a secondary school in Cork City, Ireland
- College of Southern Nevada, a community college located in Clark County
- Comunidad Sudamericana de Naciones, Union of South American Nations
- CSN.1, Concrete Syntax Notation, a telecommunications and computer networking standard
- Confederate States Navy
- Confédération des syndicats nationaux
- Corporate Sponsored Nominee, in the UK, a shareholder intermediary allowing shares to be held digitally without certificates
- Carlton Sports Network, a sports channel in Sri Lanka
- Czech technical standard (ČSN)

== Cities ==
- Chhatrapati Sambhajinagar Called as CSN
