= COP9 signalosome =

Protein complex

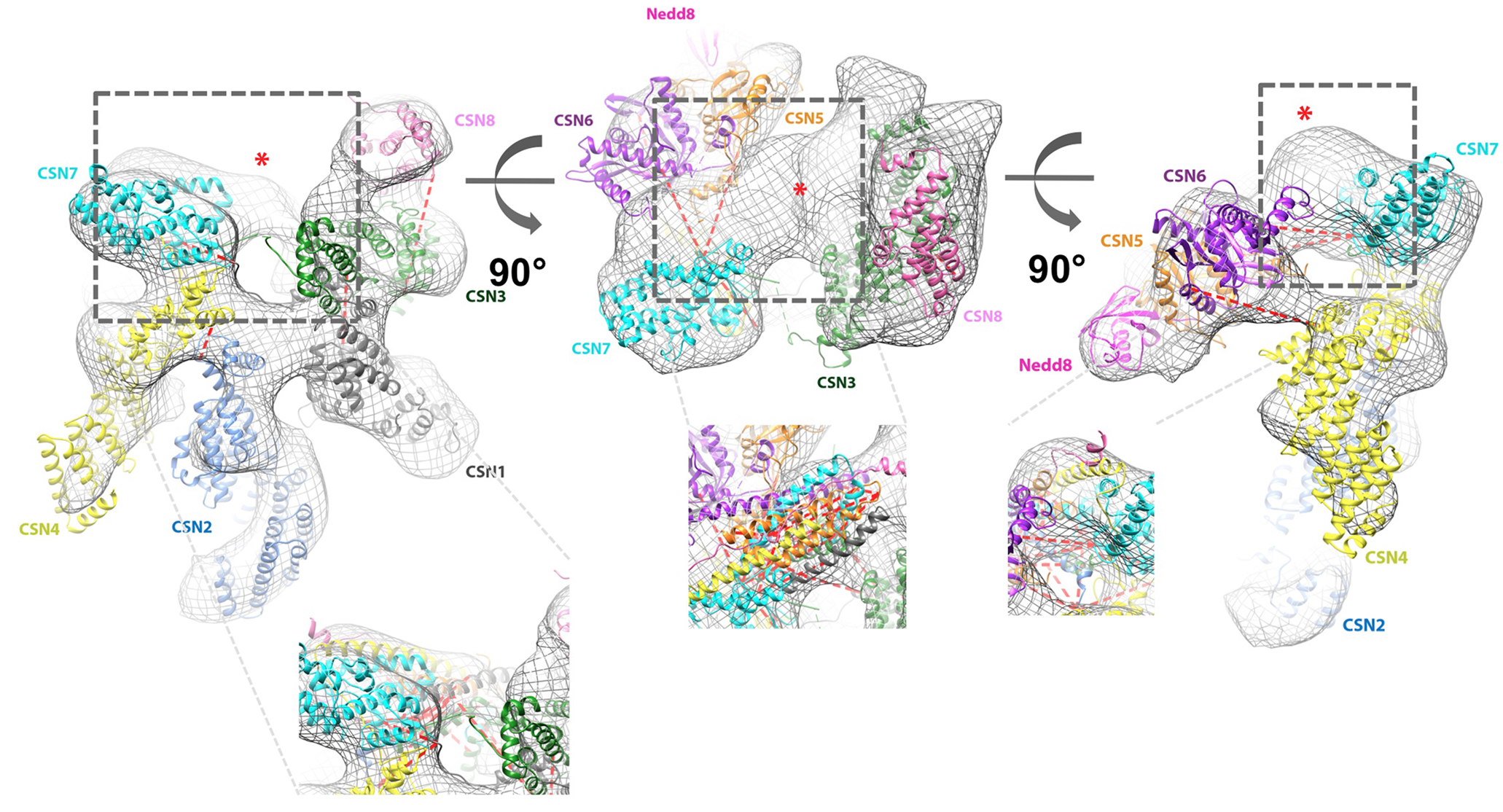
COP9 (Constitutive photomorphogenesis 9) signalosome structure

COP9 (Constitutive photomorphogenesis 9) signalosome (CSN) is a protein complex with isopeptidase activity. It catalyses the hydrolysis of NEDD8 protein from the cullin subunit of Cullin-RING ubiquitin ligases (CRL). Therefore, it is responsible for CRL deneddylation – at the same time, it is able to bind denedyllated cullin-RING complex and retain them in deactivated form. COP9 signalosome thus serves as a sole deactivator of CRLs. The complex was originally identified in plants, and subsequently found in all eukaryotic organisms including human. Human COP9 signalosome (total size ~350 kDa) consists of 8 subunits - CSN1, CSN2, CSN3, CSN4, CSN5, CSN6, CSN7 (COPS7A, COPS7B), CSN8. All are essential for full function of the complex and mutation in some of them is lethal in mice.

== COP9 signalosome as a drug target for cancer and parasitic infections ==
Given the essential functions of the COP9 signalosome, the complex has been explored as a target for drug discovery. Preclinical studies showed that inhibiting COP9 resulted in death of cancer cells and medically important parasite.
