= CDC42EP4 =

Protein-coding gene in humans

Identifiers
- Aliases: CDC42EP4, BORG4, CEP4, KAIA1777, CDC42 effector protein 4
- External IDs: OMIM: 605468; MGI: 1929760; GeneCards: CDC42EP4

Gene location (Human)
Chr.	Chromosome 17 (human)
Band	17q25.1	Start	73,283,624 bp
Band	17q25.1	End	73,312,005 bp

Gene location (Mouse)
Chr.	Chromosome 11 (mouse)
Band	11|11 E2	Start	113,617,676 bp
Band	11|11 E2	End	113,642,707 bp
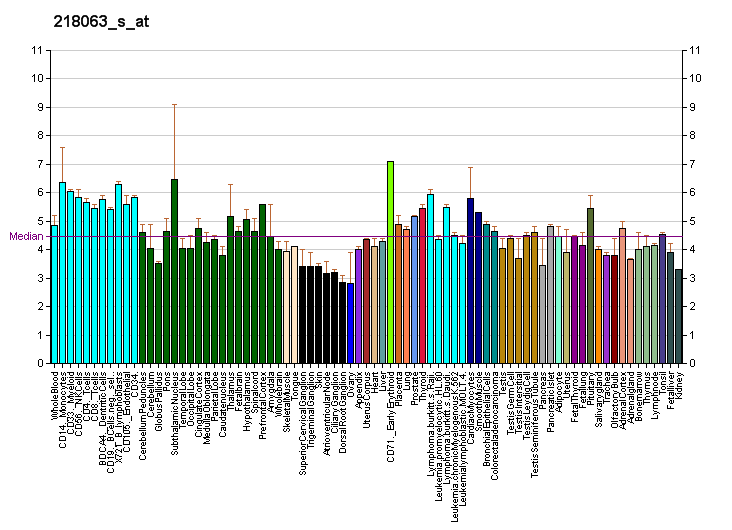

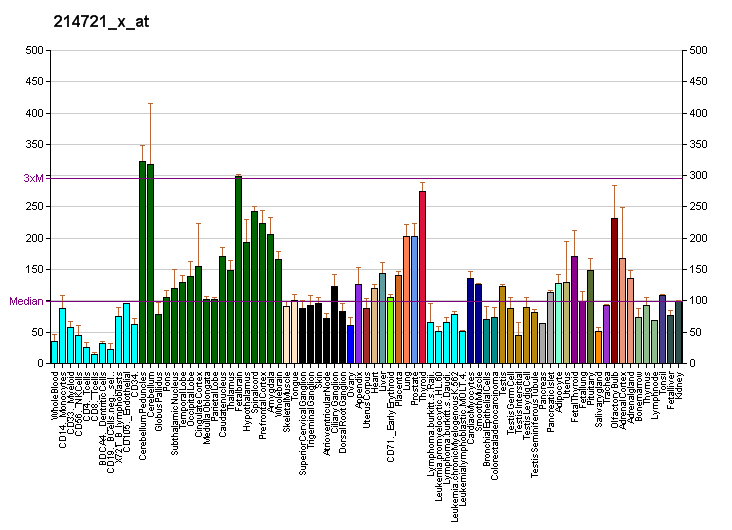

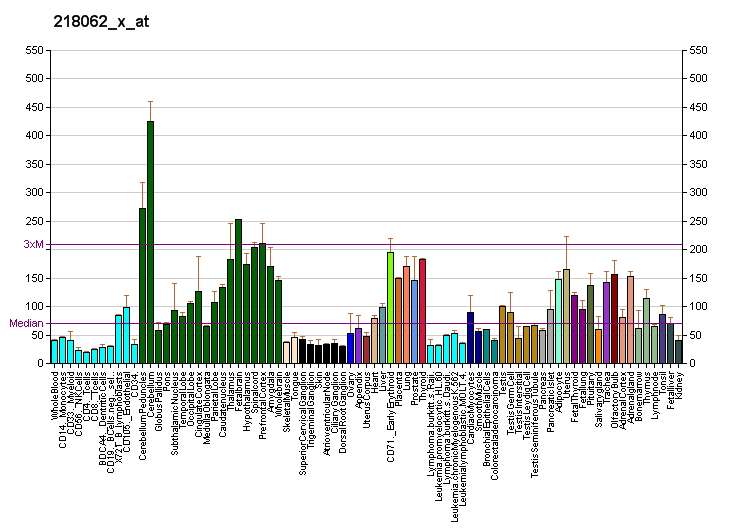
RNA expression pattern
Bgee	Human / Mouse (ortholog); Top expressed in: optic nerve; paraflocculus of cerebellum; olfactory bulb; left uterine tube; ventricular zone; middle frontal gyrus; olfactory zone of nasal mucosa; internal globus pallidus; corpus epididymis; external globus pallidus / Top expressed in: vestibular sensory epithelium; internal carotid artery; external carotid artery; vestibular membrane of cochlear duct; medullary collecting duct; Rostral migratory stream; spermatocyte; left lung lobe; ventricular zone; utricle; More reference expression data
BioGPS	More reference expression data
Gene ontology
Molecular function	protein binding; GTPase activator activity; RNA binding
Cellular component	endomembrane system; plasma membrane; cytoskeleton; microtubule cytoskeleton; membrane; actin cytoskeleton; cytoplasm; phagocytic vesicle
Biological process	positive regulation of actin filament polymerization; positive regulation of pseudopodium assembly; regulation of cell shape; Rho protein signal transduction; positive regulation of GTPase activity; cellular response to interferon-gamma
Sources:Amigo / QuickGO
Orthologs
Databases	NCBI: entry; OMA: entry
Species	Human	Mouse
Entrez	23580	56699
Ensembl	ENSG00000179604	ENSMUSG00000041598
UniProt	Q9H3Q1	Q9JM96
RefSeq (mRNA)	NM_012121	NM_001163346; NM_020006
RefSeq (protein)	NP_036253	NP_001156818; NP_064390
Location (UCSC)	Chr 17: 73.28 – 73.31 Mb	Chr 11: 113.62 – 113.64 Mb
PubMed search
- Wikidata
View/Edit Human	View/Edit Mouse

Cdc42 effector protein 4 is a protein that in humans is encoded by the CDC42EP4 gene.

The product of this gene is a member of the CDC42-binding protein family. Members of this family interact with Rho family GTPases and regulate the organization of the actin cytoskeleton. This protein has been shown to bind both CDC42 and TC10 GTPases in a GTP-dependent manner. When overexpressed in fibroblasts, this protein was able to induce pseudopodia formation, which suggested a role in inducing actin filament assembly and cell shape control.
