= TC10 =

TC10 may refer to:

- DECtape, a magnetic tape data storage medium
- TC10 protein
