= GDI1 =

Protein-coding gene in humans

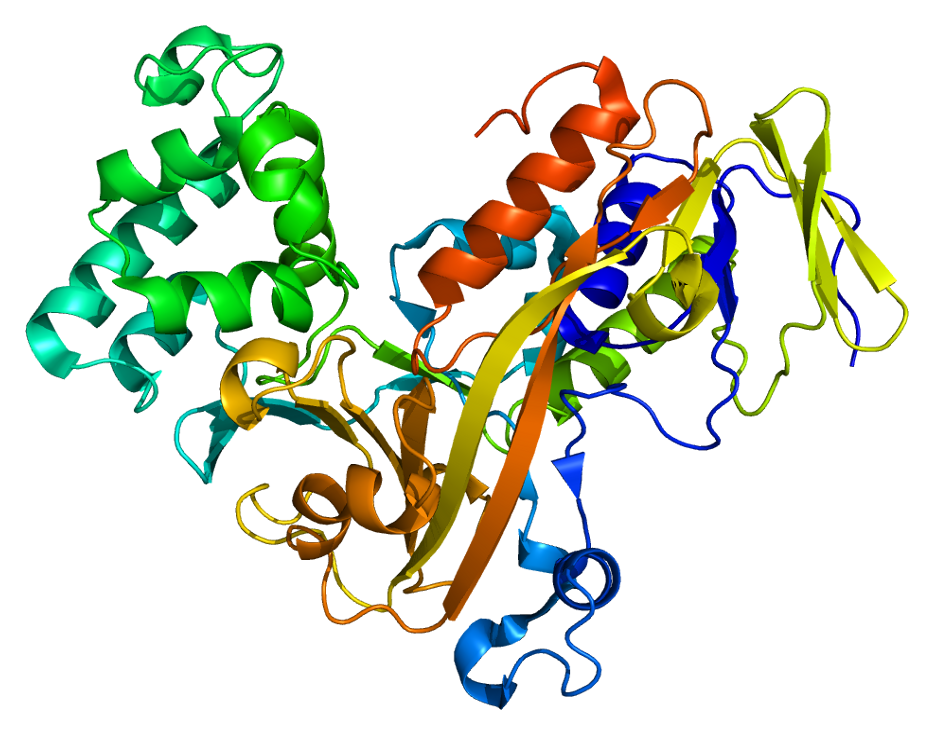

Identifiers
- Aliases: GDI1, 1A, GDIL, MRX41, MRX48, OPHN2, RABGD1A, RABGDIA, XAP-4, GDP dissociation inhibitor 1, XLID41
- External IDs: OMIM: 300104; MGI: 99846; GeneCards: GDI1

Gene location (Human)
Chr.	X chromosome (human)
Band	Xq28	Start	154,436,913 bp
Band	Xq28	End	154,443,467 bp

Gene location (Mouse)
Chr.	X chromosome (mouse)
Band	X A7.3|X 37.97 cM	Start	73,348,604 bp
Band	X A7.3|X 37.97 cM	End	73,355,468 bp
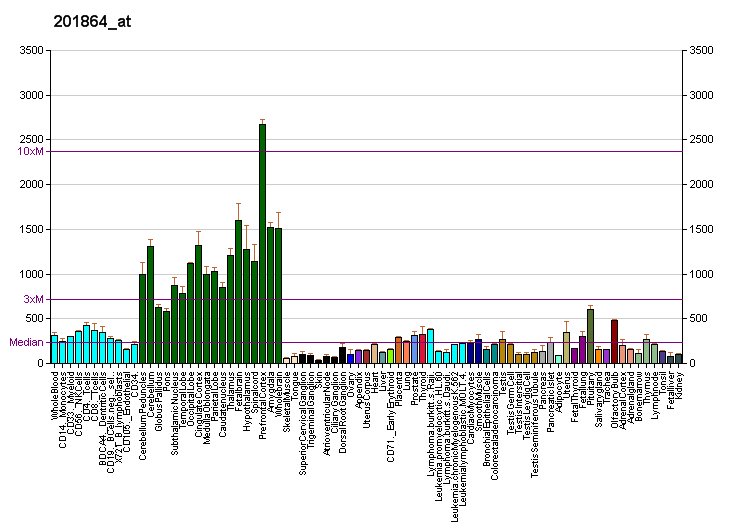
RNA expression pattern
Bgee	Human / Mouse (ortholog); Top expressed in: right hemisphere of cerebellum; right frontal lobe; prefrontal cortex; Brodmann area 9; ganglionic eminence; cingulate gyrus; anterior cingulate cortex; parietal lobe; postcentral gyrus; nucleus accumbens / Top expressed in: dentate gyrus of hippocampal formation granule cell; Region I of hippocampus proper; primary visual cortex; cerebellar cortex; medial dorsal nucleus; superior frontal gyrus; paraventricular nucleus of hypothalamus; subiculum; dorsomedial hypothalamic nucleus; ventromedial nucleus; More reference expression data
BioGPS	More reference expression data
Gene ontology
Molecular function	Rab GDP-dissociation inhibitor activity; GTPase activator activity; protein binding; GDP-dissociation inhibitor activity
Cellular component	cytoplasm; cytosol; Golgi apparatus; myelin sheath; midbody; neuron projection; axon; soma; protein-containing complex
Biological process	Rab protein signal transduction; response to calcium ion; positive regulation of GTPase activity; negative regulation of axonogenesis; negative regulation of protein targeting to membrane; protein transport; regulation of catalytic activity; regulation of small GTPase mediated signal transduction; signal transduction; small GTPase mediated signal transduction; positive regulation of axon extension; vesicle-mediated transport
Sources:Amigo / QuickGO
Orthologs
Databases	NCBI: entry; OMA: entry
Species	Human	Mouse
Entrez	2664	14567
Ensembl	ENSG00000203879	ENSMUSG00000015291
UniProt	P31150	P50396
RefSeq (mRNA)	NM_001493	NM_010273
RefSeq (protein)	NP_001484	NP_034403
Location (UCSC)	Chr X: 154.44 – 154.44 Mb	Chr X: 73.35 – 73.36 Mb
PubMed search
- Wikidata
View/Edit Human	View/Edit Mouse

Rab GDP dissociation inhibitor alpha is a protein that in humans is encoded by the GDI1 gene.

== Function ==
GDP dissociation inhibitors are proteins that regulate the GDP-GTP exchange reaction of members of the rab family, small GTP-binding proteins of the ras superfamily, that are involved in vesicular trafficking of molecules between cellular organelles. GDIs slow the rate of dissociation of GDP from rab proteins and release GDP from membrane-bound rabs. GDI1 is expressed primarily in neural and sensory tissues. Mutations in GDI1 have been linked to X-linked nonspecific intellectual disability.

Rab GTPases cycles between the cytosolic compartment, where it is bound to a protein called GDI (GDP Dissociation Inhibitor), and the membrane, where it interacts with a receptor, a nucleotide exchange factor, a GAP (GTPase Activating Protein) and probably other factors that link it to the appropriate SNARE. GDI is non-specific with respect to the rab it binds. However, the exchanger, receptor and GAP, are rab specific.

== Interactions ==
GDI1 has been shown to interact with CDC42.
