= TRIP10 =

Protein-coding gene in the species Homo sapiens

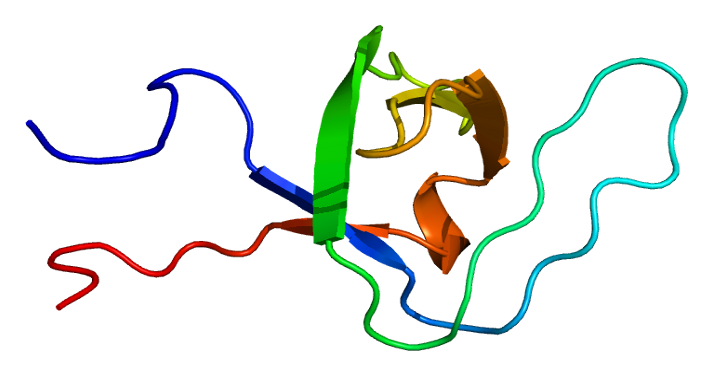

Identifiers
- Aliases: TRIP10, CIP4, HSTP, STOT, STP, TRIP-10, thyroid hormone receptor interactor 10
- External IDs: OMIM: 604504; MGI: 2146901; GeneCards: TRIP10
Available structures
PDB	Ortholog search: PDBe RCSB
PDB	List of PDB id codes 2CT4, 2EFK, 2KE4

Gene location (Human)
Chr.	Chromosome 19 (human)
Band	19p13.3	Start	6,737,925 bp
Band	19p13.3	End	6,751,530 bp

Gene location (Mouse)
Chr.	Chromosome 17 (mouse)
Band	17|17 D	Start	57,556,455 bp
Band	17|17 D	End	57,570,665 bp
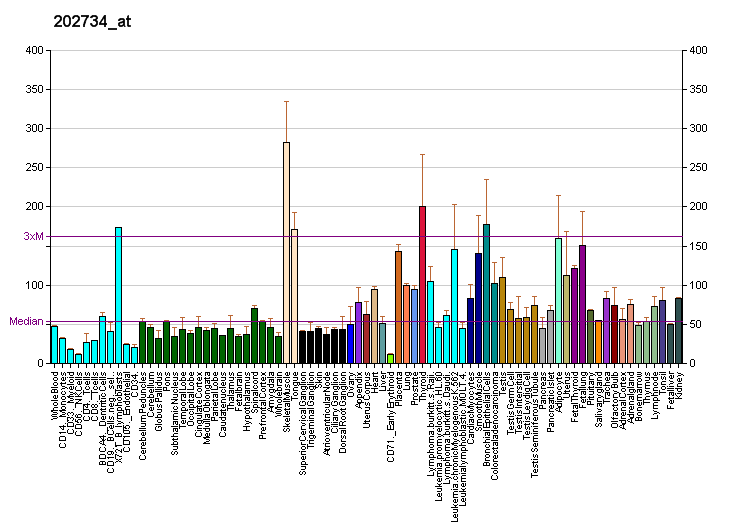
RNA expression pattern
Bgee	Human / Mouse (ortholog); Top expressed in: muscle of thigh; gastrocnemius muscle; gastric mucosa; apex of heart; ectocervix; Descending thoracic aorta; muscle layer of sigmoid colon; right coronary artery; ascending aorta; right ovary / Top expressed in: interventricular septum; muscle of thigh; skeletal muscle tissue; triceps brachii muscle; lip; temporal muscle; ankle; sternocleidomastoid muscle; extraocular muscle; digastric muscle; More reference expression data
BioGPS	More reference expression data
Gene ontology
Molecular function	protein binding; identical protein binding; lipid binding; GTPase activator activity
Cellular component	cytoplasm; cytosol; Golgi apparatus; cell projection; intracellular membrane-bounded organelle; membrane; plasma membrane; nucleoplasm; cell cortex; perinuclear region of cytoplasm; lysosome; phagocytic cup; cytoskeleton; extracellular exosome
Biological process	endocytosis; cell communication; regulation of small GTPase mediated signal transduction; signal transduction; positive regulation of GTPase activity; actin cytoskeleton organization; membrane organization
Sources:Amigo / QuickGO
Orthologs
Databases	NCBI: entry; OMA: entry
Species	Human	Mouse
Entrez	9322	106628
Ensembl	ENSG00000125733	ENSMUSG00000019487
UniProt	Q15642	Q8CJ53
RefSeq (mRNA)	NM_001288962; NM_001288963; NM_004240	NM_001242389; NM_001242390; NM_001242391; NM_134125
RefSeq (protein)	NP_001275891; NP_001275892; NP_004231	NP_001229318; NP_001229319; NP_001229320; NP_598886
Location (UCSC)	Chr 19: 6.74 – 6.75 Mb	Chr 17: 57.56 – 57.57 Mb
PubMed search
- Wikidata
View/Edit Human	View/Edit Mouse

Cdc42-interacting protein 4 is a protein that in humans is encoded by the TRIP10 gene.

== Interactions ==
TRIP10 has been shown to interact with STAT3, Wiskott-Aldrich syndrome protein, Huntingtin, CDC42, AKAP9 and RHOQ.
