= BNIP2 =

Protein-coding gene in the species Homo sapiens

Identifiers
- Aliases: BNIP2, BNIP-2, NIP2, BCL2/adenovirus E1B 19kDa interacting protein 2, BCL2 interacting protein 2
- External IDs: OMIM: 603292; MGI: 109327; GeneCards: BNIP2

Gene location (Human)
Chr.	Chromosome 15 (human)
Band	15q22.2	Start	59,659,146 bp
Band	15q22.2	End	59,689,534 bp

Gene location (Mouse)
Chr.	Chromosome 9 (mouse)
Band	9|9 D	Start	69,896,748 bp
Band	9|9 D	End	69,915,599 bp
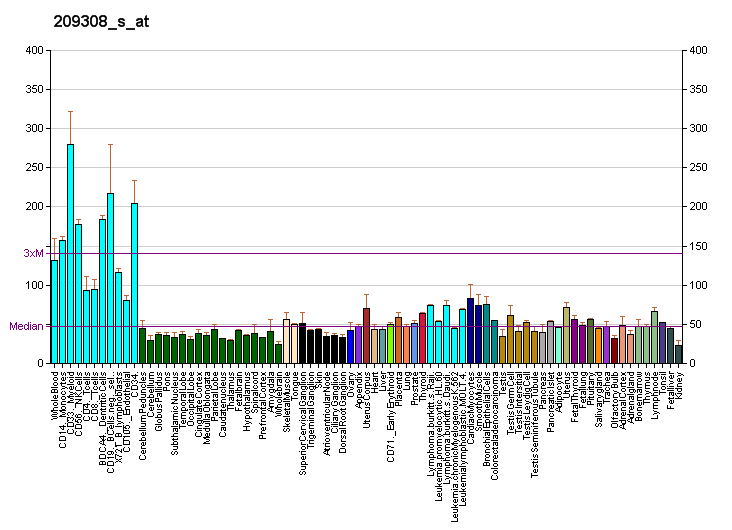
RNA expression pattern
Bgee	Human / Mouse (ortholog); Top expressed in: Achilles tendon; monocyte; epithelium of colon; bone marrow cell; rectum; body of pancreas; minor salivary glands; right uterine tube; right lung; gallbladder / Top expressed in: ascending aorta; aortic valve; tunica media of zone of aorta; genital tubercle; tail of embryo; iris; ciliary body; stroma of bone marrow; fossa; body of femur; More reference expression data
BioGPS	More reference expression data
Gene ontology
Molecular function	GTPase activator activity; calcium ion binding; identical protein binding; protein binding; exopolyphosphatase activity
Cellular component	perinuclear region of cytoplasm; cytoplasm; intracellular membrane-bounded organelle; nuclear envelope; cytosol; membrane; integral component of membrane
Biological process	positive regulation of muscle cell differentiation; negative regulation of apoptotic process; apoptotic process; positive regulation of GTPase activity; polyphosphate catabolic process
Sources:Amigo / QuickGO
Orthologs
Databases	NCBI: entry; OMA: entry
Species	Human	Mouse
Entrez	663	12175
Ensembl	ENSG00000140299	ENSMUSG00000011958
UniProt	Q12982	O54940
RefSeq (mRNA)	NM_004330; NM_001320674; NM_001320675	NM_001008238; NM_016787; NM_001374750
RefSeq (protein)	NP_001307603; NP_001307604; NP_004321; NP_001354986; NP_001354987 NP_001354988; NP_001354989; NP_001354990	NP_001008239; NP_058067; NP_001361679
Location (UCSC)	Chr 15: 59.66 – 59.69 Mb	Chr 9: 69.9 – 69.92 Mb
PubMed search
- Wikidata
View/Edit Human	View/Edit Mouse

BCL2/adenovirus E1B 19 kDa protein-interacting protein 2 is a protein that in humans is encoded by the BNIP2 gene.

== Function ==
This gene is a member of the BCL2/adenovirus E1B 19 kd-interacting protein (BNIP) family. Though the specific function is unknown, it interacts with the E1B 19 kDa protein which is responsible for the protection of virally induced cell death, as well as E1B 19 kDa-like sequences of BCL-2, also an apoptotic protector.

== Interactions ==
BNIP2 has been shown to interact with:

- ARHGAP1,
- Bcl-2, and
- CDC42.
