= PARD6B =

Protein-coding gene in the species Homo sapiens

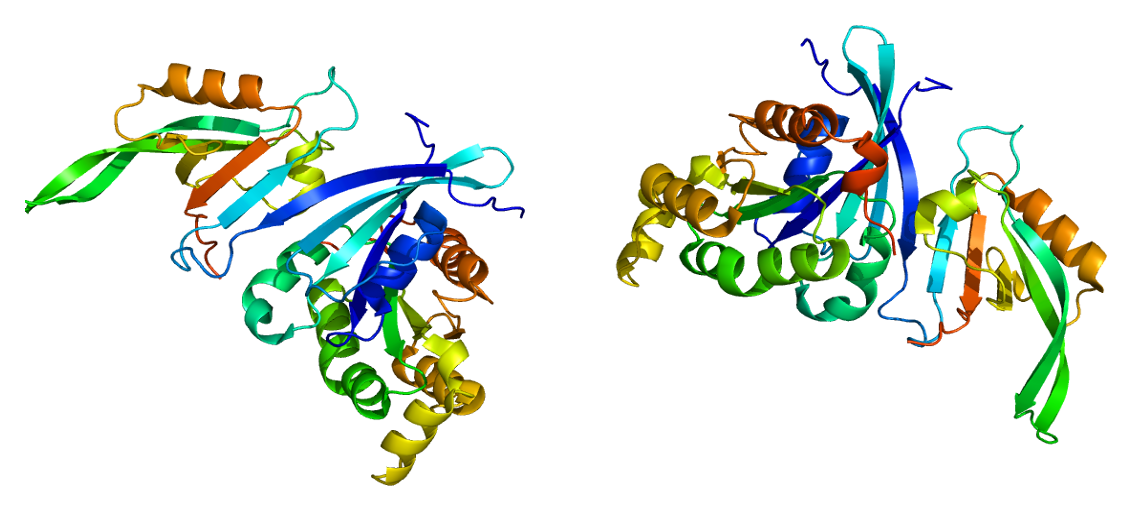

Identifiers
- Aliases: PARD6B, PAR6B, par-6 family cell polarity regulator beta
- External IDs: OMIM: 608975; MGI: 2135605; GeneCards: PARD6B
Available structures
PDB	Ortholog search: PDBe RCSB
PDB	List of PDB id codes 1NF3

Gene location (Human)
Chr.	Chromosome 20 (human)
Band	20q13.13	Start	50,731,580 bp
Band	20q13.13	End	50,756,795 bp

Gene location (Mouse)
Chr.	Chromosome 2 (mouse)
Band	2|2 H3	Start	167,922,924 bp
Band	2|2 H3	End	167,943,123 bp
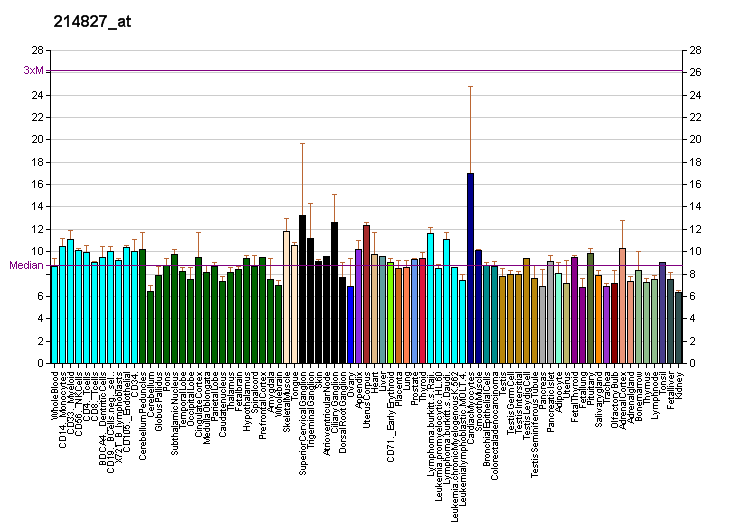

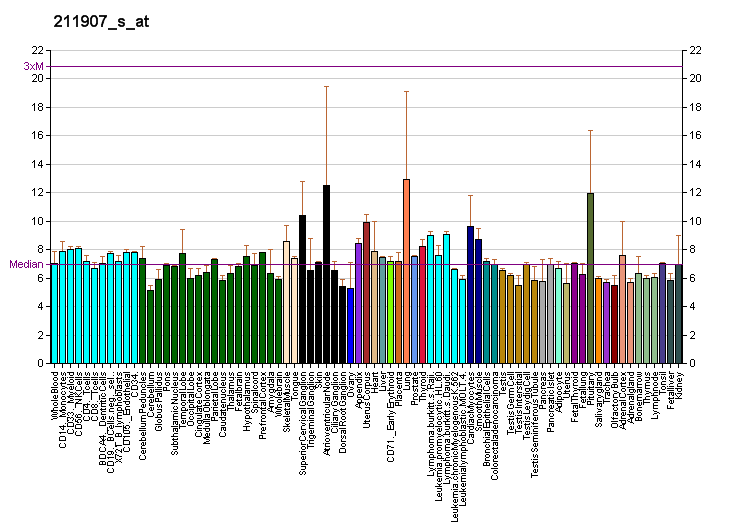
RNA expression pattern
Bgee	Human / Mouse (ortholog); Top expressed in: germinal epithelium; renal medulla; retinal pigment epithelium; palpebral conjunctiva; epithelium of nasopharynx; amniotic fluid; jejunal mucosa; lower lobe of lung; mucosa of paranasal sinus; bronchial epithelial cell / Top expressed in: secondary oocyte; zygote; primary oocyte; left lung lobe; renal corpuscle; medullary collecting duct; right kidney; right lung lobe; yolk sac; epiblast; More reference expression data
BioGPS	More reference expression data
Gene ontology
Molecular function	protein binding; protein kinase C binding
Cellular component	membrane; bicellular tight junction; plasma membrane; apical part of cell; cell junction; cell cortex; extracellular exosome; nucleus; cytoplasm; cytosol; apical plasma membrane; protein-containing complex
Biological process	regulation of cell migration; axonogenesis; cell division; bicellular tight junction assembly; cell cycle; cell-cell junction assembly; establishment or maintenance of cell polarity; centrosome cycle; regulation of cellular localization; protein-containing complex assembly
Sources:Amigo / QuickGO
Orthologs
Databases	NCBI: entry; OMA: entry
Species	Human	Mouse
Entrez	84612	58220
Ensembl	ENSG00000124171	ENSMUSG00000044641
UniProt	Q9BYG5	Q9JK83
RefSeq (mRNA)	NM_032521	NM_021409
RefSeq (protein)	NP_115910	NP_067384
Location (UCSC)	Chr 20: 50.73 – 50.76 Mb	Chr 2: 167.92 – 167.94 Mb
PubMed search
- Wikidata
View/Edit Human	View/Edit Mouse

Partitioning defective 6 homolog beta is a protein that in humans is encoded by the PARD6B gene.

== Function ==
This gene is a member of the PAR6 family and encodes a protein with a PSD95/Discs-large/ZO1 (PDZ) domain, an OPR domain and a semi-Cdc42/Rac interactive binding (CRIB) domain. This cytoplasmic protein is involved in asymmetrical cell division and cell polarization processes as a member of a multi-protein complex.

== Interactions ==
PARD6B has been shown to interact with:

- CDC42,
- Protein kinase Mζ,
- RAC1, and
- RHOQ.
