= NIF3L1 =

Protein-coding gene in the species Homo sapiens

Identifiers
- Aliases: NIF3L1, ALS2CR1, CALS-7, MDS015, NGG1 interacting factor 3 like 1
- External IDs: OMIM: 605778; MGI: 1929485; HomoloGene: 5881; GeneCards: NIF3L1; OMA:NIF3L1 - orthologs

Gene location (Human)
Chr.	Chromosome 2 (human)
Band	2q33.1	Start	200,889,327 bp
Band	2q33.1	End	200,903,938 bp

Gene location (Mouse)
Chr.	Chromosome 1 (mouse)
Band	1|1 C1.3	Start	58,484,310 bp
Band	1|1 C1.3	End	58,520,975 bp
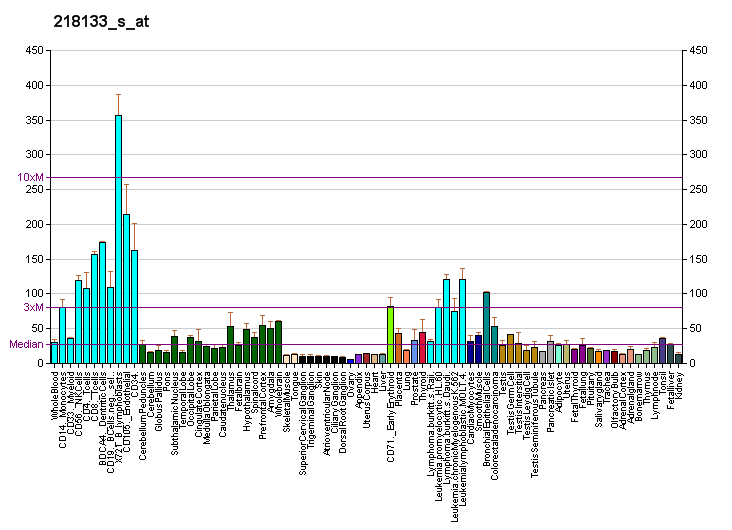
RNA expression pattern
Bgee	Human / Mouse (ortholog); Top expressed in: secondary oocyte; gonad; rectum; islet of Langerhans; Achilles tendon; testicle; Skeletal muscle tissue of biceps brachii; palpebral conjunctiva; middle temporal gyrus; Skeletal muscle tissue of rectus abdominis / Top expressed in: otic vesicle; otic placode; epiblast; lens; primitive streak; embryo; facial motor nucleus; saccule; ventricular zone; medial ganglionic eminence; More reference expression data
BioGPS	More reference expression data
Gene ontology
Molecular function	transcription factor binding; protein binding; identical protein binding
Cellular component	cytoplasm; nucleus; mitochondrion
Biological process	positive regulation of transcription, DNA-templated; negative regulation of nucleic acid-templated transcription; neuron differentiation
Sources:Amigo / QuickGO
Orthologs
Species	Human	Mouse
Entrez	60491	65102
Ensembl	ENSG00000196290	ENSMUSG00000026036
UniProt	Q9GZT8	Q9EQ80
RefSeq (mRNA)	NM_001136039; NM_001142355; NM_001142356; NM_021824; NM_001369441 NM_001369442; NM_001369443; NM_001369444; NM_001369445	NM_022988
RefSeq (protein)	NP_001129511; NP_001135827; NP_001135828; NP_068596; NP_001356370 NP_001356371; NP_001356372; NP_001356373; NP_001356374	NP_075364
Location (UCSC)	Chr 2: 200.89 – 200.9 Mb	Chr 1: 58.48 – 58.52 Mb
PubMed search
- Wikidata
View/Edit Human	View/Edit Mouse

NIF3-like protein 1 is a protein that in humans is encoded by the NIF3L1 gene.

== Interactions ==
NIF3L1 has been shown to interact with COPS2.
