= GFER =

Protein-coding gene in the species Homo sapiens

Available structures
PDB	Ortholog search: PDBe RCSB
PDB	List of PDB id codes 3MBG, 3O55, 3TK0, 3U2L, 3U2M, 3U5S, 4LDK

Identifiers
- Aliases: GFER, ALR, ERV1, HERV1, HPO, HPO1, HPO2, HSS, growth factor, augmenter of liver regeneration, MMCHD, MPMCD
- External IDs: OMIM: 600924; MGI: 107757; HomoloGene: 55884; GeneCards: GFER; OMA:GFER - orthologs

Gene location (Human)
Chr.	Chromosome 16 (human)
Band	16p13.3	Start	1,984,193 bp
Band	16p13.3	End	1,987,749 bp

Gene location (Mouse)
Chr.	Chromosome 17 (mouse)
Band	17 A3.3|17 12.48 cM	Start	24,912,161 bp
Band	17 A3.3|17 12.48 cM	End	24,915,130 bp
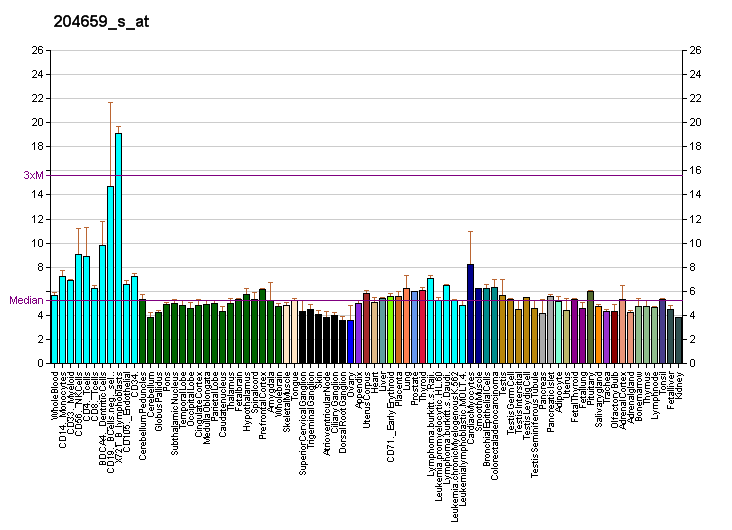

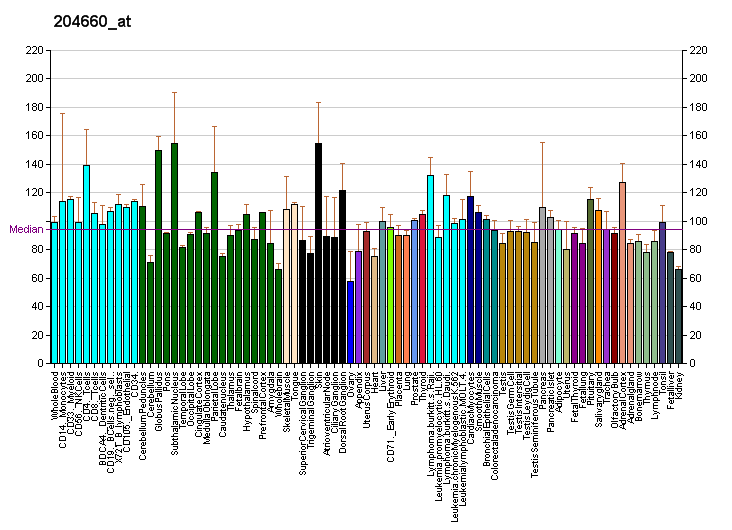
RNA expression pattern
Bgee	Human / Mouse (ortholog); Top expressed in: vena cava; mucosa of transverse colon; body of pancreas; muscle of thigh; olfactory zone of nasal mucosa; granulocyte; body of tongue; right lobe of liver; right testis; gastrocnemius muscle / Top expressed in: seminiferous tubule; primary oocyte; Ileal epithelium; left lobe of liver; Paneth cell; triceps brachii muscle; embryo; proximal tubule; epiblast; right kidney; More reference expression data
BioGPS	More reference expression data
Gene ontology
Molecular function	protein-disulfide reductase activity; oxidoreductase activity; growth factor activity; protein binding; thiol oxidase activity; flavin adenine dinucleotide binding; flavin-linked sulfhydryl oxidase activity
Cellular component	extracellular region; mitochondrial intermembrane space; cytoplasm; mitochondrion; cytosol
Biological process	liver development; regulation of signaling receptor activity; signal transduction
Sources:Amigo / QuickGO
Orthologs
Species	Human	Mouse
Entrez	2671	11692
Ensembl	ENSG00000127554	ENSMUSG00000040888
UniProt	P55789	P56213
RefSeq (mRNA)	NM_005262	NM_023040; NM_212443; NM_001379038; NM_001379039
RefSeq (protein)	NP_005253	NP_075527
Location (UCSC)	Chr 16: 1.98 – 1.99 Mb	Chr 17: 24.91 – 24.92 Mb
PubMed search
- Wikidata
View/Edit Human	View/Edit Mouse

Growth factor, augmenter of liver regeneration (ERV1 homolog, S. cerevisiae), also known as GFER, or Hepatopoietin is a protein which in humans is encoded by the GFER gene. This gene is also known as essential for respiration and vegatative growth, augmenter of liver regeneration, and growth factor of Erv1-like/Hepatic regenerative stimulation substance.

== Structure ==
The GFER gene is located on the p arm of chromosome 16 at position 13.3 and it spans 3,600 base pairs. The GFER gene produces a 15.4 kDa protein composed of 130 amino acids. The structure of the protein is a homodimer which has been found to be fairly similar to the scERV1 protein of yeast.

== Genomics ==
The gene resides on chromosome 16 in the interval containing the locus for polycystic kidney disease (PKD1). The putative gene product is 42% similar to the scERV1 protein of yeast.

== Function ==
The hepatotrophic factor designated augmenter of liver regeneration (ALR) is thought to be one of the factors responsible for the extraordinary regenerative capacity of mammalian liver. It has also been called hepatic regenerative stimulation substance (HSS). The yeast scERV1 gene had been found to be essential for oxidative phosphorylation, the maintenance of mitochondrial genomes, and the cell division cycle. The human gene is both the structural and functional homolog of the yeast scERV1 gene.

== Clinical significance ==
Mutations in GFER has been shown to result in Myopathy, mitochondrial progressive, with congenital cataract, hearing loss and developmental delay (MPMCHD). MPMCHD is a disease characterized by progressive myopathy and partial combined respiratory-chain deficiency, congenital cataract, sensorineural hearing loss, and developmental delay.

== Interactions ==
GFER has been shown to interact with COP9 constitutive photomorphogenic homolog subunit 5 and BNIPL.
