= BNIPL =

Protein-coding gene in humans

Identifiers
- Aliases: BNIPL, BNIP-S, BNIPL-1, BNIPL-2, BNIPL1, BNIPL2, BNIPS, PP753, BCL2/adenovirus E1B 19kD interacting protein like, BNIP-Salpha, BNIP-Sbeta, BCL2 interacting protein like
- External IDs: OMIM: 611275; MGI: 2384749; GeneCards: BNIPL

Gene location (Human)
Chr.	Chromosome 1 (human)
Band	1q21.3	Start	151,036,321 bp
Band	1q21.3	End	151,047,720 bp

Gene location (Mouse)
Chr.	Chromosome 3 (mouse)
Band	3|3 F2.1	Start	95,148,582 bp
Band	3|3 F2.1	End	95,158,504 bp
RNA expression pattern
Bgee	Human / Mouse (ortholog); Top expressed in: skin of arm; skin of abdomen; amniotic fluid; skin of leg; skin of thigh; skin of hip; gingival epithelium; oral cavity; mucosa of pharynx; buccal mucosa cell / Top expressed in: lip; esophagus; zone of skin; urinary bladder; urethra; female urethra; morula; male urethra; epithelium of urethra; epithelium of male urethra; More reference expression data
BioGPS	n/a
Gene ontology
Molecular function	protein binding; identical protein binding; exopolyphosphatase activity
Cellular component	cytosol; nucleus; cytoplasm
Biological process	regulation of growth rate; negative regulation of cell population proliferation; apoptotic process; polyphosphate catabolic process
Sources:Amigo / QuickGO
Orthologs
Databases	NCBI: entry; OMA: entry
Species	Human	Mouse
Entrez	149428	171388
Ensembl	ENSG00000163141	ENSMUSG00000028115
UniProt	Q7Z465	Q99JU7
RefSeq (mRNA)	NM_001159642; NM_138278; NM_138279	NM_001168356; NM_134253
RefSeq (protein)	NP_001153114; NP_612122	NP_001161828; NP_599014
Location (UCSC)	Chr 1: 151.04 – 151.05 Mb	Chr 3: 95.15 – 95.16 Mb
PubMed search
- Wikidata
View/Edit Human	View/Edit Mouse

Bcl-2/adenovirus E1B 19 kDa-interacting protein 2-like protein is a protein that in humans is encoded by the BNIPL gene.

== Interactions ==
BNIPL has been shown to interact with:

- BCL2-like 1,
- Bcl-2,
- CDC42,
- GFER, and
- Macrophage migration inhibitory factor.
