= CDC42EP2 =

Protein-coding gene in humans

Identifiers
- Aliases: CDC42EP2, BORG1, CEP2, CDC42 effector protein 2
- External IDs: OMIM: 606132; MGI: 1929744; GeneCards: CDC42EP2

Gene location (Human)
Chr.	Chromosome 11 (human)
Band	11q13.1	Start	65,314,866 bp
Band	11q13.1	End	65,322,417 bp

Gene location (Mouse)
Chr.	Chromosome 19 (mouse)
Band	19 A|19 4.34 cM	Start	5,965,664 bp
Band	19 A|19 4.34 cM	End	5,974,844 bp
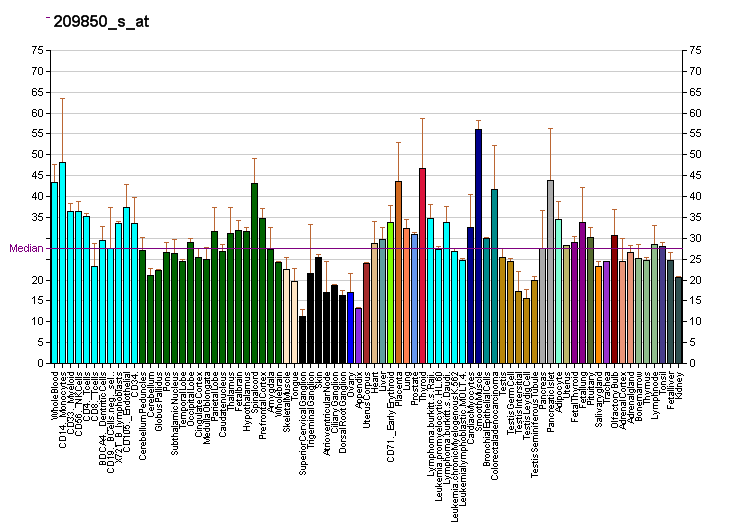

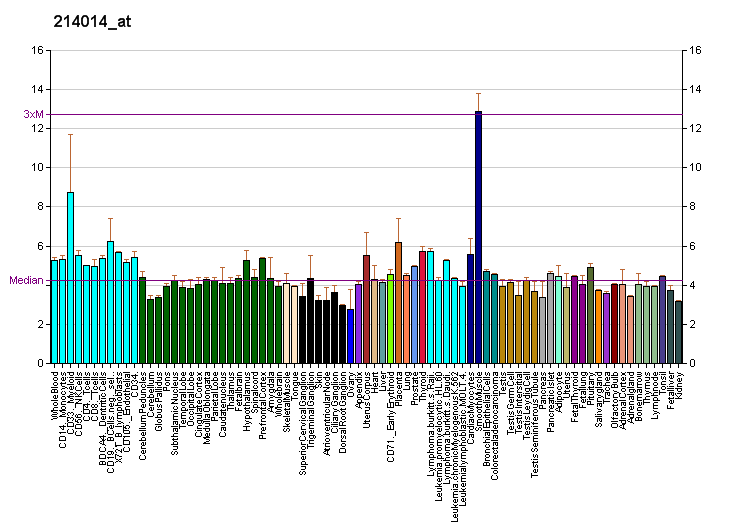
RNA expression pattern
Bgee	Human / Mouse (ortholog); Top expressed in: apex of heart; gastric mucosa; blood; C1 segment; stromal cell of endometrium; subcutaneous adipose tissue; left uterine tube; gallbladder; upper lobe of left lung; left ventricle / Top expressed in: ankle; dermis; soleus muscle; secondary oocyte; granulocyte; sternocleidomastoid muscle; interventricular septum; temporal muscle; knee joint; primary oocyte; More reference expression data
BioGPS	More reference expression data
Gene ontology
Molecular function	protein binding; GTPase activator activity; opioid peptide activity
Cellular component	cytoplasm; microtubule cytoskeleton; plasma membrane; membrane; endomembrane system; cytoskeleton; cytosol; phagocytic vesicle
Biological process	positive regulation of pseudopodium assembly; positive regulation of actin filament polymerization; positive regulation of protein-containing complex assembly; actin cytoskeleton organization; Rho protein signal transduction; actin filament organization; regulation of cell shape; positive regulation of GTPase activity; regulation of signaling receptor activity; cellular response to interferon-gamma
Sources:Amigo / QuickGO
Orthologs
Databases	NCBI: entry; OMA: entry
Species	Human	Mouse
Entrez	10435	104252
Ensembl	ENSG00000149798	ENSMUSG00000045664
UniProt	O14613	Q8JZX9
RefSeq (mRNA)	NM_006779	NM_026772
RefSeq (protein)	NP_006770	NP_081048
Location (UCSC)	Chr 11: 65.31 – 65.32 Mb	Chr 19: 5.97 – 5.97 Mb
PubMed search
- Wikidata
View/Edit Human	View/Edit Mouse

Cdc42 effector protein 2 is a protein that in humans is encoded by the CDC42EP2 gene.

== Function ==
CDC42, a small Rho GTPase, regulates the formation of F-actin-containing structures through its interaction with the downstream effector proteins. The protein encoded by this gene is a member of the Borg family of CDC42 effector proteins. Borg family proteins contain a CRIB (Cdc42/Rac interactive-binding) domain. They bind to, and negatively regulate the function of, CDC42. Coexpression of this protein with dominant negative mutant CDC42 protein in fibroblast was found to induce pseudopodia formation, which suggested a role of this protein in actin filament assembly and cell shape control.

== Interactions ==
CDC42EP2 has been shown to interact with CDC42 and RHOQ.
