= ROP GTPase =

Plant Protein

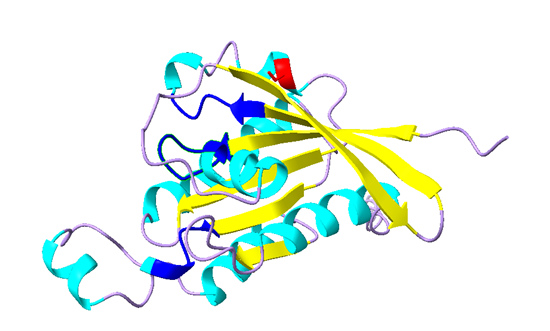
ROP Protein Structure: Dark Blue / possible binding sites at amino acid locations 13-20, 60-64, and 118-121; Yellow / beta sheets; Cyan / alpha helices; Red / potential phosphorylation site for protein activity regulation; serine residue at amino acid 74; PBD / AF-P92978-F1; UniProt

Rho-related GTPases from plants, otherwise known as ROPs, are involved in cell polarity through the regulation of cytoskeleton components like actin and microtubules. Unlike mammalian cells, plant cells do not contain heterotrimeric G proteins like Cdc42, Rac, and Rho that are known to regulate cellular polarity.

== Structure and Function ==
ROP proteins are a type of monomeric G proteins found in plants belonging to the Rho family. ROP binding to GTP or GDP determines its activity due to conformational changes within its structure. Within the G-domain of the structure are the G-box motifs G1-5. These motifs are formed during protein folding and are composed of conserved sequences that are responsible for nucleotide and magnesium binding as well as hydrolysis of GTP. Motifs G2 (switch I loop) and G3 (switch II loop) possess distinct conformations depending on GTP binding state. In addition, the G-domain contains a unique and conserved helical domain commonly found in Rho family proteins called αi.

Specific locations within the 3D ROP protein structure, including the amino acids 13-20, 60-64, and 118-121, act as binding sites during protein activity. The serine residue at amino acid 74 has been shown to be a potential protein activity regulation site through phosphorylation.
