= ARHGAP1 =

Protein-coding gene in humans

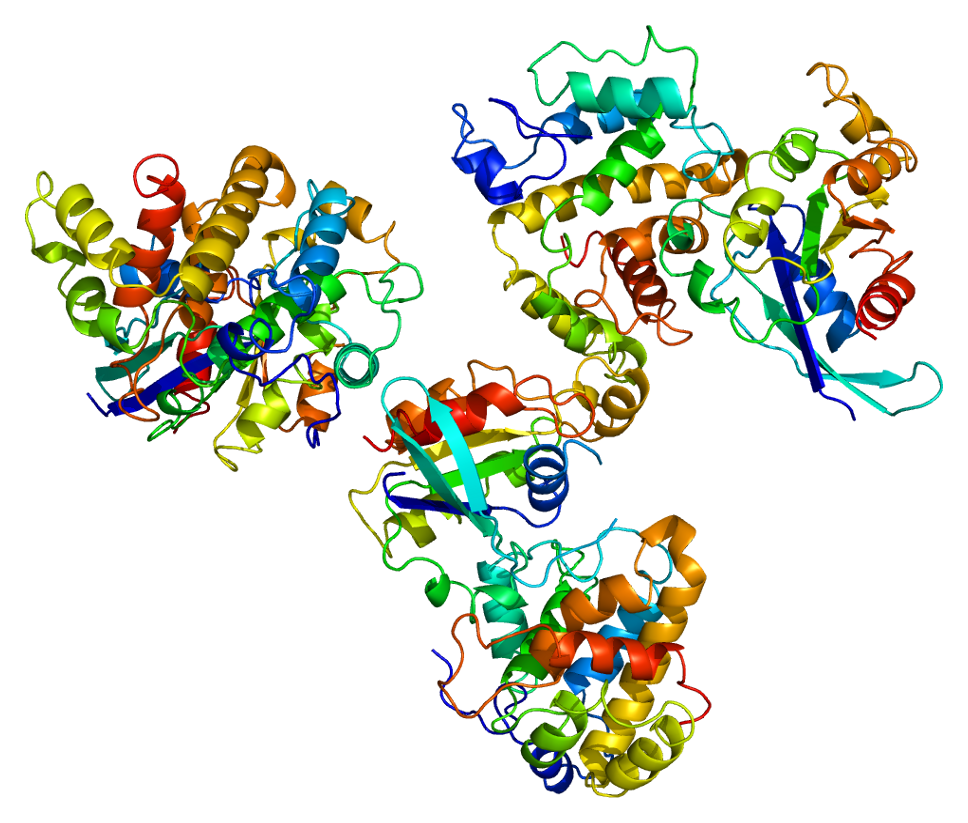

Identifiers
- Aliases: ARHGAP1, CDC42GAP, RHOGAP, RHOGAP1, p50rhoGAP, Rho GTPase activating protein 1
- External IDs: OMIM: 602732; MGI: 2445003; GeneCards: ARHGAP1
Available structures
PDB	Ortholog search: PDBe RCSB
PDB	List of PDB id codes 1AM4, 1GRN, 1OW3, 1RGP, 1TX4, 2NGR

Gene location (Human)
Chr.	Chromosome 11 (human)
Band	11p11.2	Start	46,677,080 bp
Band	11p11.2	End	46,700,619 bp

Gene location (Mouse)
Chr.	Chromosome 2 (mouse)
Band	2|2 E1	Start	91,480,205 bp
Band	2|2 E1	End	91,502,671 bp
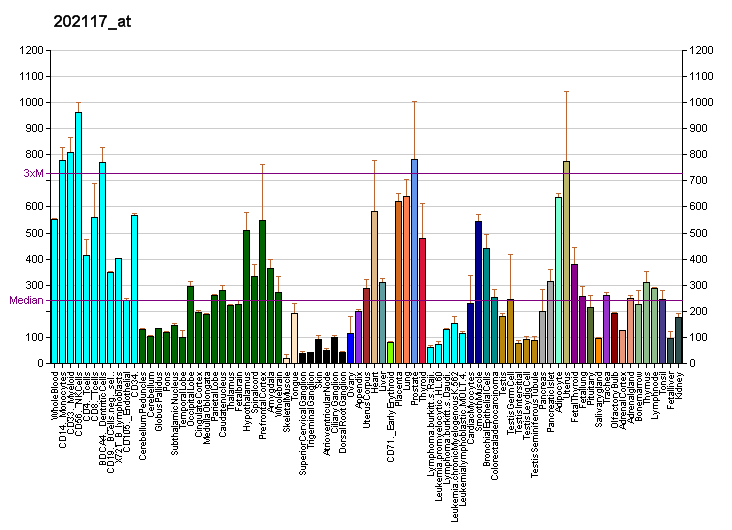

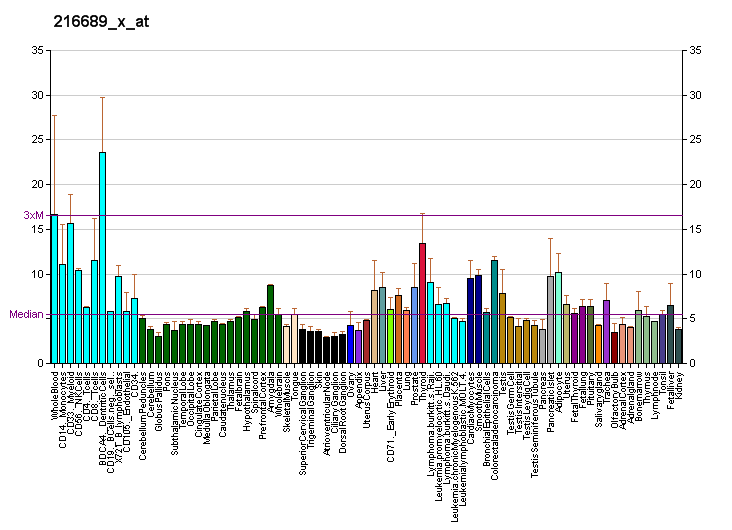
RNA expression pattern
Bgee	Human / Mouse (ortholog); Top expressed in: gingival epithelium; saphenous vein; epithelium of esophagus; parietal pleura; visceral pleura; amniotic fluid; urethra; decidua; tail of epididymis; vena cava / Top expressed in: yolk sac; granulocyte; corneal stroma; lip; genital tubercle; tail of embryo; morula; morula; blastocyst; dentate gyrus of hippocampal formation granule cell; More reference expression data
BioGPS	More reference expression data
Gene ontology
Molecular function	SH3 domain binding; protein binding; GTPase activator activity; cadherin binding
Cellular component	cytosol; extracellular exosome; cytoplasm; endosome membrane; perinuclear region of cytoplasm; sorting endosome; membrane; integral component of membrane
Biological process	regulation of small GTPase mediated signal transduction; Rho protein signal transduction; signal transduction; positive regulation of GTPase activity; small GTPase mediated signal transduction; positive regulation of signal transduction; transferrin transport; iron ion import across cell outer membrane; negative regulation of endocytic recycling; endosomal transport
Sources:Amigo / QuickGO
Orthologs
Databases	NCBI: entry; OMA: entry
Species	Human	Mouse
Entrez	392	228359
Ensembl	ENSG00000175220	ENSMUSG00000027247
UniProt	Q07960	Q5FWK3
RefSeq (mRNA)	NM_004308	NM_001145902; NM_146124; NM_001359970
RefSeq (protein)	NP_004299	NP_001139374; NP_666236; NP_001346899
Location (UCSC)	Chr 11: 46.68 – 46.7 Mb	Chr 2: 91.48 – 91.5 Mb
PubMed search
- Wikidata
View/Edit Human	View/Edit Mouse

Rho GTPase-activating protein 1 is an enzyme that in humans is encoded by the ARHGAP1 gene.

== Interactions ==
ARHGAP1 has been shown to interact with:

- BNIP2
- CDC42, and
- RHOA.
