= CDC42EP3 =

Protein-coding gene in humans

Identifiers
- Aliases: CDC42EP3, BORG2, CEP3, UB1, CDC42 effector protein 3
- External IDs: OMIM: 606133; MGI: 2384718; GeneCards: CDC42EP3

Gene location (Human)
Chr.	Chromosome 2 (human)
Band	2p22.2	Start	37,641,882 bp
Band	2p22.2	End	37,738,468 bp

Gene location (Mouse)
Chr.	Chromosome 17 (mouse)
Band	17|17 E3	Start	79,641,156 bp
Band	17|17 E3	End	79,662,520 bp
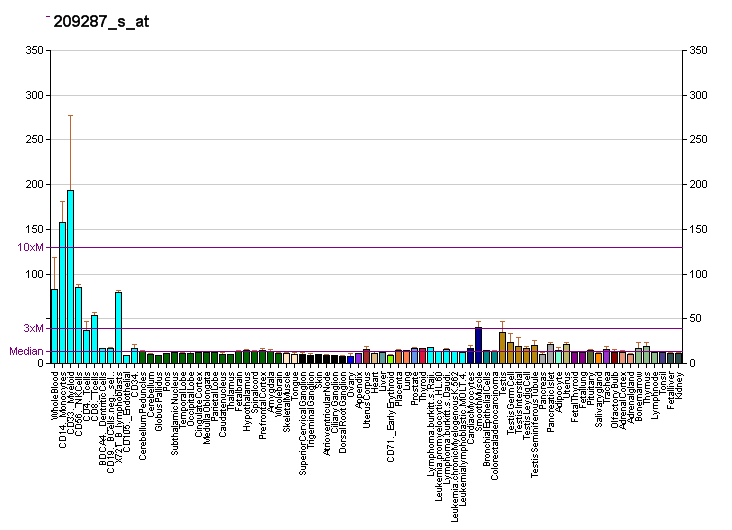

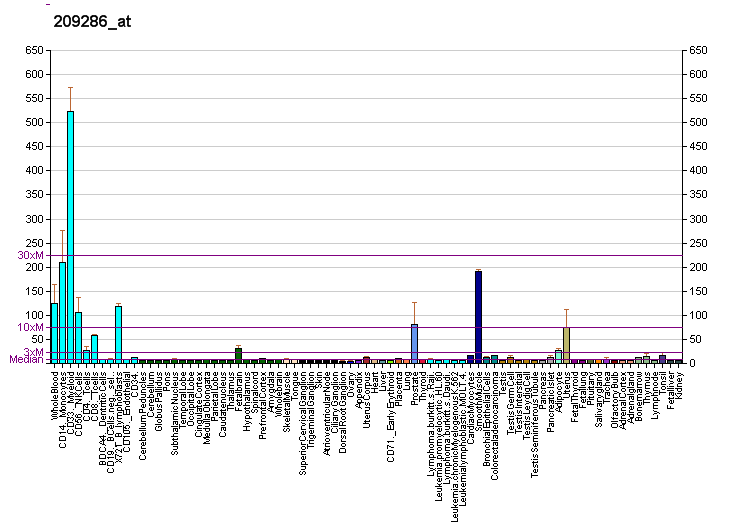

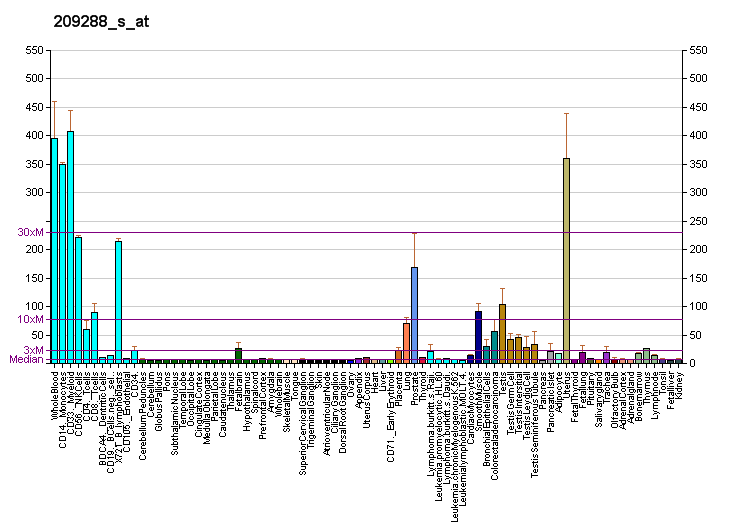
RNA expression pattern
Bgee	Human / Mouse (ortholog); Top expressed in: tibia; monocyte; seminal vesicula; myocardium of left ventricle; glomerulus; metanephric glomerulus; saphenous vein; right ventricle; tail of epididymis; myometrium / Top expressed in: spermatocyte; condyle; tibiofemoral joint; tunica media of zone of aorta; granulocyte; vas deferens; urinary bladder; seminiferous tubule; calvaria; ascending aorta; More reference expression data
BioGPS	More reference expression data
Gene ontology
Molecular function	GTPase activator activity; cytoskeletal regulatory protein binding; protein binding
Cellular component	cytoplasm; cytosol; cytoskeleton; membrane; endomembrane system; actin cytoskeleton; plasma membrane
Biological process	positive regulation of pseudopodium assembly; positive regulation of actin filament polymerization; Rho protein signal transduction; signal transduction; regulation of cell shape; positive regulation of GTPase activity
Sources:Amigo / QuickGO
Orthologs
Databases	NCBI: entry; OMA: entry
Species	Human	Mouse
Entrez	10602	260409
Ensembl	ENSG00000163171	ENSMUSG00000036533
UniProt	Q9UKI2	Q9CQC5
RefSeq (mRNA)	NM_001270436; NM_001270437; NM_001270438; NM_006449; NM_001371569 NM_001371570	NM_026514
RefSeq (protein)	NP_001257365; NP_001257366; NP_001257367; NP_006440; NP_001358498 NP_001358499	NP_080790
Location (UCSC)	Chr 2: 37.64 – 37.74 Mb	Chr 17: 79.64 – 79.66 Mb
PubMed search
- Wikidata
View/Edit Human	View/Edit Mouse

Cdc42 effector protein 3 is a protein that in humans is encoded by the CDC42EP3 gene.

CDC42, a small Rho GTPase, regulates the formation of F-actin-containing structures through its interaction with the downstream effector proteins. The protein encoded by this gene is a member of the Borg family of CDC42 effector proteins. Borg family proteins contain a CRIB (Cdc42/Rac interactive-binding) domain. They bind to, and negatively regulate the function of, CDC42. This protein can interact with CDC42, as well as with the ras homolog gene family, member Q (ARHQ/TC10). Expression of this protein in fibroblasts has been shown to induce pseudopodia formation.

== Interactions ==
CDC42EP3 has been shown to interact with CDC42 and RHOQ.
