= CSN2 =

Protein-coding gene in humans

Identifiers
- Aliases: CSN2, CASB, casein beta, PDC213
- External IDs: OMIM: 115460; MGI: 88541; GeneCards: CSN2

Gene location (Human)
Chr.	Chromosome 4 (human)
Band	4q13.3	Start	69,955,256 bp
Band	4q13.3	End	69,965,728 bp

Gene location (Mouse)
Chr.	Chromosome 5 (mouse)
Band	5 E1|5 43.56 cM	Start	87,840,483 bp
Band	5 E1|5 43.56 cM	End	87,847,489 bp
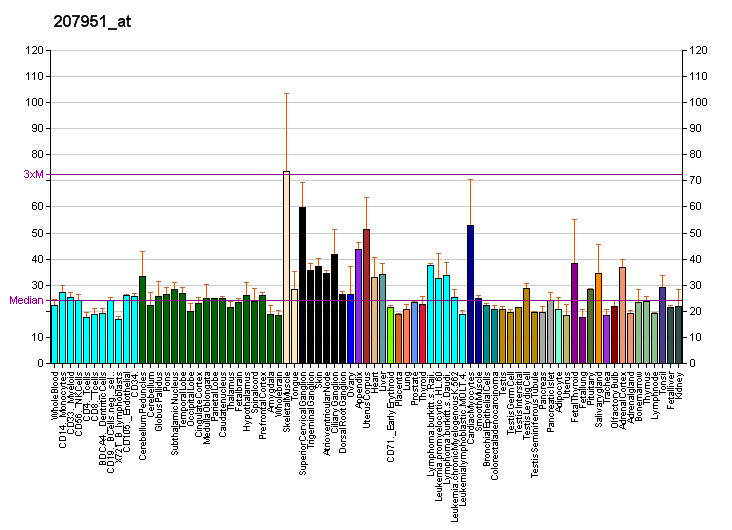
RNA expression pattern
Bgee	Human / Mouse (ortholog); Top expressed in: testicle; tonsil; salivary gland; minor salivary glands; olfactory zone of nasal mucosa; islet of Langerhans; smooth muscle tissue; placenta; urinary bladder; skeletal muscle / Top expressed in: lactiferous gland; parotid gland; muscle of thigh; thymus; mesenteric lymph nodes; umbilical cord; tibiofemoral joint; dorsal striatum; choroid plexus of fourth ventricle; sexually immature organism; More reference expression data
BioGPS	More reference expression data
Gene ontology
Molecular function	calcium ion binding; enzyme inhibitor activity; transporter activity; cysteine-type endopeptidase inhibitor activity
Cellular component	extracellular region; extracellular space
Biological process	negative regulation of lactation; lactation; calcium ion transport; negative regulation of cysteine-type endopeptidase activity; transport
Sources:Amigo / QuickGO
Orthologs
Databases	NCBI: entry; OMA: entry
Species	Human	Mouse
Entrez	1447	12991
Ensembl	ENSG00000135222; ENSG00000283030	ENSMUSG00000063157
UniProt	P05814	P10598
RefSeq (mRNA)	NM_001302770; NM_001891; NM_001385731	NM_001286020; NM_001286021; NM_001286022; NM_001286023; NM_001286024 NM_009972
RefSeq (protein)	NP_001289699; NP_001882	NP_001272949; NP_001272950; NP_001272951; NP_001272952; NP_001272953 NP_034102
Location (UCSC)	Chr 4: 69.96 – 69.97 Mb	Chr 5: 87.84 – 87.85 Mb
PubMed search
- Wikidata
View/Edit Human	View/Edit Mouse

Beta-casein is a protein that in humans is encoded by the CSN2 gene. It is in the class of phosphoproteins and generally occurs in mammalian milk.

== See also ==
- Plant-produced beta-casein
