= COPS4 =

Protein-coding gene in humans

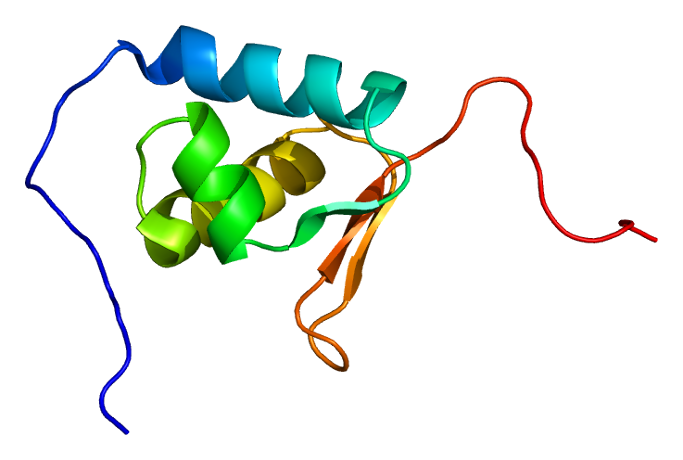

Identifiers
- Aliases: COPS4, CSN4, COP9 signalosome subunit 4, SGN4
- External IDs: OMIM: 616008; MGI: 1349414; GeneCards: COPS4
Available structures
PDB	Ortholog search: PDBe RCSB
PDB	List of PDB id codes 4D0P, 4D10, 4D18, 4WSN

Gene location (Human)
Chr.	Chromosome 4 (human)
Band	4q21.22	Start	83,034,447 bp
Band	4q21.22	End	83,075,818 bp

Gene location (Mouse)
Chr.	Chromosome 5 (mouse)
Band	5 E4|5 48.49 cM	Start	100,666,175 bp
Band	5 E4|5 48.49 cM	End	100,695,669 bp
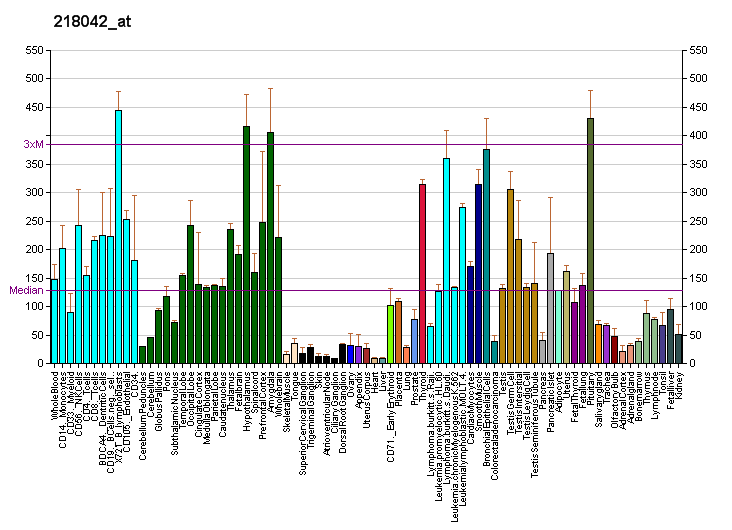
RNA expression pattern
Bgee	Human / Mouse (ortholog); Top expressed in: biceps brachii; vastus lateralis muscle; deltoid muscle; Skeletal muscle tissue of biceps brachii; glutes; thoracic diaphragm; Skeletal muscle tissue of rectus abdominis; tibialis anterior muscle; right ventricle; secondary oocyte / Top expressed in: spermatid; spermatocyte; maxillary prominence; mandibular prominence; tail of embryo; otic vesicle; seminiferous tubule; genital tubercle; otic placode; supraoptic nucleus; More reference expression data
BioGPS	More reference expression data
Gene ontology
Molecular function	protein binding; NEDD8-specific protease activity
Cellular component	cytoplasm; COP9 signalosome; cell junction; synapse; extracellular exosome; cytoplasmic vesicle; synaptic vesicle; nucleus; nucleoplasm; cytosol; nuclear speck
Biological process	transcription-coupled nucleotide-excision repair; nucleotide-excision repair, DNA damage recognition; protein deneddylation; post-translational protein modification
Sources:Amigo / QuickGO
Orthologs
Databases	NCBI: entry; OMA: entry
Species	Human	Mouse
Entrez	51138	26891
Ensembl	ENSG00000138663	ENSMUSG00000035297
UniProt	Q9BT78	O88544
RefSeq (mRNA)	NM_001258006; NM_016129; NM_001330727	NM_012001; NM_001359203; NM_001359204
RefSeq (protein)	NP_001244935; NP_001317656; NP_057213	NP_036131; NP_001346132; NP_001346133
Location (UCSC)	Chr 4: 83.03 – 83.08 Mb	Chr 5: 100.67 – 100.7 Mb
PubMed search
- Wikidata
View/Edit Human	View/Edit Mouse

COP9 signalosome complex subunit 4 is a protein that in humans is encoded by the COPS4 gene.

This gene encodes one of eight subunits composing COP9 signalosome, a highly conserved protein complex that functions as an important regulator in multiple signaling pathways. The structure and function of COP9 signalosome is similar to that of the 19S regulatory particle of 26S proteasome. COP9 signalosome has been shown to interact with SCF-type E3 ubiquitin ligases and act as a positive regulator of E3 ubiquitin ligases.
