= Czech technical standard =

Czech technical standard (ČSN) for technical, industrial and commercial standards, is a protected designation of Czech technical standards. Creation and issuance of ČSN is currently provided by the Czech Standardization Agency.

ČSN was also the official name of the Czechoslovak state standards (since 1951), and after 1991 the Czechoslovak standards (Czechoslovak technical standards). The successor to ČSN in Slovakia is STN (Slovak Technical Standard).

== See also ==
- International Organization for Standardization
