= CDC42 =

Protein-coding gene in humans

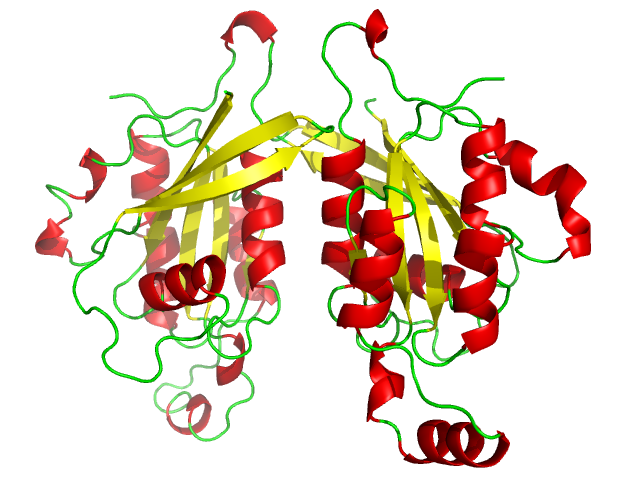

Identifiers
- Aliases: CDC42, CDC42Hs, G25K, TKS, cell division cycle 42
- External IDs: OMIM: 116952; MGI: 106211; GeneCards: CDC42
Available structures
PDB	Ortholog search: PDBe RCSB
PDB	List of PDB id codes 4YDH, 1A4R, 1AJE, 1AM4, 1AN0, 1CEE, 1CF4, 1DOA, 1E0A, 1EES, 1GRN, 1GZS, 1KI1, 1KZ7, 1KZG, 1NF3, 2ASE, 2DFK, 2KB0, 2NGR, 2ODB, 2QRZ, 2WM9, 2WMN, 2WMO, 3GCG, 3QBV, 3VHL, 4DID, 4ITR, 4JS0, 4YC7, 5FI1
Enzyme activity
EC #	BRENDA	ExPASy	KEGG	MetaCyc
3.6.5.2	↗	↗	↗	↗

Gene location (Human)
Chr.	Chromosome 1 (human)
Band	1p36.12	Start	22,052,627 bp
Band	1p36.12	End	22,101,360 bp

Gene location (Mouse)
Chr.	Chromosome 4 (mouse)
Band	4 D3|4 69.83 cM	Start	137,319,696 bp
Band	4 D3|4 69.83 cM	End	137,357,720 bp
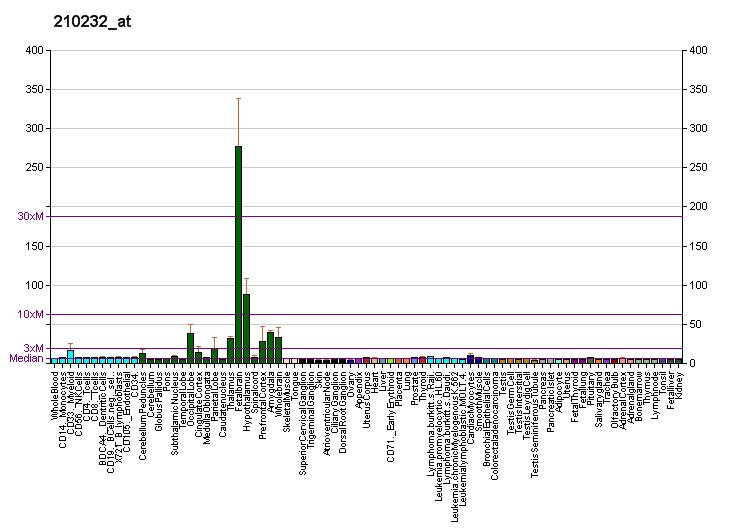

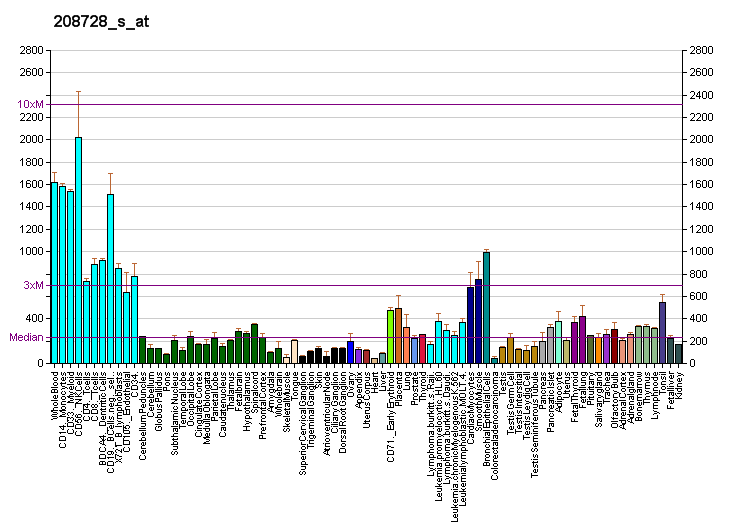

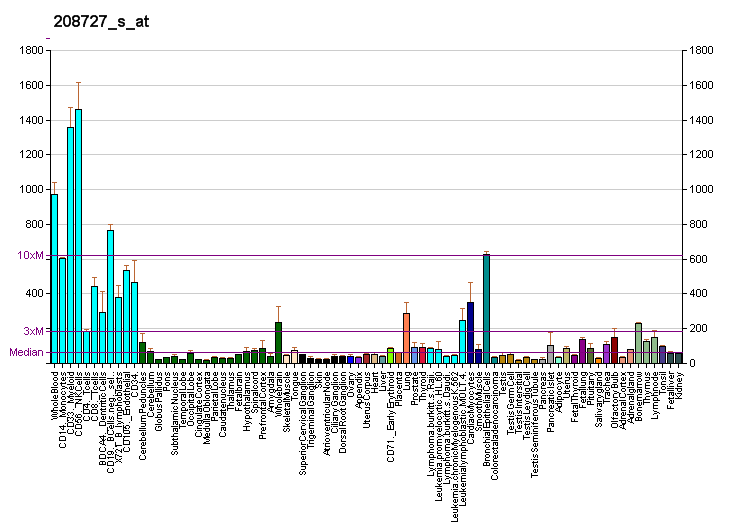
RNA expression pattern
Bgee	Human / Mouse (ortholog); Top expressed in: monocyte; islet of Langerhans; rectum; ganglionic eminence; gallbladder; epithelium of colon; smooth muscle tissue; olfactory zone of nasal mucosa; granulocyte; ventricular zone / Top expressed in: ascending aorta; aortic valve; Epithelium of choroid plexus; endothelial cell of lymphatic vessel; stroma of bone marrow; medullary collecting duct; renal corpuscle; molar; vestibular sensory epithelium; dermis; More reference expression data
BioGPS	More reference expression data
Gene ontology
Molecular function	Rho GDP-dissociation inhibitor binding; ubiquitin protein ligase activity; apolipoprotein A-I receptor binding; GTP-dependent protein binding; GTPase activity; mitogen-activated protein kinase kinase kinase binding; protein binding; thioesterase binding; protein kinase binding; nucleotide binding; GTP binding; identical protein binding; protein serine/threonine kinase activity; GBD domain binding
Cellular component	cytoplasm; cytosol; membrane; cell-cell junction; focal adhesion; microtubule organizing center; spindle midzone; neuron projection; storage vacuole; cytoskeleton; cell projection; myelin sheath; extracellular exosome; filopodium; plasma membrane; spindle; apical part of cell; secretory granule; soma; cytoplasmic ribonucleoprotein granule; mitotic spindle; leading edge membrane; cell periphery; endoplasmic reticulum membrane; Golgi membrane; midbody; centrosome; cell cortex; Golgi transport complex; protein-containing complex; dendritic spine
Biological process	cardiac conduction system development; positive regulation of protein phosphorylation; negative regulation of epidermal growth factor receptor signaling pathway; positive regulation of muscle cell differentiation; nuclear migration; keratinization; positive regulation of JNK cascade; establishment of Golgi localization; actin filament bundle assembly; positive regulation of neuron apoptotic process; vascular endothelial growth factor receptor signaling pathway; hair follicle morphogenesis; heart contraction; regulation of protein stability; neuron fate determination; substantia nigra development; Fc-gamma receptor signaling pathway involved in phagocytosis; actin filament organization; negative regulation of protein-containing complex assembly; epithelial-mesenchymal cell signaling; actin filament branching; negative regulation of gene expression; positive regulation of peptidyl-serine phosphorylation; establishment or maintenance of cell polarity; positive regulation of cell growth; regulation of protein metabolic process; establishment or maintenance of apical/basal cell polarity; regulation of protein kinase activity; regulation of attachment of spindle microtubules to kinetochore; regulation of small GTPase mediated signal transduction; positive regulation of hair follicle cell proliferation; positive regulation of MAPK cascade; regulation of mitotic nuclear division; hair follicle placode formation; positive regulation of intracellular protein transport; cell differentiation; positive regulation of epithelial cell proliferation involved in lung morphogenesis; regulation of protein heterodimerization activity; Golgi organization; positive regulation of synapse structural plasticity; multicellular organism growth; epidermis morphogenesis; nucleus localization; epithelial cell-cell adhesion; sprouting angiogenesis; nervous system development; macrophage differentiation; dendritic cell migration; positive regulation of cytokinesis; positive regulation of DNA replication; Wnt signaling pathway, planar cell polarity pathway; keratinocyte development; regulation of protein catabolic process; canonical Wnt signaling pathway; adherens junction organization; organelle transport along microtubule; actin cytoskeleton organization; regulation of filopodium assembly; endocytosis; ephrin receptor signaling pathway; filopodium assembly; T cell costimulation; blood coagulation; positive regulation of phosphatidylinositol 3-kinase activity; positive regulation of substrate adhesion-dependent cell spreading; positive regulation of gene expression; positive regulation of pseudopodium assembly; submandibular salivary gland formation; viral RNA genome replication; small GTPase mediated signal transduction; protein ubiquitination; positive regulation of catalytic activity; protein phosphorylation; phagocytosis, engulfment; integrin-mediated signaling pathway; Rho protein signal transduction; regulation of cell shape; regulation of lamellipodium assembly; positive regulation of lamellipodium assembly; cell projection assembly; Cdc42 protein signal transduction; regulation of actin cytoskeleton organization; cell junction assembly; interleukin-12-mediated signaling pathway; neuropilin signaling pathway; establishment of epithelial cell apical/basal polarity; positive regulation of filopodium assembly; regulation of stress fiber assembly; positive regulation of stress fiber assembly; dendritic spine morphogenesis; modification of synaptic structure; positive regulation of actin cytoskeleton reorganization
Sources:Amigo / QuickGO
Orthologs
Databases	NCBI: entry; OMA: entry
Species	Human	Mouse
Entrez	998	12540
Ensembl	ENSG00000070831	ENSMUSG00000006699
UniProt	P60953	P60766
RefSeq (mRNA)	NM_044472; NM_001039802; NM_001791	NM_001243769; NM_009861
RefSeq (protein)	NP_001034891; NP_001782; NP_426359	NP_001230698; NP_033991
Location (UCSC)	Chr 1: 22.05 – 22.1 Mb	Chr 4: 137.32 – 137.36 Mb
PubMed search
- Wikidata
View/Edit Human	View/Edit Mouse

Cell division control protein 42 homolog (Cdc42 or CDC42) is a protein that in humans is encoded by the CDC42 gene. Cdc42 is involved in regulation of the cell cycle. It was originally identified in S. cerevisiae (yeast) as a mediator of cell division, and is now known to influence a variety of signaling events and cellular processes in a variety of organisms from yeast to mammals.

== Function ==
Human Cdc42 is a small GTPase of the Rho family, which regulates signaling pathways that control diverse cellular functions including cell morphology, cell migration, endocytosis, cell polarity and cell cycle progression. Rho GTPases are central to dynamic actin cytoskeletal assembly and rearrangement that are the basis of cell-cell adhesion and migration. Activated Cdc42 activates by causing conformational changes in p21-activated kinases PAK1 and PAK2, which in turn initiate actin reorganization and regulate cell adhesion, migration, and invasion.

== Structure ==
Cdc42 is a homodimer with A and B chains. Its total length is 191 amino acids and its theoretical weight is 21.33 kDa. Its sequence domains include a P-loop containing nucleoside triphosphate hydrolase and a small GTP-binding protein domain.

Cdc42 cycles between an active GTP-bound state and an inactive GDP-bound state. This process is regulated by guanine nucleotide exchange factors (GEFs) which promote the exchange of bound GDP for free GTP, GTPase activating proteins (GAPs) which increase GTP hydrolysis activity, and GDP dissociation inhibitors which inhibit the dissociation of the nucleotide from the GTPase.

== Role in cancer ==
Recently, Cdc42 has been shown to actively assist in cancer progression. Several studies have established the basis for this and hypothesized about the underlying mechanisms.

Cdc42 is overexpressed in non-small cell lung cancer, colorectal adenocarcinoma, melanoma, breast cancer, and testicular cancer. Elevated levels of the protein have been correlated with negative patient survival. Cdc42 has also been shown to be required for both G1-S phase progression and mitosis, and it also modulates the transcription factors SRF, STAT3, and NFkB. It has been hypothesized that targeting Cdc42 in conjunction with chemotherapy may be an effective cancer treatment strategy.

In one study studying the role of Cdc42 in cervical cancer, immunohistochemistry was used to detect Cdc42 expression in three types of tissues: normal cervical tissues, cervical intraepithelial neoplasia (CIN) I or below, CIN II or above, and cervical cancer tissues. Cdc42 expression was gradually increased showing significant difference and was significantly higher in HeLa cells than in regular cells. The migration ability of HeLa cells transfected with Cdc42 was higher than that of non-transfected cells. It was proposed that the overexpression of Cdc42 can promote filopodia formation in HeLa cells. Cdc42 overexpression significantly improved the ability of cervical cancer cells to migrate, possibly due to improved pseudopodia formation.

Another study found that Cdc42 drives the process of initiating a metastatic tumor in a new tissue by promoting the expression of β1 integrin, an adhesion receptor known to be involved in metastasis. Levels of β1 integrin were reduced in Cdc42-deficient cells. β1 integrin is important for adhesion to the extracellular matrix, and could be important for the initial attachment to endothelial cells as well. Knocking down β1 integrin inhibited cancer cell migration, whereas overexpressing the integrin in Cdc42-deficient cells restored endothelial invasion. Cdc42 promoted β1 integrin expression by activating a transcription factor called SRF. A continually active form of the transcription factor was also capable of restoring endothelial insertion to cancer cells lacking Cdc42.

Normal cancer cells and Cdc42-deficient cancer cells have also been compared in vivo. When both types of cells were injected into mouse tail veins, control cells spread out more on the vessel endothelium within minutes, suggesting that Cdc42 assists in cell migration. After six weeks, the control cells had generated more metastases than the Cdc42-deficient cells. Invading cancer cells send out protrusions that reach down between neighboring endothelial cells to contact the underlying basement membrane. The cancer cells then spread out on this extracellular matrix so that the endothelial cells retract, and allow the invaders to insert themselves between them. In the absence of Cdc42, cancer cells failed to spread out on the basement membrane, and Cdc42-deficient cells showed reduced adhesion to extracellular matrix-coated coverslips. Cdc42 therefore promotes the attachment of cancer cells to both endothelial cells and the underlying basement membrane during transendothelial migration.

The small molecular inhibitor AZA197 has been used to inhibit Cdc42 in the treatment of KRAS mutant colorectal cancers. There was evidence that Cdc42 inhibition by AZA197 treatment suppresses proliferative and pro-survival signaling pathways via PAK1-ERK signaling and reduces colon cancer cell migration and invasion. In mice, systemic AZA197 treatment in vivo reduced primary tumor growth and prolonged survival. Therapy targeting Rho GTPase Cdc42 signaling pathways may be effective for treatment of patients with advanced colon cancer overexpressing Cdc42, and particularly those with KRAS-mutant disease.

== Takenouchi-Kosaki syndrome ==
Mutations in the CDC42 gene are responsible for the Takenouchi-Kosaki syndrome, an autosomal-dominant complex congenital developmental disorder associated with thrombocytopenia. Alleic variants that are associated with the syndrome include mutations in the CDC42 gene that are expressed at the protein level as Ile21Thr, Tyr64Cys, Arg66Gly, Cys81Phe, Ser83Pro, or Glu171Lys.

== Interactions ==
CDC42 has been shown to interact with:

- ARHGAP1,
- ARHGDIA,
- BAIAP2,
- BNIP2,
- BNIPL,
- CDC42EP2,
- CDC42EP3,
- ERRFI1,
- GDI1,
- IQGAP1,
- IQGAP2,
- ITSN1,
- MAP3K10,
- MAP3K11,
- PAK1,
- PAK2,
- PAK4.
- PAK7,
- PARD6A,
- PARD6B,
- Phospholipase D1,
- RICS
- TRIP10,
- WASL,
- Wiskott–Aldrich syndrome protein,

== See also ==
- ROP GTPase
