= GPS1 =

Protein-coding gene in the species Homo sapiens

Identifiers
- Aliases: GPS1, COPS1, CSN1, SGN1, G protein pathway suppressor 1
- External IDs: OMIM: 601934; MGI: 2384801; GeneCards: GPS1
Available structures
PDB	Ortholog search: PDBe RCSB
PDB	List of PDB id codes 4D10, 4D18, 4WSN

Gene location (Human)
Chr.	Chromosome 17 (human)
Band	17q25.3	Start	82,050,691 bp
Band	17q25.3	End	82,057,470 bp

Gene location (Mouse)
Chr.	Chromosome 11 (mouse)
Band	11|11 E2	Start	120,675,098 bp
Band	11|11 E2	End	120,679,928 bp
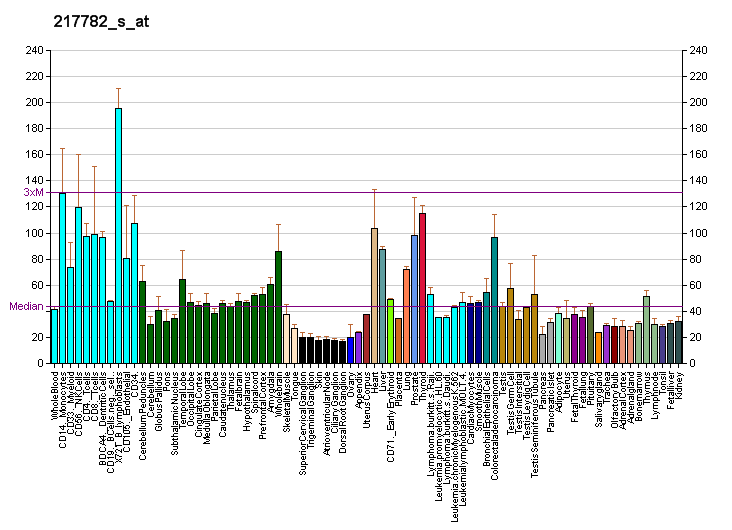
RNA expression pattern
Bgee	Human / Mouse (ortholog); Top expressed in: apex of heart; muscle of thigh; right hemisphere of cerebellum; gastrocnemius muscle; right frontal lobe; anterior pituitary; right testis; left testis; ganglionic eminence; right lobe of liver / Top expressed in: spermatocyte; lens; mesencephalon; neural tube; rhombencephalon; adrenal gland; dentate gyrus of hippocampal formation granule cell; olfactory bulb; ventricular zone; striatum of neuraxis; More reference expression data
BioGPS	More reference expression data
Gene ontology
Molecular function	GTPase inhibitor activity; protein binding
Cellular component	cytoplasm; COP9 signalosome; nucleus; nucleoplasm; cytosol
Biological process	JNK cascade; transcription-coupled nucleotide-excision repair; nucleotide-excision repair, DNA damage recognition; negative regulation of GTPase activity; protein deneddylation; post-translational protein modification
Sources:Amigo / QuickGO
Orthologs
Databases	NCBI: entry; OMA: entry
Species	Human	Mouse
Entrez	2873	209318
Ensembl	ENSG00000169727	ENSMUSG00000025156
UniProt	Q13098	Q99LD4
RefSeq (mRNA)	NM_004127; NM_212492; NM_001321089; NM_001321090; NM_001321091 NM_001321092; NM_001321093; NM_001330539; NM_001330541	NM_001177874; NM_145370; NM_001346709; NM_001363440
RefSeq (protein)	NP_001308018; NP_001308019; NP_001308020; NP_001308021; NP_001308022 NP_001317468; NP_001317470; NP_004118; NP_997657	n/a
Location (UCSC)	Chr 17: 82.05 – 82.06 Mb	Chr 11: 120.68 – 120.68 Mb
PubMed search
- Wikidata
View/Edit Human	View/Edit Mouse

The COP9 signalosome complex subunit 1 is a protein encoded by the GPS1 gene.

This gene is known to inhibit G-protein and mitogen-activated signal transduction in mammalian cells. The protein encoded by this gene shares significant similarity with Arabidopsis FUS6, a regulator of light-mediated signal transduction in plant cells. Two alternatively spliced transcript variants encoding distinct isoforms have been identified for this gene.
