= COPS2 =

Protein-coding gene in humans

Identifiers
- Aliases: COPS2, ALIEN, CSN2, SGN2, TRIP15, COP9 signalosome subunit 2
- External IDs: OMIM: 604508; MGI: 1330276; GeneCards: COPS2
Available structures
PDB	Ortholog search: PDBe RCSB
PDB	List of PDB id codes 4D10, 4D18, 4WSN

Gene location (Human)
Chr.	Chromosome 15 (human)
Band	15q21.1	Start	49,106,068 bp
Band	15q21.1	End	49,155,661 bp

Gene location (Mouse)
Chr.	Chromosome 2 (mouse)
Band	2 F1|2 61.76 cM	Start	125,672,224 bp
Band	2 F1|2 61.76 cM	End	125,701,059 bp
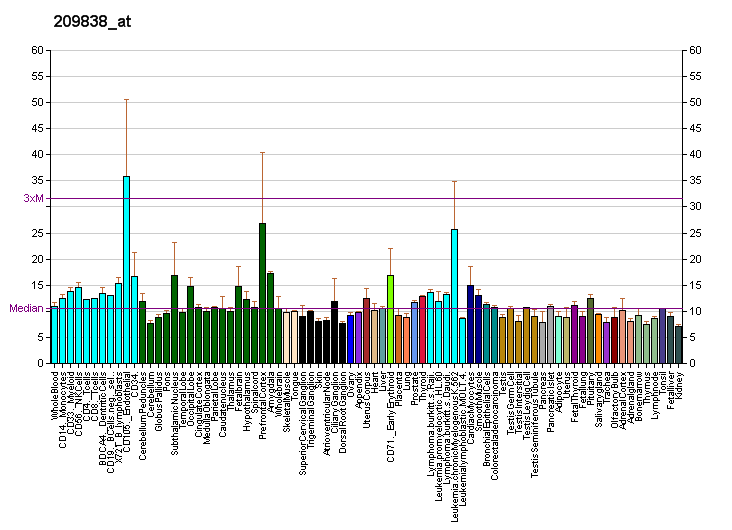

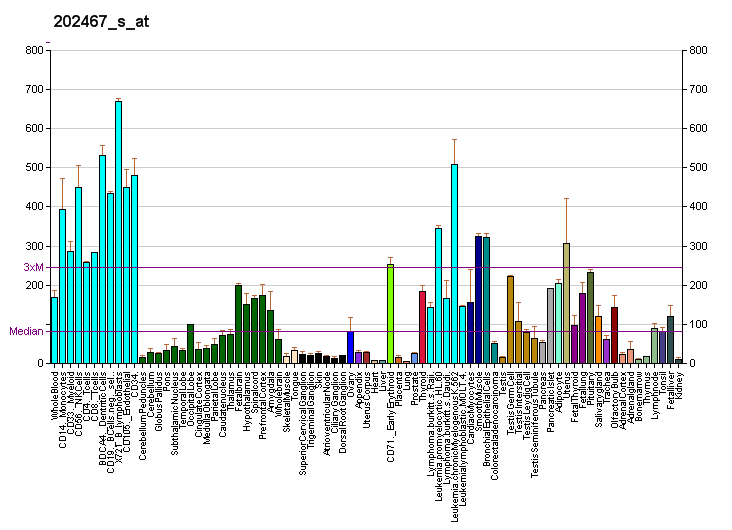
RNA expression pattern
Bgee	Human / Mouse (ortholog); Top expressed in: cartilage tissue; thoracic diaphragm; Achilles tendon; parietal pleura; gingival epithelium; tail of epididymis; glutes; amniotic fluid; corpus epididymis; germinal epithelium / Top expressed in: otic placode; saccule; tail of embryo; genital tubercle; otic vesicle; mandibular prominence; maxillary prominence; abdominal wall; cumulus cell; somite; More reference expression data
BioGPS	More reference expression data
Gene ontology
Molecular function	protein binding; signal transducer activity; transcription corepressor activity
Cellular component	nucleoplasm; nucleus; COP9 signalosome; cytoplasm; cytosol
Biological process	negative regulation of transcription by RNA polymerase II; transcription by RNA polymerase II; nucleotide-excision repair, DNA damage recognition; neuron differentiation; cell population proliferation; signal transduction; negative regulation of nucleic acid-templated transcription; skeletal muscle cell differentiation; transcription-coupled nucleotide-excision repair; neurogenesis; negative regulation of transcription, DNA-templated; protein deneddylation; post-translational protein modification; protein phosphorylation; inner cell mass cell proliferation
Sources:Amigo / QuickGO
Orthologs
Databases	NCBI: entry; OMA: entry
Species	Human	Mouse
Entrez	9318	12848
Ensembl	ENSG00000166200	ENSMUSG00000027206
UniProt	P61201	P61202
RefSeq (mRNA)	NM_004236; NM_001143887	NM_001285507; NM_001285512; NM_001285513; NM_009939
RefSeq (protein)	NP_001137359; NP_004227	NP_001272436; NP_001272441; NP_001272442; NP_034069
Location (UCSC)	Chr 15: 49.11 – 49.16 Mb	Chr 2: 125.67 – 125.7 Mb
PubMed search
- Wikidata
View/Edit Human	View/Edit Mouse

COP9 signalosome complex subunit 2 is a protein that in humans is encoded by the COPS2 gene. It encodes a subunit of the COP9 signalosome.

== Interactions ==
COPS2 has been shown to interact with:

- DAX1,
- IRF8,
- NIF3L1, and
- THRA.
