= COPS6 =

Protein-coding gene in humans

Identifiers
- Aliases: COPS6, CSN6, MOV34-34KD, COP9 signalosome subunit 6
- External IDs: OMIM: 614729; MGI: 1349439; GeneCards: COPS6
Available structures
PDB	Ortholog search: PDBe RCSB
PDB	List of PDB id codes 4D10, 4D18, 4QFT, 4R14, 4WSN

Gene location (Human)
Chr.	Chromosome 7 (human)
Band	7q22.1	Start	100,088,969 bp
Band	7q22.1	End	100,092,187 bp

Gene location (Mouse)
Chr.	Chromosome 5 (mouse)
Band	5|5 G2	Start	138,159,333 bp
Band	5|5 G2	End	138,162,908 bp
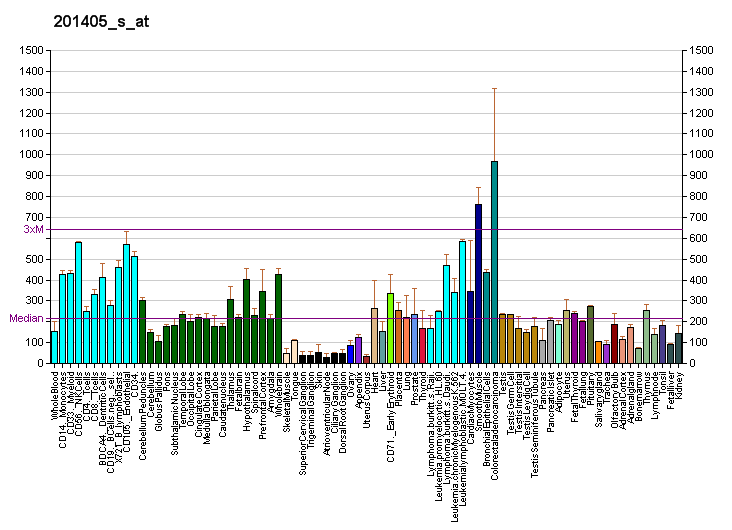

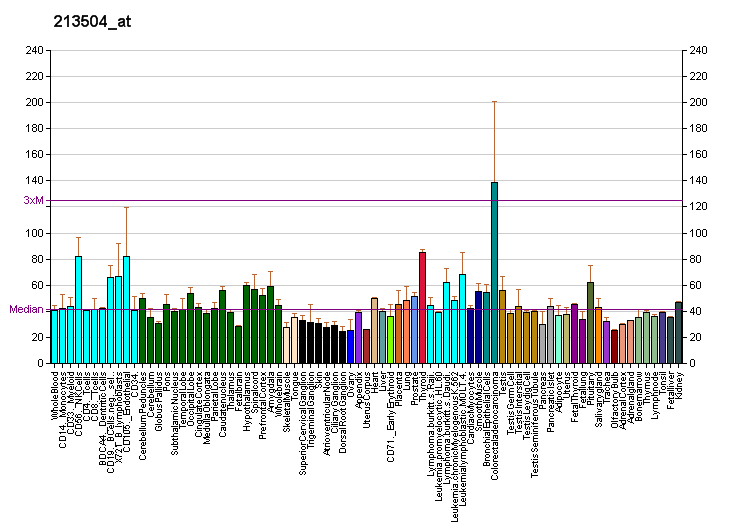
RNA expression pattern
Bgee	Human / Mouse (ortholog); Top expressed in: stromal cell of endometrium; apex of heart; muscle of thigh; right frontal lobe; anterior pituitary; muscle layer of sigmoid colon; body of uterus; nucleus accumbens; right hemisphere of cerebellum; ectocervix / Top expressed in: medial ganglionic eminence; right kidney; interventricular septum; efferent ductule; lens; abdominal wall; epithelium of lens; endothelial cell of lymphatic vessel; yolk sac; neural tube; More reference expression data
BioGPS	More reference expression data
Gene ontology
Molecular function	protein binding
Cellular component	cytoplasm; COP9 signalosome; nucleus; nucleoplasm; cytosol
Biological process	transcription-coupled nucleotide-excision repair; viral process; nucleotide-excision repair, DNA damage recognition; protein deneddylation; post-translational protein modification
Sources:Amigo / QuickGO
Orthologs
Databases	NCBI: entry; OMA: entry
Species	Human	Mouse
Entrez	10980	26893
Ensembl	ENSG00000168090	ENSMUSG00000019494
UniProt	Q7L5N1	O88545
RefSeq (mRNA)	NM_006833	NM_012002
RefSeq (protein)	NP_006824	NP_036132
Location (UCSC)	Chr 7: 100.09 – 100.09 Mb	Chr 5: 138.16 – 138.16 Mb
PubMed search
- Wikidata
View/Edit Human	View/Edit Mouse

COP9 signalosome complex subunit 6 is a protein that in humans is encoded by the COPS6 gene.

== Function ==
The protein encoded by this gene is one of the eight subunits of COP9 signalosome, a highly conserved protein complex that functions as an important regulator in multiple signaling pathways. The structure and function of COP9 signalosome is similar to that of the 19S regulatory particle of 26S proteasome. COP9 signalosome has been shown to interact with SCF-type E3 ubiquitin ligases and act as a positive regulator of E3 ubiquitin ligases. This protein belongs to translation initiation factor 3 (eIF3) superfamily. It is involved in the regulation of cell cycle and likely to be a cellular cofactor for HIV-1 accessory gene product Vpr.

== Interactions ==
COPS6 has been shown to interact with EIF3S6.
