= RHOQ =

Protein-coding gene in the species Homo sapiens

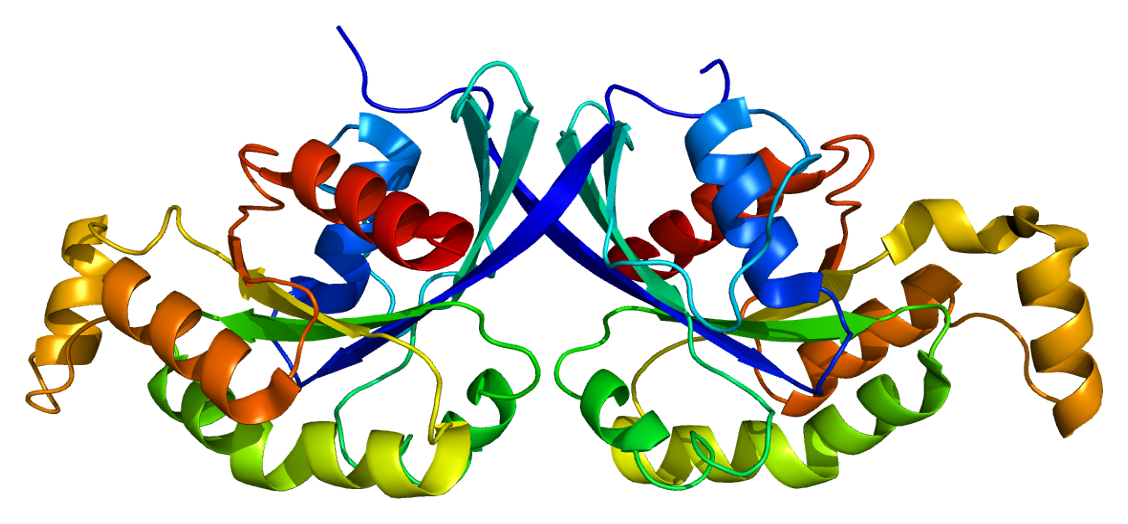

Identifiers
- Aliases: RHOQ, ARHQ, HEL-S-42, RASL7A, TC10, TC10A, ras homolog family member Q
- External IDs: OMIM: 605857; MGI: 1931553; GeneCards: RHOQ
Available structures
PDB	Ortholog search: PDBe RCSB
PDB	List of PDB id codes 2ATX
Enzyme activity
EC #	BRENDA	ExPASy	KEGG	MetaCyc
3.6.5.2	↗	↗	↗	↗

Gene location (Human)
Chr.	Chromosome 2 (human)
Band	2p21	Start	46,541,806 bp
Band	2p21	End	46,584,688 bp

Gene location (Mouse)
Chr.	Chromosome 17 (mouse)
Band	17 E4|17 56.9 cM	Start	87,270,510 bp
Band	17 E4|17 56.9 cM	End	87,307,497 bp
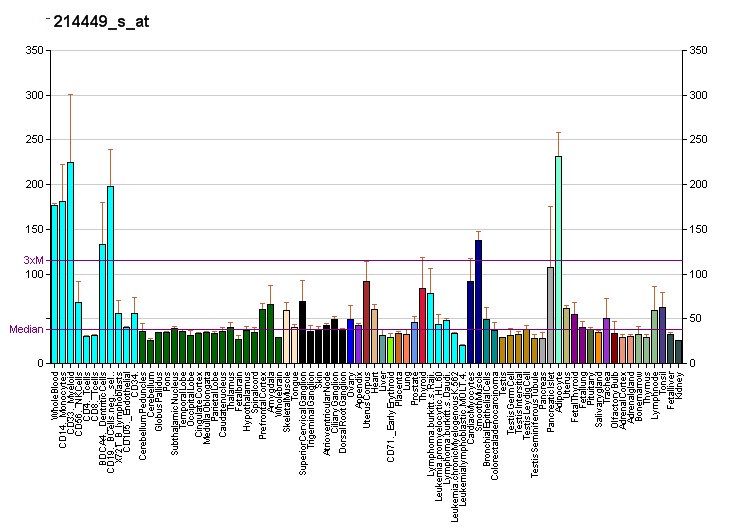

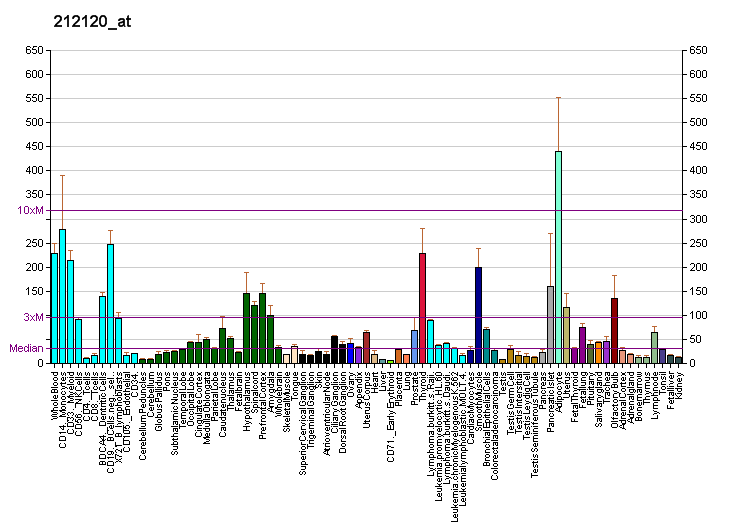

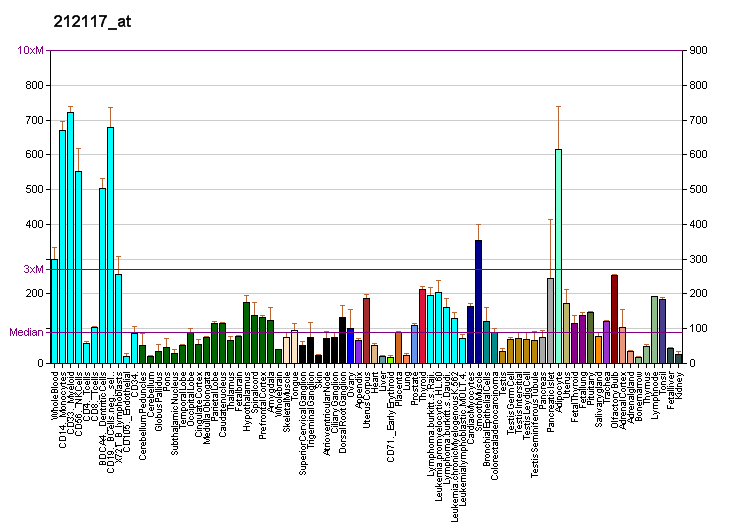
RNA expression pattern
Bgee	Human / Mouse (ortholog); Top expressed in: myocardium of left ventricle; right ventricle; Achilles tendon; Skeletal muscle tissue of biceps brachii; Skeletal muscle tissue of rectus abdominis; vastus lateralis muscle; thoracic diaphragm; cardiac muscle tissue of right atrium; Epithelium of choroid plexus; muscle of thigh / Top expressed in: parotid gland; lacrimal gland; submandibular gland; sternocleidomastoid muscle; temporal muscle; triceps brachii muscle; vastus lateralis muscle; ankle; digastric muscle; atrioventricular valve; More reference expression data
BioGPS	More reference expression data
Gene ontology
Molecular function	GBD domain binding; profilin binding; nucleotide binding; GTP binding; GTPase activity; protein kinase binding
Cellular component	cytoplasm; cytosol; membrane; plasma membrane; actin filament; membrane raft; Golgi-associated vesicle membrane; extracellular exosome; intracellular anatomical structure; cell cortex; cell projection
Biological process	positive regulation of glucose import; insulin receptor signaling pathway; regulation of actin cytoskeleton organization; regulation of cell shape; cellular response to insulin stimulus; regulation of small GTPase mediated signal transduction; cortical actin cytoskeleton organization; positive regulation of filopodium assembly; positive regulation of transcription by RNA polymerase II; GTP metabolic process; small GTPase mediated signal transduction; negative regulation of protein localization to plasma membrane; endocytosis; actin filament organization; establishment or maintenance of cell polarity; Rho protein signal transduction; cell projection assembly; actin cytoskeleton organization
Sources:Amigo / QuickGO
Orthologs
Databases	NCBI: entry; OMA: entry
Species	Human	Mouse
Entrez	23433	104215
Ensembl	ENSG00000119729	ENSMUSG00000024143
UniProt	P17081	Q8R527
RefSeq (mRNA)	NM_012249	NM_145491
RefSeq (protein)	NP_036381	NP_663466
Location (UCSC)	Chr 2: 46.54 – 46.58 Mb	Chr 17: 87.27 – 87.31 Mb
PubMed search
- Wikidata
View/Edit Human	View/Edit Mouse

Rho-related GTP-binding protein RhoQ is a protein that in humans is encoded by the RHOQ gene.

TC10 is a member of the RAS superfamily of small GTP-binding proteins (see HRAS, MIM 190020) involved in insulin-stimulated glucose uptake.[supplied by OMIM]

In melanocytic cells RHOQ gene expression may be regulated by MITF.

== Interactions ==
RHOQ has been shown to interact with EXOC7, GOPC, PARD6B, WASL, CDC42EP2, TRIP10 and CDC42EP3.
