= COPS8 =

Protein-coding gene in humans

Identifiers
- Aliases: COPS8, COP9, CSN8, SGN8, COP9 signalosome subunit 8
- External IDs: OMIM: 616011; MGI: 1915363; GeneCards: COPS8
Available structures
PDB	Ortholog search: PDBe RCSB
PDB	List of PDB id codes 4D10, 4D18, 4WSN

Gene location (Human)
Chr.	Chromosome 2 (human)
Band	2q37.3	Start	237,085,882 bp
Band	2q37.3	End	237,100,474 bp

Gene location (Mouse)
Chr.	Chromosome 1 (mouse)
Band	1|1 D	Start	90,530,703 bp
Band	1|1 D	End	90,541,063 bp
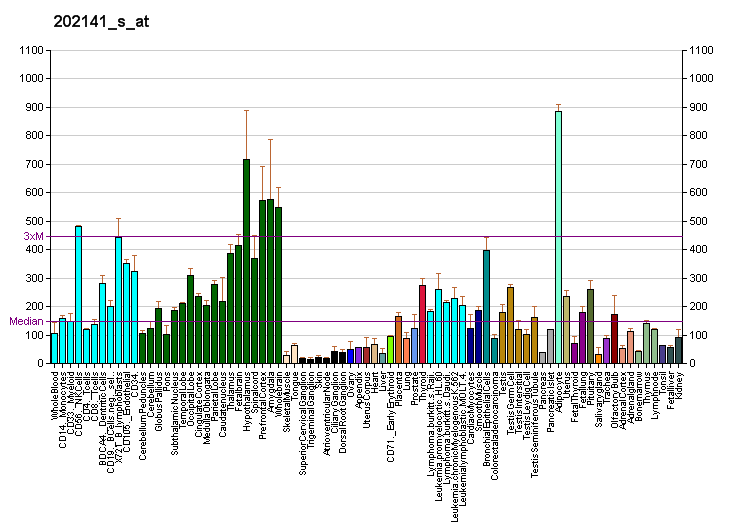

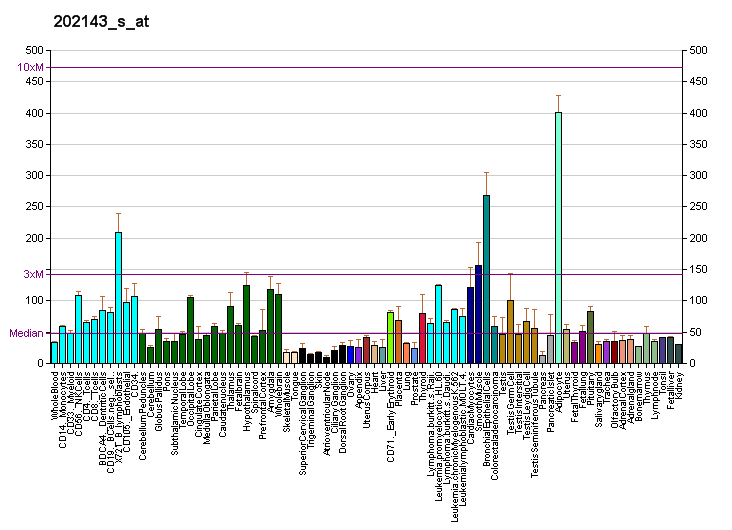

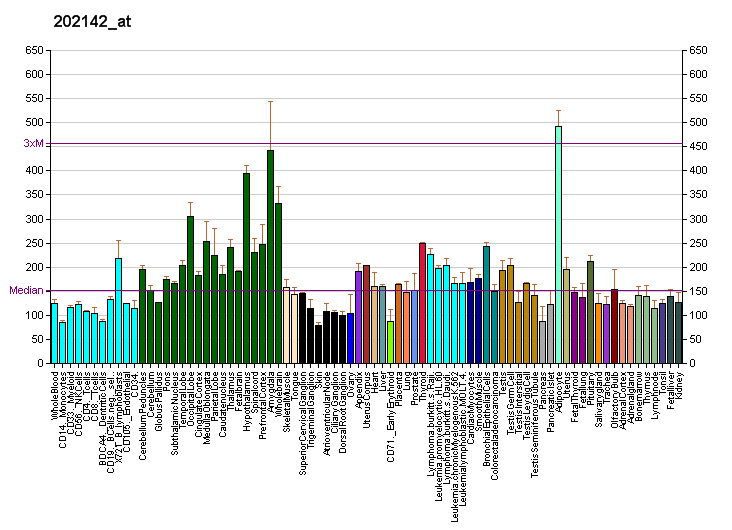
RNA expression pattern
Bgee	Human / Mouse (ortholog); Top expressed in: secondary oocyte; endothelial cell; lateral nuclear group of thalamus; Brodmann area 23; middle temporal gyrus; pars reticulata; pars compacta; pons; Skeletal muscle tissue of biceps brachii; external globus pallidus / Top expressed in: spermatocyte; yolk sac; facial motor nucleus; ventricular zone; muscle of thigh; primary oocyte; primitive streak; neural tube; secondary oocyte; dentate gyrus of hippocampal formation granule cell; More reference expression data
BioGPS	More reference expression data
Gene ontology
Molecular function	protein binding
Cellular component	perinuclear region of cytoplasm; extracellular exosome; nucleus; nucleoplasm; cytoplasm; cytosol; COP9 signalosome
Biological process	transcription-coupled nucleotide-excision repair; activation of NF-kappaB-inducing kinase activity; nucleotide-excision repair, DNA damage recognition; negative regulation of cell population proliferation; COP9 signalosome assembly; protein deneddylation; post-translational protein modification; protein phosphorylation
Sources:Amigo / QuickGO
Orthologs
Databases	NCBI: entry; OMA: entry
Species	Human	Mouse
Entrez	10920	108679
Ensembl	ENSG00000198612	ENSMUSG00000034432
UniProt	Q99627	Q8VBV7
RefSeq (mRNA)	NM_198189; NM_006710	NM_133805
RefSeq (protein)	NP_006701; NP_937832	NP_598566
Location (UCSC)	Chr 2: 237.09 – 237.1 Mb	Chr 1: 90.53 – 90.54 Mb
PubMed search
- Wikidata
View/Edit Human	View/Edit Mouse

COP9 signalosome complex subunit 8 is a protein that in humans is encoded by the COPS8 gene.

The protein encoded by this gene is the smallest of the eight subunits of COP9 signalosome, a highly conserved protein complex that functions as an important regulator in multiple signaling pathways. The structure and function of COP9 signalosome is related to that of the 19S regulatory particle of 26S proteasome. COP9 signalosome has been shown to interact with SCF-type E3 ubiquitin ligases and act as a positive regulator of E3 ubiquitin ligases. Alternatively spliced transcript variants encoding distinct isoforms have been observed.
