= COP9 signalosome complex subunit 3 =

Protein-coding gene in the species Homo sapiens

COPS3

Identifiers
- Aliases: COPS3, CSN3, SGN3, COP9 signalosome subunit 3
- External IDs: OMIM: 604665; MGI: 1349409; GeneCards: COPS3
Available structures
PDB	Ortholog search: PDBe RCSB
PDB	List of PDB id codes 4D10, 4D18, 4WSN

Gene location (Human)
Chr.	Chromosome 17 (human)
Band	17p11.2	Start	17,246,616 bp
Band	17p11.2	End	17,281,273 bp

Gene location (Mouse)
Chr.	Chromosome 11 (mouse)
Band	11|11 B1.3	Start	59,817,795 bp
Band	11|11 B1.3	End	59,839,838 bp
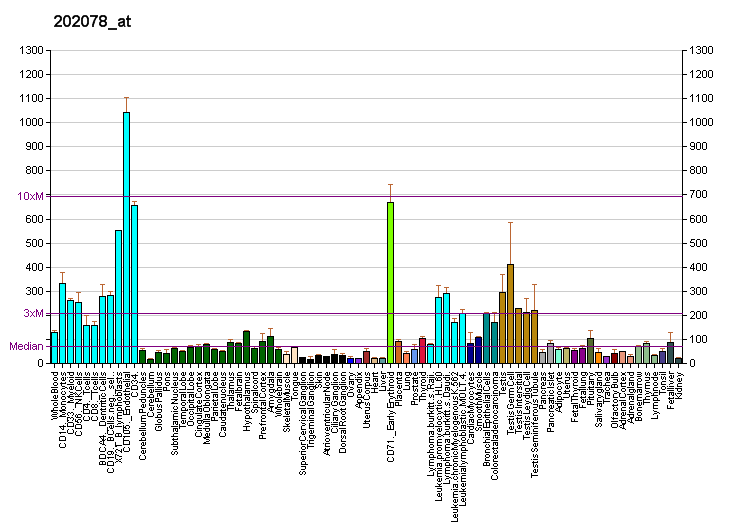
RNA expression pattern
Bgee	Human / Mouse (ortholog); Top expressed in: gastrocnemius muscle; gonad; muscle of thigh; ganglionic eminence; right testis; left testis; skeletal muscle tissue; Skeletal muscle tissue of rectus abdominis; vastus lateralis muscle; muscle of arm / Top expressed in: spermatocyte; facial motor nucleus; medial ganglionic eminence; spermatid; abdominal wall; mandibular prominence; maxillary prominence; intercostal muscle; primitive streak; endocardial cushion; More reference expression data
BioGPS	More reference expression data
Gene ontology
Molecular function	protein binding
Cellular component	COP9 signalosome; nucleus; nucleoplasm; cytoplasm; cytosol
Biological process	transcription-coupled nucleotide-excision repair; in utero embryonic development; ubiquitin-dependent protein catabolic process; nucleotide-excision repair, DNA damage recognition; signal transduction; response to light stimulus; protein deneddylation; post-translational protein modification
Sources:Amigo / QuickGO
Orthologs
Databases	NCBI: entry; OMA: entry
Species	Human	Mouse
Entrez	8533	26572
Ensembl	ENSG00000141030	ENSMUSG00000019373
UniProt	Q9UNS2	O88543
RefSeq (mRNA)	NM_001199125; NM_003653; NM_001316354; NM_001316355; NM_001316356 NM_001316357; NM_001316358	NM_011991
RefSeq (protein)	NP_001186054; NP_001303283; NP_001303284; NP_001303285; NP_001303286 NP_001303287; NP_003644	NP_036121
Location (UCSC)	Chr 17: 17.25 – 17.28 Mb	Chr 11: 59.82 – 59.84 Mb
PubMed search
- Wikidata
View/Edit Human	View/Edit Mouse

COP9 signalosome complex subunit 3 is a protein that in humans is encoded by the COPS3 gene. It encodes a subunit of the COP9 signalosome.

The protein encoded by this gene possesses kinase activity that phosphorylates regulators involved in signal transduction. It phosphorylates I-kappa-B-alpha, p105, and c-Jun. It acts as a docking site for complex-mediated phosphorylation. The gene is located within the Smith-Magenis syndrome region on chromosome 17.

== See also ==
- Signalosome
