= COPS7A =

Protein-coding gene in humans

Identifiers
- Aliases: COPS7A, CSN7A, SGN7a, CSN7, COP9 signalosome subunit 7A
- External IDs: OMIM: 616009; MGI: 1349400; GeneCards: COPS7A
Available structures
PDB	Ortholog search: PDBe RCSB
PDB	List of PDB id codes 4D10, 4D18, 4WSN

Gene location (Human)
Chr.	Chromosome 12 (human)
Band	12p13.31	Start	6,724,014 bp
Band	12p13.31	End	6,731,875 bp

Gene location (Mouse)
Chr.	Chromosome 6 (mouse)
Band	6 F2|6 59.17 cM	Start	124,935,376 bp
Band	6 F2|6 59.17 cM	End	124,942,501 bp
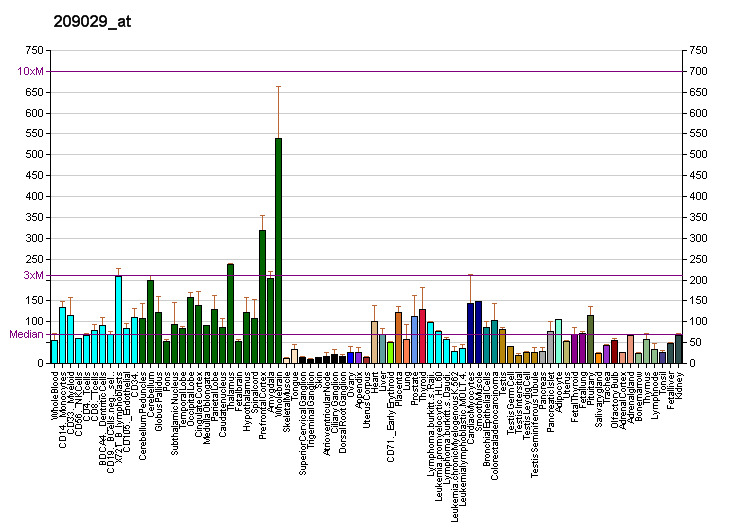
RNA expression pattern
Bgee	Human / Mouse (ortholog); Top expressed in: prefrontal cortex; stromal cell of endometrium; right frontal lobe; cingulate gyrus; anterior cingulate cortex; Brodmann area 9; apex of heart; right adrenal gland; right adrenal cortex; gastrocnemius muscle / Top expressed in: spermatocyte; spermatid; muscle of thigh; tail of embryo; genital tubercle; yolk sac; dentate gyrus of hippocampal formation granule cell; superior frontal gyrus; lip; blastocyst; More reference expression data
BioGPS	More reference expression data
Gene ontology
Molecular function	protein binding
Cellular component	COP9 signalosome; nucleus; nucleoplasm; cytoplasm; cytosol
Biological process	transcription-coupled nucleotide-excision repair; nucleotide-excision repair, DNA damage recognition; protein deneddylation; post-translational protein modification; viral process; COP9 signalosome assembly
Sources:Amigo / QuickGO
Orthologs
Databases	NCBI: entry; OMA: entry
Species	Human	Mouse
Entrez	50813	26894
Ensembl	ENSG00000111652	ENSMUSG00000030127
UniProt	Q9UBW8	Q9CZ04
RefSeq (mRNA)	NM_001164093; NM_001164094; NM_001164095; NM_016319	NM_001164089; NM_012003; NM_001355541; NM_001355542; NM_001379119 NM_001379120; NM_001379122; NM_001379123; NM_001379124; NM_001379125
RefSeq (protein)	NP_001157565; NP_001157566; NP_001157567; NP_057403	NP_001157561; NP_036133; NP_001342470; NP_001342471; NP_001366048 NP_001366049; NP_001366051; NP_001366052; NP_001366053; NP_001366054
Location (UCSC)	Chr 12: 6.72 – 6.73 Mb	Chr 6: 124.94 – 124.94 Mb
PubMed search
- Wikidata
View/Edit Human	View/Edit Mouse

COP9 signalosome complex subunit 7a is a protein that in humans is encoded by the COPS7A gene.
