= COPS7B =

Protein-coding gene in humans

Identifiers
- Aliases: COPS7B, CSN7B, SGN7b, COP9 signalosome subunit 7B
- External IDs: OMIM: 616010; MGI: 1349388; GeneCards: COPS7B

Gene location (Human)
Chr.	Chromosome 2 (human)
Band	2q37.1	Start	231,781,671 bp
Band	2q37.1	End	231,809,254 bp
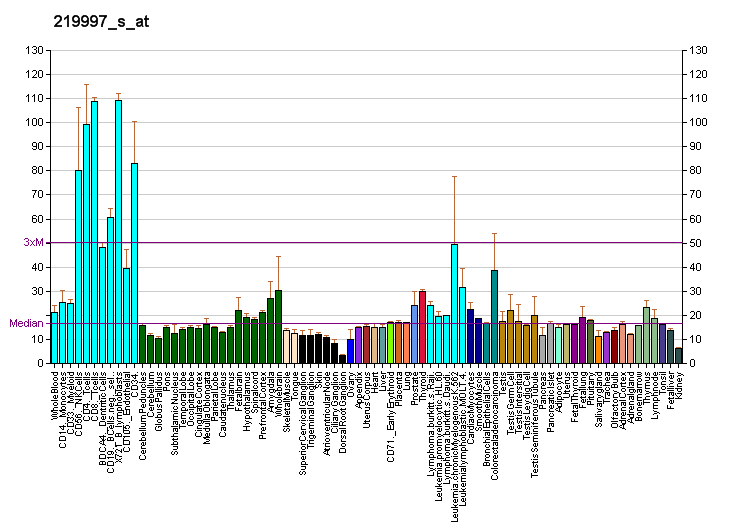
RNA expression pattern
Bgee	Human / Mouse (ortholog); Top expressed in: right uterine tube; right testis; left testis; body of uterus; anterior pituitary; right adrenal cortex; apex of heart; canal of the cervix; left adrenal gland; stromal cell of endometrium / n/a; More reference expression data
BioGPS	More reference expression data
Gene ontology
Molecular function	protein binding
Cellular component	cytoplasm; COP9 signalosome; nucleus; nucleoplasm; cytosol
Biological process	transcription-coupled nucleotide-excision repair; nucleotide-excision repair, DNA damage recognition; protein deneddylation; post-translational protein modification; viral process; COP9 signalosome assembly
Sources:Amigo / QuickGO
Orthologs
Databases	NCBI: entry; OMA: entry
Species	Human	Mouse
Entrez	64708	26895
Ensembl	ENSG00000144524	n/a
UniProt	Q9H9Q2	Q8BV13
RefSeq (mRNA)	NM_001282949; NM_001282950; NM_001282951; NM_001282952; NM_001308381 NM_022730; NM_001369483	NM_172974; NM_001360887; NM_001360888
RefSeq (protein)	NP_001269878; NP_001269879; NP_001269880; NP_001269881; NP_001295310 NP_073567; NP_001356412	NP_766562; NP_001347816; NP_001347817
Location (UCSC)	Chr 2: 231.78 – 231.81 Mb	n/a
PubMed search
- Wikidata
View/Edit Human	View/Edit Mouse

COP9 signalosome complex subunit 7b is a protein that in humans is encoded by the COPS7B gene.
