= WH2 motif =

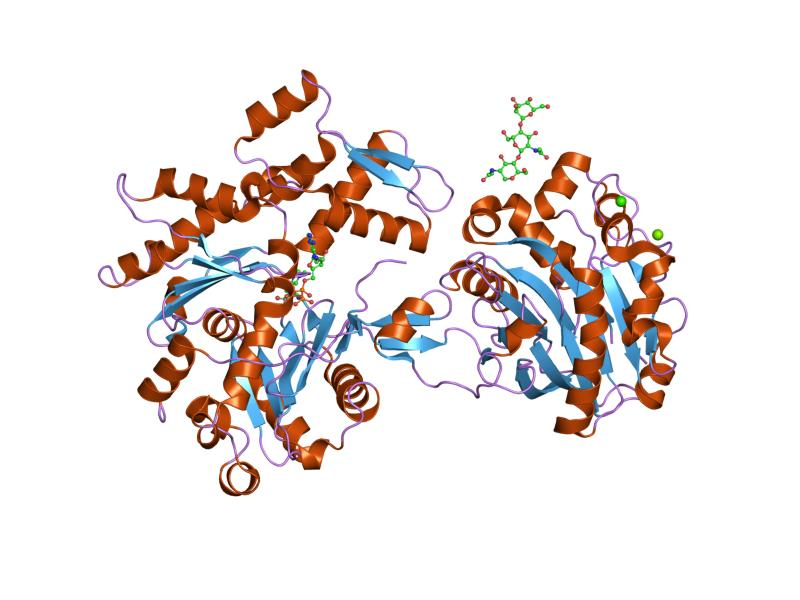
- Ternary complex of the WH2 domain of mim with actin-dnase I

Identifiers
- Symbol: WH2
- Pfam: PF02205
- InterPro: IPR003124
- SMART: WH2
- SCOP2: 1ej5 / SCOPe / SUPFAM
Available protein structures:
- PDB: IPR003124 PF02205 (ECOD; PDBsum)
- AlphaFold: IPR003124; PF02205

== Function ==
The WH2 motif or WH2 domain is an evolutionarily conserved sequence motif contained in proteins. It is found in WASP proteins which control actin polymerisation, therefore, WH2 is important in cellular processes such as cell contractility, cell motility, cell trafficking and cell signalling.

== Motif ==
The WH2 motif (for Wiskott–Aldrich syndrome homology region 2) has been shown in WAS and Scar1/WASF1 (mammalian homologue) to interact via their WH2 motifs with actin.

The WH2 (WASP-Homology 2, or Wiskott–Aldrich homology 2) domain is an ~18 amino acids actin-binding motif. This domain was first recognized as an essential element for the regulation of the cytoskeleton by the mammalian Wiskott–Aldrich syndrome protein (WASP) family. WH2 proteins occur in eukaryotes from yeast to mammals, in insect viruses, and in some bacteria. The WH2 domain is found as a modular part of larger proteins; it can be associated with the WH1 or EVH1 domain and with the CRIB domain, and the WH2 domain can occur as a tandem repeat. The WH2 domain binds to actin monomers and can facilitate the assembly of actin monomers into actin filaments.

== Examples ==
Human genes encoding proteins containing the WH2 motif include:

- COBL, COBLL1, ESPN, INF2, JMY
- LMOD1, LMOD2, LMOD3
- MTSS1, PXK
- WAS, WASF1, WASF2, WASF3, WASF4, WASL, WASPIP, WHDC1, WIPF1, WIPF2
