= IMD domain =

IRSp53/MIM homology domain
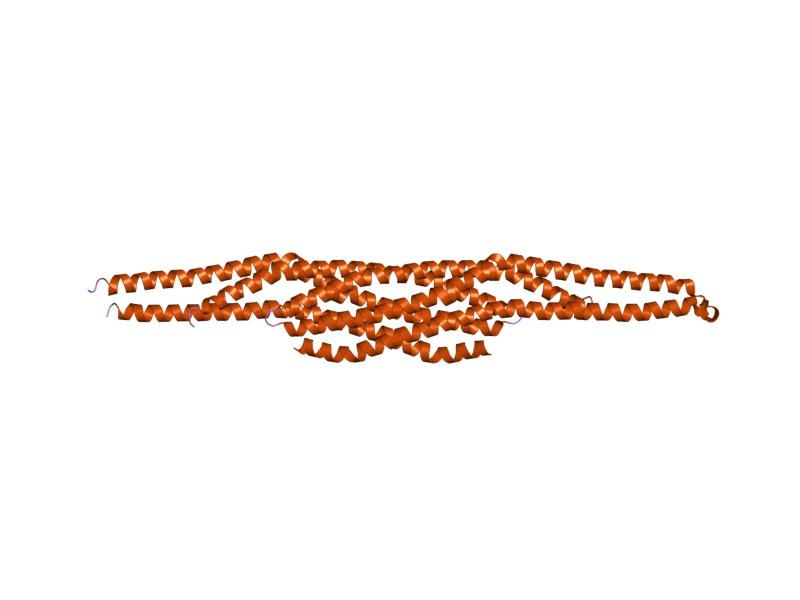
- crystal structure of rcb domain of irsp53

Identifiers
- Symbol: IMD
- Pfam: PF08397
- Pfam clan: CL0145
- InterPro: IPR013606
Available protein structures:
- PDB: IPR013606 PF08397 (ECOD; PDBsum)
- AlphaFold: IPR013606; PF08397

In molecular biology, the IMD domain (IRSp53 and MIM (missing in metastases) homology Domain) or I-BAR domain (Inverse BAR domain) is a BAR-like domain of approximately 250 amino acids found at the N-terminus in the insulin receptor tyrosine kinase substrate p53 (IRSp53/BAIAP2) and in the evolutionarily related IRSp53/MIM (MTSS1) family. In IRSp53, a ubiquitous regulator of the actin cytoskeleton, the IMD domain acts as conserved F-actin bundling domain involved in filopodium formation. Filopodium-inducing IMD activity is regulated by Cdc42 and Rac1 (Rho-family GTPases) and is SH3-independent, and dependent on the membrane binding and deforming activity.

== Family members ==
The IRSp53/MIM family is a membrane deforming and novel F-actin bundling protein family that includes invertebrate relatives:

- Vertebrate MIM (missing in metastasis) (MTSS1), an actin-binding scaffold protein that may be involved in cancer metastasis.
- Vertebrate ABBA-1 (MTSS1L), a MIM-related protein.
- Vertebrate brain-specific angiogenesis inhibitor 1-associated protein 2 (BAI1-associated protein 2) or insulin receptor tyrosine kinase substrate p53 (IRSp53), a multifunctional adaptor protein that links Rac1 with a Wiskott–Aldrich syndrome family verprolin-homologous protein 2 (WAVE2/WASF2) to induce lamellipodia or Cdc42 with Mena to induce filopodia.
- Vertebrate brain-specific angiogenesis inhibitor 1-associated protein 2-like proteins 1 and 2 (BAI1-associated protein 2-like proteins 1 and 2, BAIAP2L1 and BAIAP2L2).
- Drosophila melanogaster (Fruit fly) CG32082-PA.
- Caenorhabditis elegans M04F3.5 protein.

== Subgroups ==
The vertebrate IRSp53/MIM family is divided into two major groups: the IRSp53 subfamily and the MIM/ABBA subfamily. The putative invertebrate homologues are positioned between them. The IRSp53 subfamily members contain an SH3 domain, and the MIM/ABBA subfamily proteins contain a WH2 (WASP-homology 2) domain. The vertebrate SH3-containing subfamily is further divided into three groups according to the presence or absence of the WWB and the half-CRIB motif. The IMD domain can bind to and bundle actin filaments, bind to membranes and interact with the small GTPase Rac.

== Structure ==
The IMD domain folds as a coiled coil of three extended alpha-helices and a shorter C-terminal helix. Helix 4 packs tightly against the other three helices, and thus represents an integral part of the domain. The fold of the IMD domain closely resembles that of the BAR (Bin-Amphiphysin-RVS) domain, a functional module serving both as a sensor and inducer of membrane curvature that is compatible for plasma membrane protrusions including filopodia and spines. The IMD domain is also known as the I-BAR domain because of its inverse curvature of the membrane binding surface compared to that of the BAR domain. The WH2 domain performs a scaffolding function.
