= Formins =

Protein family

Formin Homology Region 1

Identifiers
- Symbol: Drf_FH1
- Pfam: PF06346
- InterPro: IPR009408
Available protein structures:
- PDB: IPR009408 PF06346 (ECOD; PDBsum)
- AlphaFold: IPR009408; PF06346

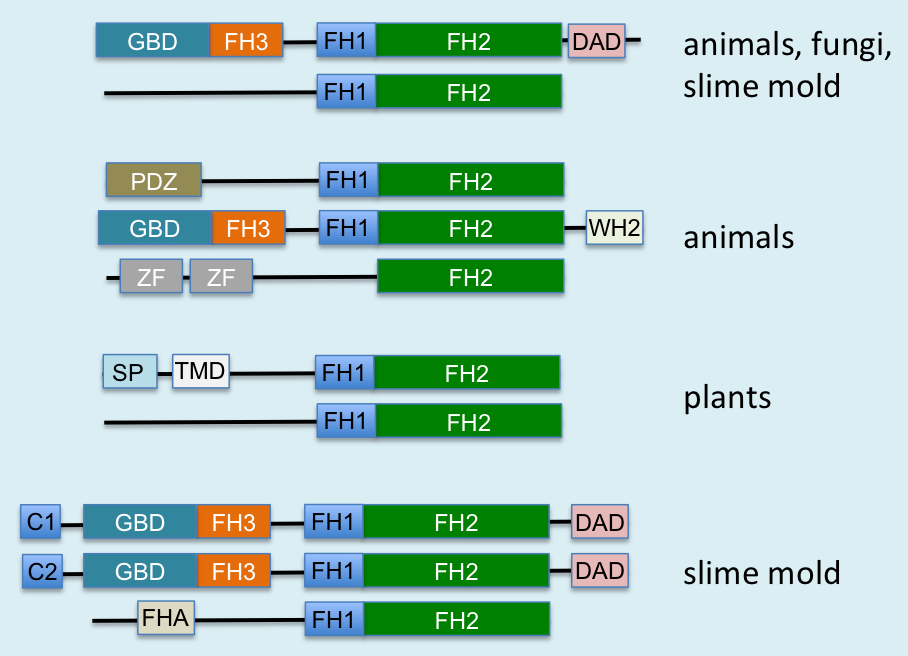
Domain structure of formin proteins across phyla.

Formin Homology 2 Domain
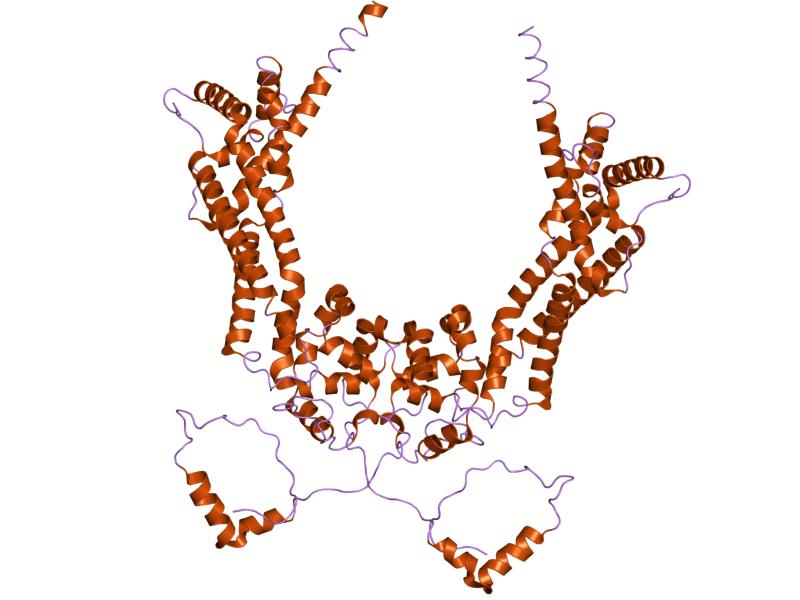
- crystal structures of a formin homology-2 domain reveal a tethered-dimer architecture

Identifiers
- Symbol: FH2
- Pfam: PF02181
- InterPro: IPR015425
- SMART: FH2
- SCOP2: 1ux5 / SCOPe / SUPFAM
Available protein structures:
- PDB: IPR015425 PF02181 (ECOD; PDBsum)
- AlphaFold: IPR015425; PF02181

Diaphanous FH3 Domain
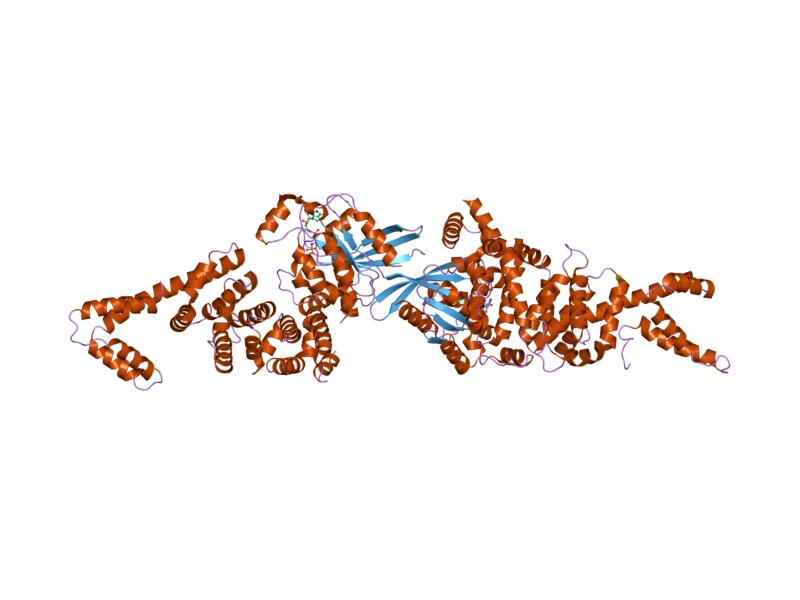
- crystal structure of mdia1 gbd-fh3 in complex with rhoc-gmppnp

Identifiers
- Symbol: Drf_FH3
- Pfam: PF06367
- Pfam clan: CL0020
- InterPro: IPR010472
Available protein structures:
- PDB: IPR010472 PF06367 (ECOD; PDBsum)
- AlphaFold: IPR010472; PF06367

DRF Autoregulatory Domain
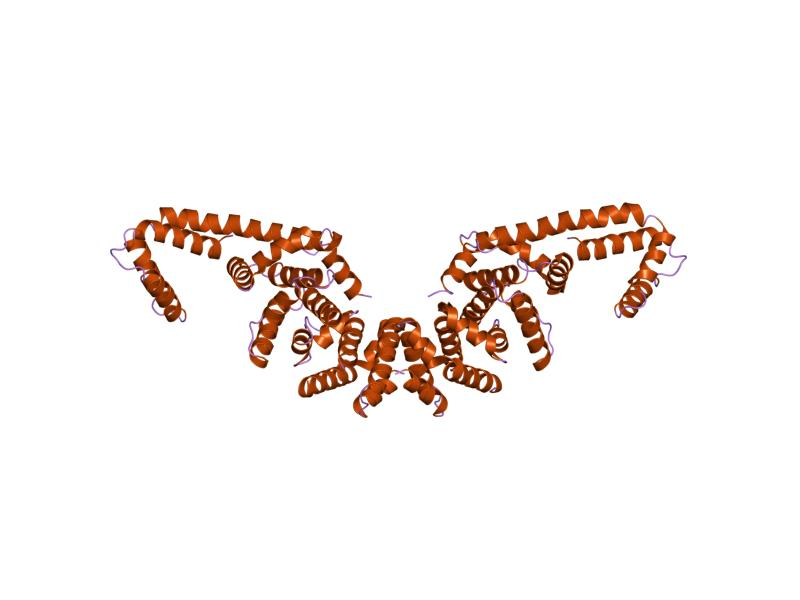
- crystal structure of the n-terminal mdia1 armadillo repeat region and dimerisation domain in complex with the mdia1 autoregulatory domain (dad)

Identifiers
- Symbol: Drf_DAD
- Pfam: PF06345
- InterPro: IPR010465
Available protein structures:
- PDB: IPR010465 PF06345 (ECOD; PDBsum)
- AlphaFold: IPR010465; PF06345

Diaphanous GTPase-binding Domain
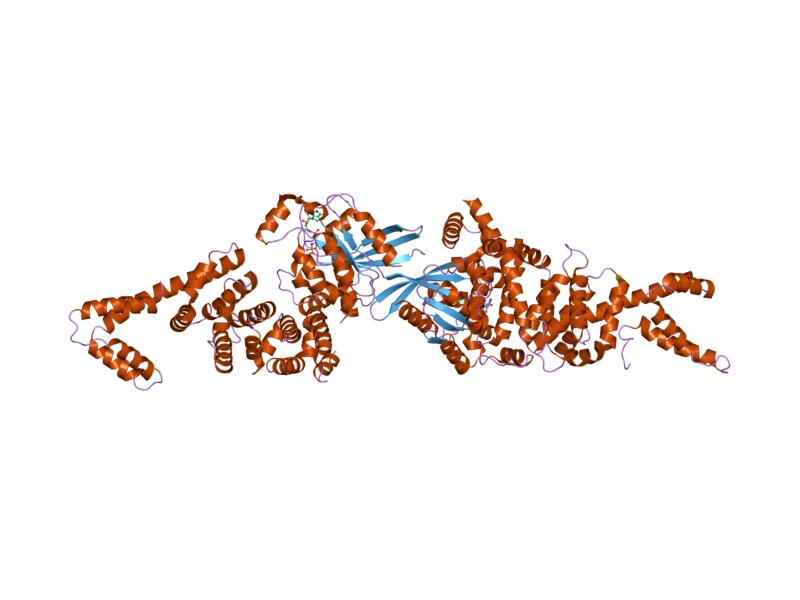
- crystal structure of mdia1 gbd-fh3 in complex with rhoc-gmppnp

Identifiers
- Symbol: Drf_GBD
- Pfam: PF06371
- Pfam clan: CL0020
- InterPro: IPR010473
Available protein structures:
- PDB: IPR010473 PF06371 (ECOD; PDBsum)
- AlphaFold: IPR010473; PF06371

Formins (formin homology proteins) are a group of proteins that are involved in the polymerization of actin and associate with the fast-growing end (barbed end) of actin filaments. Most formins are Rho-GTPase effector proteins. Formins regulate the actin and microtubule cytoskeleton and are involved in various cellular functions such as cell polarity, cytokinesis, cell migration and SRF transcriptional activity. Formins are multidomain proteins that interact with diverse signalling molecules and cytoskeletal proteins, although some formins have been assigned functions within the nucleus.

== Diversity ==
Formins have been found in all eukaryotes studied. In humans, the formin homology family is composed of 15 different proteins, including Formin 1, and 2, Formin-like 1, 2, and 3, and a number of others classified into 7 subgroups. By contrast, yeasts contain only 2-3 formins.

== Structure and interactions ==
Formins are characterized by the presence of three formin homology (FH) domains (FH1, FH2 and FH3), although members of the formin family do not necessarily contain all three domains. In addition, other domains are usually present, such as PDZ, DAD, WH2, or FHA domains.

The proline-rich FH1 domain mediates interactions with a variety of proteins, including the actin-binding protein profilin, SH3 (Src homology 3) domain proteins, and WW domain proteins. The actin nucleation-promoting activity of S. cerevisiae formins has been localized to the FH2 domain. The FH2 domain is required for the self-association of formin proteins through the ability of FH2 domains to directly bind each other, and may also act to inhibit actin polymerization. The FH3 domain is less well conserved and is required for directing formins to the correct intracellular location, such as the mitotic spindle, or the projection tip during cellular conjugation. In addition, some formins can contain a GTPase-binding domain (GBD) required for binding to Rho small GTPases, and a C-terminal conserved Dia-autoregulatory domain (DAD). The GBD is a bifunctional autoinhibitory domain that interacts with and is regulated by activated Rho family members. Mammalian Drf3 contains a CRIB-like motif within its GBD for binding to Cdc42, which is required for Cdc42 to activate and guide Drf3 towards the cell cortex where it remodels the actin skeleton. The DAD binds the N-terminal GBD; this link is broken when GTP-bound Rho binds to the GBD and activates the protein. The addition of the DAD to mammalian cells induces actin filament formation, stabilizes microtubules, and activates SRF mediated transcription. Another commonly found domain is an armadillo repeat region (ARR) located in the FH3 domain.

The FH2 domain, has been shown by X-ray crystallography to have an elongated, crescent shape containing three helical subdomains.

Formins also directly bind to microtubules via their FH2 domain. This interaction is important in promoting the capture and stabilization of a subset of microtubules oriented towards the leading edge of migrating cells. Formins also promote the capture of microtubules by the kinetochore during mitosis and for aligning microtubules along actin filaments.

== Cappuccino subfamily ==
Formin-1

Identifiers
- Symbol: FMN1
- Alt. symbols: LD, FMN
- NCBI gene: 342184
- HGNC: 3768
- OMIM: 136535
- RefSeq: NM_001103184
- UniProt: Q68DA7

Other data
- Locus: Chr. 15 q13-q14
Search for
- Structures: Swiss-model
- Domains: InterPro

Formin-2

Identifiers
- Symbol: FMN2
- NCBI gene: 56776
- HGNC: 14074
- OMIM: 606373
- RefSeq: NM_020066
- UniProt: Q9NZ56

Other data
- Locus: Chr. 1 q43
Search for
- Structures: Swiss-model
- Domains: InterPro

The cappuccino subfamily includes of the namesake human proteins, formin-1 and formin-2, along with the cappuccino protein found in fruit flies.

=== Formin-1 ===
Formin-1 is a protein that in humans is encoded by the gene FMN1. Formin-1 is involved in cellular organization. In particular, it plays a role in the formation of adherens junctions between cells, and the joining of linear actin cables to form polymers.

=== Formin-2 ===
Formin-2 is a protein that in humans is encoded by the gene FMN2. This protein binds to actin and is involved in the assembly and reorganization of the actin cytoskeleton.

== See also ==
- Formin-2
