= Cordon-bleu protein =

Protein found in humans

COBL

Identifiers
- Aliases: COBL, cordon-bleu WH2 repeat protein
- External IDs: OMIM: 610317; MGI: 105056; GeneCards: COBL
Available structures
PDB	Ortholog search: PDBe RCSB
PDB	List of PDB id codes 4PL8

Gene location (Human)
Chr.	Chromosome 7 (human)
Band	7p12.1	Start	51,016,212 bp
Band	7p12.1	End	51,316,818 bp

Gene location (Mouse)
Chr.	Chromosome 11 (mouse)
Band	11 A1|11 7.3 cM	Start	12,186,608 bp
Band	11 A1|11 7.3 cM	End	12,414,960 bp
RNA expression pattern
Bgee	Human / Mouse (ortholog); Top expressed in: inferior ganglion of vagus nerve; parotid gland; external globus pallidus; Brodmann area 46; gastrocnemius muscle; middle frontal gyrus; postcentral gyrus; orbitofrontal cortex; muscle of thigh; pars reticulata / Top expressed in: muscle of thigh; esophagus; temporal muscle; knee joint; vastus lateralis muscle; sternocleidomastoid muscle; triceps brachii muscle; ankle; medial head of gastrocnemius muscle; skeletal muscle tissue; More reference expression data
BioGPS	n/a
Gene ontology
Molecular function	actin monomer binding; actin binding
Cellular component	cytoplasm; dendritic growth cone; cell projection; membrane; ruffle; plasma membrane; axonal growth cone; axon; soma; dendrite; cell cortex; actin filament; perinuclear region of cytoplasm; cytoskeleton
Biological process	positive regulation of ruffle assembly; somite specification; actin filament network formation; notochord development; embryonic axis specification; positive regulation of dendrite development; floor plate development; actin filament polymerization; neural tube closure; collateral sprouting in absence of injury; liver development; digestive tract development
Sources:Amigo / QuickGO
Orthologs
Databases	NCBI: entry; OMA: entry
Species	Human	Mouse
Entrez	23242	12808
Ensembl	ENSG00000106078	ENSMUSG00000020173
UniProt	O75128	Q5NBX1
RefSeq (mRNA)	NM_001287436; NM_001287438; NM_015198; NM_001346441; NM_001346442 NM_001346443; NM_001346444	NM_001282993; NM_001282994; NM_172496; NM_001401095; NM_001401096 NM_001401097; NM_001401098; NM_001401099; NM_001401100
RefSeq (protein)	NP_001274365; NP_001274367; NP_001333370; NP_001333371; NP_001333372 NP_001333373; NP_056013	NP_001269922; NP_001269923; NP_766084; NP_001388024; NP_001388025 NP_001388026; NP_001388027; NP_001388028; NP_001388029
Location (UCSC)	Chr 7: 51.02 – 51.32 Mb	Chr 11: 12.19 – 12.41 Mb
PubMed search
- Wikidata
View/Edit Human	View/Edit Mouse

Protein cordon-bleu is a protein that in humans is encoded by the COBL gene. Cordon-bleu Plays a role in the reorganization of the actin cytoskeleton. It regulates neuron morphogenesis and increases branching of axons and dendrites.

== Discovery ==
The Cordon-bleu protein was first described in 2007. Cobl was demonstrated to be a brain-enriched, Wiskott-Aldrich Homology 2 WH2 domain–based actin nucleator playing a pivotal role in morphogenetic processes in the vertebrate central nervous system (CNS) that give rise to the complex dendritic arbor of neuronal cells.

The Cobl gene was originally identified in lacZ-gene-trap experiments in mice. Cobl mRNA was detected as early as at day 7.5 post-coitum (E7.5) in the gastrula organizer and extended towards the axial midline at E8. The organizer is a small group of embryonal cells that organizes the entire body plan because it gives rise to the axial midline – an important source of patterning and morphogenesis cues.

Cobl was discovered as an actin nucleator in F-actin formation assays with brain cytosol depleted for the Arp2/3 complex (the only other actin nucleator known at this time) and with beads coated with the SH3 domain of the actin binding protein 1 (Abp1) [[Abp1|mAbp1|SH3P7|HIP-55|drebin-like]] and with the SH3 domain of syndapin I, respectively, and subsequent yeast-two hybrid screen for putatively responsible components using a brain cDNA library. Cobl was then cloned fully and its neuronal functions were characterized in primary neuronal cultures in functional slices of the cerebellum, at the animal level in zebra fish, and in mice.

The WH2 domain-based actin nucleator Cobl turned out to be critical for the induction of dendritic branches in both hippocampal neurons and Purkinje cells of the cerebellum, as revealed by RNAi experiments. Cobl hereby specifically accumulates at nascent dendritic branch sites prior to a burst of local F-actin formation at these sites.

== Gene ==
The human COBL gene encodes a 1261-amino acid protein with a mass of about 136 kDa. The mouse protein is 1337 amino acids long. The cobl gene in mice and human gives rise to a variety of putative splice variants, which, however, have not yet been analyzed at the protein level. Cobl genes seem to be restricted to vertebrates.

== Structure ==
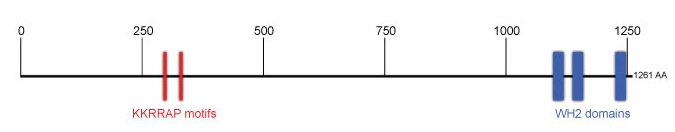
Motifs and domains in Cordon-bleu protein.

Cobl gives rise to actin filaments by bringing together three actin monomers by the use of its three C-terminal WH2 domains, as shown by in vitro reconstitutions with the purified C-terminus of Cobl. In addition to the three C-terminal WH2 domains, the presence of the linker region L2 between the second and third WH2 domain was also of importance for Cobl-mediated actin nucleation. Cobl assembles non-bundled, unbranched actin filaments.

An important functional part of this actin-nucleating protein is the C-terminus, which contains 3 Wiskott-Aldrich syndrome protein (WASp) homology 2 (WH2) domains. WH2 domains are able to associate with actin monomers to funnel them into actin filament formation processes. Cobl in humans contains three WH2 domains located at the C-terminus (the first WH2 domain, WH2.1, lies between 1109 and 1129, WH2.2 between 1149 and 1169 and WH2.3 between 1237 and 1257), that are responsible for forming an "actin nucleus" composed of 3 actin monomers from which an actin filament can be further elongated. The cobl-actin-nucleus is thought to remain at the pointed end of the emerging filament leaving the barbed end free for rapid polymerization. Other critical functional parts are the N-terminal Cobl Homology domain, which can also be found in the ancestor of Cobl, Cobl-like - a protein that is also expressed highly in the nervous system and able to give rise to actin filaments by a mechanism different to Cobl, yet, using in part similar associated components and molecular mechanisms. Cobl Homology domains contain three motifs following the consensus KrRAPpPP (first described as "KRAP" motif of unknown function by Caroll et al., 2003), which represent syndapin I binding sites The polypeptide also contains several further proline-rich sequences, which e.g. bind the SH3 domain of Abp1 and PRMT2. Also binding sites for profilin-actin heterodimers have been suggested, selected Ser residues are phosphorylated and two Arginines in the second WH2 domain, which is considered the pace maker of the actin nucleation process were detected to be methylated. In humans there are 5 isoforms of Cobl generated though alternative splicing.

=== WH2 domain ===
The WH2 domain is an ~18-21 amino acids actin-binding motif. This domain was first recognized as an essential element for the regulation of the cytoskeleton by the mammalian Wiskott-Aldrich syndrome protein (WASp) and is present in at least 6 classes of proteins WIP/Verprolin, Cibulot, Svv2/CAP, β-Thymosines, WAVE/Scar. WH2 proteins occur in eukaryotes from yeast to mammals, in insect viruses, and in some bacteria. The WH2 domain is found as a modular part of larger proteins and can occur as a tandem repeat. The WH2 domain binds actin monomers and can facilitate the assembly of actin monomers into newly forming actin filaments.

== Function ==
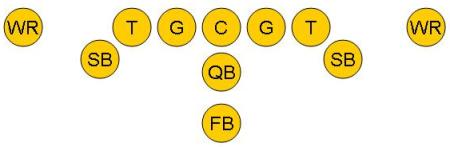
Working model of Cobl-induced actin nucleation.

Cobl is responsible for the actin polymerization of filaments with fast-growing barbed ends. Cobl stabilizes a longitudinal actin-GTP dimer by two consecutive WH2 domains and it can interact laterally with another actin monomer to form an actin trimer. Rearrangements of the actin–actin contacts have to occur within this trimer to make a helical nucleus; the third WH2 domain of Cobl has been proposed to interact with the third actin subunit of this trimer. This Cobl-actin tetramer is forming a nucleus to facilitate further G-actin addition. Cobl-mediated actin nucleation is very efficient. In fact already low nanomolar concentrations of Cobl can generate unbranched filaments with similar characteristics as WASp–Arp2/3-complex-mediated actin nucleation. Like Spire-1, The expression of Cobl is mainly restricted to the brain; much weaker expression was detected in other tissues. In neurons, Cobl can be found to be enriched at axonal and dendritic growth cones and at dendritic branch induction sites. Cobl The role of Cobl in neural morphogenesis has been investigated ex vivo in hippocampal neurons in rat-brain and in cerebellar slice cultures using a gene gun approach. Overexpression leads to a strong increase in dendrite formation and branching, whereas RNAi-mediated Cobl depletion results in a reduction of dendrites and of dendritic branching. Critical roles of Cobl have also been suggested for microvilli formation of colon cells (Grega-Larson et al.,) and in the organization of sensory systems. For further details see section "Cobl deficiencies in different animal systems" below.

== Regulation ==
In contrast to other actin nucleators, which are directly or indirectly via their activators controlled by Rho type GTPases, Cobl hereby is controlled by calcium/calmodulin signalling and by arginine methylation brought about by the arginine methyltransferase 2 PRMT2. Consistently, both CaM inhibitors and inhibitors of arginine methylation fully suppressed Cobl-induced dendritic branch induction. Furthermore, Cobl mutants lacking the PRMT2 binding site or lacking CaM-binding regions failed to power dendritic branching. The molecular mechanisms, by which Ca2+ signals control the actin nucleator Cobl, are quite complex and may reflect a high level of fine-tuning Cobl's physiological functions to Ca2+ transients in neuronal cells. Cobl is regulated by Ca2+ signals in at least three distinct ways (Izadi and Hou et al., 2018). These modes involve all three WH2 domains of Cobl, which closely need to work together to nucleate actin effectively. Interestingly, Ca2+/CaM controls not only the actin cytoskeletal aspects of Cobl functions but also its targeting to the plasma membrane - a prerequisite for F-actin-driven force generation shaping the morphology of cells. Mutational analyses showed that both individual CaM-dependent regulatory mechanisms are crucial for Cobl-mediated dendritogenesis. The required recruitment of Cobl to the dendritic plasma membrane is brought about by Cobl's own ability to associate with membrane lipids and by the membrane-binding protein syndapin I, which is critical for Cobl's membrane targeting and function.

== Comparison with spire and arp2/3 complex ==
Several actin nucleators are present in mammalian cells. Cobl, Spire and Leiomodin form one group of such proteins because of their molecular mechanisms of actin nucleation all critically require their WH2 domain(s) - a common motif found in all of these nucleators. Other protein containing WH2 domain have other functions. And other nucleators, such as formins, nucleate actin filaments using a different actin-binding motif, e.g. the FH2 (formin homology 2) domain.

Cordon-bleu protein, uses two WH2 motifs (blue segment) for the recruitment of ATP-actin monomers (dark orange) to form a linear actin dimer (Fig. 3). A short linker (short green segment) permits a close association between the linearly arranged actin subunits; a longer linker (long green segment) permits a third ATP-actin monomer to bind to the most carboxy-terminal WH2 motif to assemble in a cross-filament orientation, creating a trimeric actin nucleus.

In contrast, Spire, which contains four closely spaced WH2s, is proposed to nucleate actin filaments by stabilizing the association of four actin monomers along a single, linear strand. Additional four ATP-actin monomers associate laterally along this tetramer to form a short typical two-strand helical actin filament (cf. Fig. 2C).

In the case of the WASp-Arp2/3-complex, WASp (yellow segment, Fig. 3) binds to and activates the Arp2/3 complex (purple structures, the nucleator complex) by orienting the two ARP subunits in a conformation similar to the barbed end of an actin filament. The WH2 motif in WASp recruits ATP-G-actin that binds to either Arp2 or Arp3 to complete the formation of a trimeric actin nucleus.

== Diseases ==
Recent reports don't give a significant insight on a pivotal clinical role of Cobl. Due to its role in vertebrate neural morphogenesis we can speculate that some neurodegenative disorders may be a consequence of a mutated or less functional Cobl. Cobl seems to play a role in the skeletal asymmetry of the Silver-Russel syndrome; the disease is caused by the duplication of the p11.2-p13 segment of the chromosome 7. Screening studies on patients having neurological disorders didn't report until now (June 2009) a specific involvement of Cobl.

== Cobl deficiencies in different animal systems ==
The cobl gene was originally identified in lacZ-gene-trap experiments. Cobl mRNA was detected as early as at day 7.5 post-coitum (E7.5) in the gastrula organizer and extended towards the axial midline at E8. The organizer is a small group of embryonal cells that organizes the entire body plan because it gives rise to the axial midline – an important source of patterning and morphogenesis cues. The striking accumulation and restriction of Cobl mRNA to the organizer and axial midline structures led to the idea that Cobl is involved in vertebrate axis formation. Unfortunately, the CoblC101 allele obtained by the genetrap experiments is only a weakly hypomorphic allele (Caroll et al., 2003) and mice homozygous for the CoblC101 gene-trap allele did not show any obvious phenotype. A genetic interaction with Vangl2 suggested that Cobl has some role in midbrain neural tube closure (Caroll et al., 2003). Cobl knockout mice were viable and showed no obvious defects in neural tube closure and/or body laterality. Instead, Cobl knock out mice were reported to show defects in the inner ear suggesting a role of Cobl in postnatal planar cell polarity refinements and in the organization of the sensory structures in the cochlea. In line, Cobl KO mice showed defects in cochlear amplification. Zebra fish deficient for Cobl showed severe defects in body laterality and balance keeping.
