= FMNL3 =

Protein-coding gene in humans

Identifiers
- Aliases: FMNL3, FHOD3, WBP-3, WBP3, FRL2, formin like 3
- External IDs: OMIM: 616288; MGI: 109569; GeneCards: FMNL3
Available structures
PDB	Ortholog search: PDBe RCSB
PDB	List of PDB id codes 4EAH

Gene location (Human)
Chr.	Chromosome 12 (human)
Band	12q13.12	Start	49,636,499 bp
Band	12q13.12	End	49,708,165 bp

Gene location (Mouse)
Chr.	Chromosome 15 (mouse)
Band	15|15 F1	Start	99,215,106 bp
Band	15|15 F1	End	99,268,363 bp
RNA expression pattern
Bgee	Human / Mouse (ortholog); Top expressed in: sural nerve; appendix; right coronary artery; stromal cell of endometrium; lymph node; Achilles tendon; apex of heart; granulocyte; left coronary artery; right lung / Top expressed in: primary oocyte; granulocyte; calvaria; internal carotid artery; external carotid artery; secondary oocyte; zygote; endocardial cushion; semi-lunar valve; ankle; More reference expression data
BioGPS	n/a
Gene ontology
Molecular function	GTPase activating protein binding; actin binding
Cellular component	cytoplasm; membrane; Golgi apparatus; cytosol; plasma membrane; intracellular membrane-bounded organelle
Biological process	multicellular organism development; actin cytoskeleton organization; angiogenesis; cellular component organization; cytoskeleton organization; regulation of cell shape; cell migration; cortical actin cytoskeleton organization
Sources:Amigo / QuickGO
Orthologs
Databases	NCBI: entry; OMA: entry
Species	Human	Mouse
Entrez	91010	22379
Ensembl	ENSG00000161791	ENSMUSG00000023008
UniProt	Q8IVF7	Q6ZPF4
RefSeq (mRNA)	NM_175736; NM_198900; NM_001367835	NM_011711; NM_001310622; NM_001310623
RefSeq (protein)	NP_783863; NP_944489; NP_001354764	NP_001297551; NP_001297552; NP_035841
Location (UCSC)	Chr 12: 49.64 – 49.71 Mb	Chr 15: 99.22 – 99.27 Mb
PubMed search
- Wikidata
View/Edit Human	View/Edit Mouse

Formin-like protein 3 (FMNL3), also known as WW domain-binding protein 3 (WBP-3), is a protein that in humans is encoded by the FMNL3 gene.

== Function ==
The protein encoded by this gene contains a formin homology 2 domain and has high sequence identity to the mouse Wbp3 protein. Two alternative transcripts encoding different isoforms have been described. The C-terminus has been shown to accelerate actin polymerization activity of this protein through its WH2-like motif. FMNL3 has been crystallized in complex with actin providing insight into the mechanism of formin-mediated actin nucleation.

== See also ==
- FMNL1
- FMNL2
