= Trans-Golgi network vesicle protein 23 A =

Mammalian protein found in Homo sapiens

TVP23A

Identifiers
- Aliases: TVP23A, FAM18A, YDR084C, trans-golgi network vesicle protein 23 homolog A
- External IDs: MGI: 3665441; GeneCards: TVP23A

Gene location (Human)
Chr.	Chromosome 16 (human)
Band	16p13.13	Start	10,760,919 bp
Band	16p13.13	End	10,818,794 bp

Gene location (Mouse)
Chr.	Chromosome 16 (mouse)
Band	16|16 A1	Start	10,238,421 bp
Band	16|16 A1	End	10,265,226 bp
RNA expression pattern
Bgee	Human / Mouse (ortholog); Top expressed in: epithelium of colon; gonad; endothelial cell; ventricular zone; cingulate gyrus; anterior cingulate cortex; testicle; ganglionic eminence; right frontal lobe; prefrontal cortex / Top expressed in: facial motor nucleus; Rostral migratory stream; dentate gyrus of hippocampal formation granule cell; external carotid artery; ventricular zone; visual cortex; internal carotid artery; ganglionic eminence; primary visual cortex; superior cervical ganglion; More reference expression data
BioGPS	n/a
Orthologs
Databases	NCBI: entry; OMA: entry
Species	Human	Mouse
Entrez	780776	383103
Ensembl	ENSG00000166676	ENSMUSG00000050908
UniProt	A6NH52	n/a
RefSeq (mRNA)	NM_001079512; NM_001318873	NM_001013778; NM_001359069
RefSeq (protein)	NP_001072980; NP_001305802	n/a
Location (UCSC)	Chr 16: 10.76 – 10.82 Mb	Chr 16: 10.24 – 10.27 Mb
PubMed search
- Wikidata
View/Edit Human	View/Edit Mouse

Trans-Golgi network vesicle protein 23 A (TVP23A) is a protein coded for the TVP23A gene, formerly known as FAM18A. TVP23A is located on chromosome 16. It is known to have human paralogs, TVP23B and TVP23C, as well as orthologs in many different species, notably yeast, mice, and chickens. The general consensus on the TVP23A protein indicate that it has some function in the late Golgi apparatus and is involved in retrograde transport from endosomes back into the Golgi apparatus. The nature of this transport is still unknown.

== Gene ==
=== Locus ===
TVP23A is located at cytogenic band 16p13.13, on the negative strand of Chromosome 16.

Location of TVP23A on Chromosome 16 (red line)

=== Alternative names ===
TVP23A stands for Trans-Golgi network Vesicle Protein 23A TVP23A, is the current name for the protein. Aliases of TVP23A include FAM18A, and rarely YDR084C.

== mRNA ==
=== Isoforms ===
There are two known isoforms of TVP23A, variant one and variant two, with variant one being the more common variant in humans.

== Protein ==
=== Structure ===
TVP23A is a member of the pfam superfamily containing the domain of unknown function 846 (DUF846). TVP23A has a predicted molecular weight of 24.1 kilodaltons, an isoelectric point of 6.5, and relatively high amounts of tryptophan and phenylalanine. The secondary structure of TVP23A consists primarily of alpha helices composing 4 transmembrane domains. There is not much information on the tertiary structure of TVP23A or its homologs. iTASSER was used to generate a prediction for the folding pattern of TVP23A, which supports the presence of multiple helix structures.

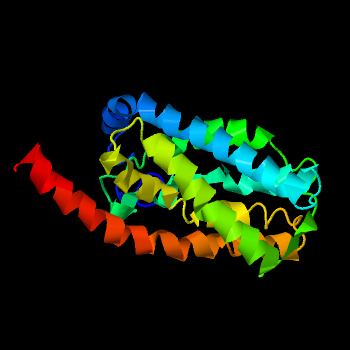
Protein structure of TVP23A as predicted by iTASSER

== Expression ==
TVP23A is ubiquitously expressed in all human tissues. There is evidence of higher expression in the brain tissue of mice. The promoter for TVP23A is GXP_91266, spanning 1403 base pairs located on the negative strand of chromosome 16.

== Function ==
The hypothesized function of TVP23A is a transmembrane protein involved in retrograde transport of vesicles from early endosomes into the late Golgi apparatus. TVP23A interactions with SNARE TVI1 were found to be required for retrograde transport.

== Interacting Proteins ==
TVP23A has been found to interact with four different proteins via Yeast two hybrid arrays. Two of these proteins, YIPF1 and YIPF2, are believed to be Golgi transport proteins.

Protein	Experiment	Function
SCAND1	Two hybrid array	Potentially a transcription factor (SCAN domains common in ZFP)
WIPF2	Two hybrid array	Believed to be involved in actin filament remodeling
YIPF1	Two hybrid array	Golgi transport protein
YIPF2	Two hybrid array	Golgi transport protein

== Homology ==
=== Homologous Domains ===
TVP23A is a DUF846 containing protein, which is homologous throughout TVP-type proteins. This domain contains the 4 transmembrane domains of TVP23A

=== Paralogs ===
TVP23A has two paralogs, TVP23B and TVP23C. TVP23B and TVP23C are 96% similar to each other, and both are located on chromosome 17. Due to the locations of these three genes, and their identities to each other, it is probable that ancestral TVP23 underwent duplication and translocation, giving rise to TVP23A on chromosome 16 and TVP23B/C on chromosome 17, which then underwent a second duplication to form TVP23B and TVP23C.

Gene	Seq Length	Seq Identity	Chromosome
TVP23A	213	100%	16
TVP23B	205	54%	17
TVP23C	203	53%	17

=== Orthologs ===
TVP23A has been found in all multicellular eukaryotes, including fungi. This gene has not been found in bacteria.

Genus and species	Common name	Order	Date of Divergence	NCBI Accession Number	Seq Length	Seq Identity
Homo sapiens	Human	Primate	0	NP_001072980	213	100%
Pan troglodytes	Chimp	Primate	6.4	XP_009428557.1	213	98%
Mus musculus	Mouse	Rodentia	88	NP_001013800.1	222	85%
Rattus norvegicus	Rat	Rodentia	88	NP_001101733.1	222	84%
Canis lupus familiaris	Dog	Carnivora	94	XP_547129.2	213	97%
Camelus ferus	Wild Bactian Camel	Ceratiodactyla	94	XP_006190640.1	213	92%
Bubalus bubalis	Water Buffalo	Ceratiodactyla	94	XP_006068214.1	213	93%
Miniopterus natalensis	Natal Long-fingered Bat	Chiroptera	96	XP_016053077.1	213	93%
Myotis brandtii	Brandt's Bat	Chiroptera	96	XP_005871809.1	213	93%
Condylura cristata	Star Nose Mole	Soricomorpha	96	XP_012587517.1	213	92%
Erinaceus Europaeus	European Hedgehog	Soricomorpha	96	XP_016047734.1	251	68%
Falco peregrinus	Peregrin Falcon	Aves	312	XP_005244242.1	204	64%
Gallus gallus	Chicken	Aves	320	XP_015150063.1	213	74%
Gekko japonicus	Schlegel's Japanese Gecko	Reptile	320	XP_015265390.1	210	75%
Thamnophis sirtalis	Garter Snake	Reptile	320	XP_013925075.1	308	30%
Rana catesbeiana	American Bullfrog	Amphibian	352	ACO51802.1	206	52%
Xenupus tropicalis	African Clawed Frog	Amphibian	353	XP_017953113.1	198	71%
Callorhinchus milii	Australian Ghostshark	Chimaeriformes	465	XP_007903081.1	206	70%
Rhizopus microsporus	Rhizopus	Fungi	1105	CEI91429.1	231	35%
Mortierella elongata	Mortierella	Fungi	1105	OAQ36303.1	218	35%
dictyostelium lacteum	Dictyostelium	Fungi	1480	KYQ94004.1	220	34%
