= Cordon Bleu =

Cordon bleu may refer to:

- the blue ribbon of the Order of the Holy Spirit
- the blue ribbon of the Order of St. Andrew, Russian Empire
- La Cuisinière Cordon Bleu, a 19th-century culinary magazine
- Le Cordon Bleu, international group of hospitality management and cooking schools teaching French cuisine
- Cordon bleu (dish), a dish of meat wrapped around cheese
- Cordon Bleu (album), by the Dutch rock group Solution
- Cordon-bleu protein, an actin nucleator protein
- Uraeginthus, a genus of birds in the family Estrildidae

== See also ==
- Cordon Bleugh!, an Angry Birds Toons episode
- Corbin Bleu, actor and singer
- Blue Riband (disambiguation)
- Blue ribbon (disambiguation)
- Blue Ribbon Award (disambiguation)
