= Middle-distance running =

Track races longer than sprints, up to 3200 m or 2 miles

Middle-distance running events are track races longer than sprints, ranging from 500 metres up to two miles (3,218.688 metres). The standard middle distances are the 800 metres, 1500 metres and mile run, although the 3000 metres may also be classified as a middle-distance event. The 1500 m came about as a result of running 3 3/4 laps of a 400 m outdoor track or 7 1/2 laps of a 200 m indoor track, which were commonplace in continental Europe in the 20th century.

Middle-distance running is unique in that it typically requires attributes found in both sprinters and long-distance runners, including combinations of both footspeed and aerobic endurance. Middle-distance racing is commonly reported to be a highly intense physical experience, requiring large amounts of anaerobic exertion from the body.

== Events ==
=== 500 metres ===
A very uncommon middle-distance event that is sometimes run by sprinters for muscle stamina training.

=== 600 yards ===
This was a popular distance, particularly indoors, when imperial distances were common. In the era of wooden 11-lap-to-a-mile tracks (common prior to metrication), this was one lap longer than a quarter-mile.

In 1882, American Lon Myers set what was then a world record at 600 yards (548.64 m), running it in 1:11.4.

The event was a common event for most American students because it was one of the standardized test events as part of the President's Award on Physical Fitness. In the late 1960s and early 1970s, Martin McGrady, who had minimal success at longer or shorter races, made his reputation, set world records and drew many fans to arenas to watch him race elite competitors, including Olympians, at this unusual distance.

=== 600 metres ===
This middle-distance length is rather uncommon and is mainly run by sprinters wishing to test their endurance at a longer distance. Like other middle-distance races, it evolved from the 600 yard race. The 600 m is also used as an early season stepping stone by 800 m runners before they have reached full race fitness.

Johnny Gray (United States) holds the record for men: 1:12.81 set at Santa Monica on 24 May 1986.

Caster Semenya (South Africa) holds the women's record: 1:21.77 set at Berlin on 27 August 2017.

=== 800 metres ===
The 800 m consists of two laps around a standard 400 m track and has always been an Olympic event. It was included in the first women's track programme in 1928 but was suspended until 1960.

David Rudisha (Kenya) is the current recordholder: 1:40.91, London, 9 August 2012. Jarmila Kratochvílová (Czechoslovakia) set the current women's record: 1:53.28, Munich, 26 July 1983.

=== 880 yards ===
The 880-yard (804.67 m) run, or half-mile, was the forebear to the 800 m distance and has its roots in competitions in the United Kingdom in the 1830s.

=== 1000 metres ===
This distance is not commonly raced, though it is more common than the 500 m event is for sprinters. This is commonly raced as an indoor men's heptathlon event, or as an indoor high school event. In 1881, Lon Myers set what was then a world record at 1000 yards, running it in 2:13.0.

The men's record is held by Emmanuel Wanyonyi (Kenya) (2:11.83, Monaco, 10 July 2026), while Svetlana Masterkova (Russia) set the women's record (2:28.98, Brussels, 23 August 1996).

=== 1200 metres ===
Three laps. A distance seldom raced on its own, but commonly raced as part of the distance medley relay. This distance is short of three quarters of a mile (1,320 yards or 1,207m) by about 7 metres.

There are no official world records or world bests. However, Hicham El Guerrouj of Morocco holds the fastest recorded 1200 metre split in an official race: 2:44.75 en route to a 3:26.96 1500 m in a 2002 meeting in Rieti.

In 2026, during the build up to his mile world record, Josh Kerr of Great Britain ran a 2:42.45 1200 m time trial in Albuquerque.

=== 1500 metres ===
Also known as the metric mile, this is a premier middle-distance race, covering three and three-quarters laps around a standard Olympic-sized track. In recent years, races over this distance have become more of a prolonged sprint, with each lap averaging 55 seconds for the world record performance by Hicham El Guerrouj of Morocco: 3:26.00 on 14 July 1998 at Rome (two 1:50 min 800 m performances back to back). Thus, speed is necessary, and it seems that the more aerobic conditioning, the better.

Faith Kipyegon from Kenya holds the women's world record: 3:48.68 set in Eugene on 5 July 2025.

This is a difficult distance at which to compete mentally, in addition to being one of the more tactical middle-distance track events. The distance is often witness to some of the most tactical, physical races in the sport, as many championship races are won in the final few metres.

=== 1600 metres ===
At exactly four laps of a normal 400 m track, this distance is raced as a near replacement for the mile (it is, in fact, 9.344 m, about 30.6 feet shorter; however, it is still colloquially referred to as "the mile"). The 1600 meters is the official distance for this range of races in US high schools. While this race is rarely run outside high school and collegiate invitational competitions, it has been held at the international level. The 1500 m, however, is the most common distance run at the college and international levels. The final leg of a distance medley relay is 1600 metres.

An accurate way to run an actual mile on a metric track is to run the additional 9.344 meters before starting the first marked 400-meter lap. Many tracks, especially high-level tracks, will have a waterfall starting line drawn 9.344 meters back for this purpose. Otherwise, on a metric track, there will be a relay zone 10 meters before the common start/finish line, frequently marked by a triangle pointed toward the finish. In many configurations, that triangle is about half a meter wide, making its point extremely close to the mile start line, which would be slightly less than two feet from the marked relay zone (the widest part of the triangle, or line).

When converted down to 1600 m, Josh Kerr ran an equivalent of a 3:41.37 1600m in his 2026 world record mile of 3:42.66.

Likewise, when converted down to 1600 m, Faith Kipyegon ran an equivalent of a 4:06.20 1600m in her 2023 world record mile of 4:07.64.

=== Mile ===
This length of middle-distance race, 1,760 yards (1,609.344 m), is very common in countries that do not use the metric system, and is still often referred to as the "Blue Riband" of the track. When World Athletics (then known as the International Amateur Athletic Federation) decided in 1976 to recognize only world records for metric distances, it made an exception for the mile, and records are kept to this day.

Historically, the mile took the place that the 1500 m has today. It is still raced on the world-class level, but usually only on select occasions, like the famous Wanamaker Mile, held annually at the Millrose Games. Running a mile in less than four minutes is a famously difficult achievement, long thought impossible by the scientific community. The first man to break the four-minute barrier was Englishman Roger Bannister at Oxford in 1954.

The current record holders are Josh Kerr (Great Britain) (3:42.66, London, 18 July 2026) and Faith Kipyegon (Kenya) (4:07.64, Monaco, 21 July 2023).

=== 2000 metres ===
The men's world record is held by Norway's Jakob Ingebrigtsen, who ran a time of 4:43.13 in 2023, beating the previous record held by Hicham El Guerrouj (Morocco) (4:44.79, Berlin, 7 September 1999).

Jessica Hull of Australia is the women's world record holder, with her time of 5:19.70, ran in 2024.

The 2000m is not an official world record event indoors.

=== 3000 metres ===
Truly on the borderline between middle and longer distances, the 3000 m (7.5 laps) is a standard race in the United States. Between 1983 and 1993 it was a world championship event for women at the outdoor World Athletics Championships and Olympics. The 1984 Olympic race was famous for the controversial collision between Mary Decker and Zola Budd. The race has been a fixture at the World Athletics Indoor Championships since its inception in 1985 as the longest race for both men and women. This race requires decent speed, but a lack of natural quickness can be made up for with superior aerobic conditioning and race tactics. The records at this distance were set by Jakob Ingebrigtsen (Norway) (7:17.55, Silesia, 25 August 2024) and Junxia Wang (China) (8:06.11, Beijing, 13 September 1993).

=== 3200 metres ===
At exactly eight laps on a standard 400 m track, this event is typically run only in American high schools, along with the 1600 m. It is colloquially called the "two-mile", as the distance is only 18.688 metres shorter. In college, the typical runner of this event would convert to the 5,000-metre run (or potentially the 3,000-metre run during the indoor season). In most eastern American high schools, colleges, and middle schools, this event is usually considered a long-distance event, depending on the region. It is the longest track distance run in most high school competitions.

Jakob Ingebrigtsen ran an equivalent of a 7:51.35 3200m in his 2023 world best of 7:54.10 in the two mile run.

Meseret Defar ran an equivalent of an 8:55.45 3200m in her 2007 world best of 8:58.58 in the two mile run.

=== Two miles ===
This length of long middle-distance or short long-distance race was 3,520 yards (3,218.688 m).

Historically, the two-mile took the place that the 3000 m and the 3200 m have today. The first man to break the four-minute barrier for both miles was Daniel Komen (Kenya) at Hechtel, Belgium on 19 July 1997 in a time of 7:58.61. The current world record in the two-mile is held by Jakob Ingebrigtsen, who ran 7:54.10 in the 2023 Paris Diamond League meet on 9 June 2023, although the distance's world record is not tracked by the International Olympic Committee. Meseret Defar (Ethiopia) is the fastest woman: 8:58.58, Brussels, Belgium, 14 September 2007.

=== 2000 metres steeplechase ===
Another race that is only run in high school or Master meets. The typical specialist in this event would move up to the 3000-metre steeplechase in college.

=== 3,000-metre steeplechase ===
A 3,000-metre steeplechase is a distance event requiring greater strength, stamina, and agility than the flat 3,000-metre event. This is because athletes are required to jump over five barriers per lap, after a flat first 200 m to allow for settling in. One barrier per lap is placed in front of a water pit, meaning that runners are also forced to deal with the chafing of wet shoes as they race. The world records are held by Lamecha Girma (Ethiopia) (7:52.11, Paris. 9 June 2023) and Gulnara Samitova (Russia) (8:58.81, Beijing, 17 August 2008).

== See also ==
- Long-distance running
- The Flying Finns
