= WASF3 =

Identifiers
- Aliases: WASF3, Brush-1, SCAR3, WAVE3, WAS protein family member 3, WASP family member 3
- External IDs: OMIM: 605068; MGI: 2658986; GeneCards: WASF3

Gene location (Human)
Chr.	Chromosome 13 (human)
Band	13q12.13	Start	26,557,683 bp
Band	13q12.13	End	26,688,948 bp

Gene location (Mouse)
Chr.	Chromosome 5 (mouse)
Band	5|5 G3	Start	146,321,795 bp
Band	5|5 G3	End	146,410,425 bp
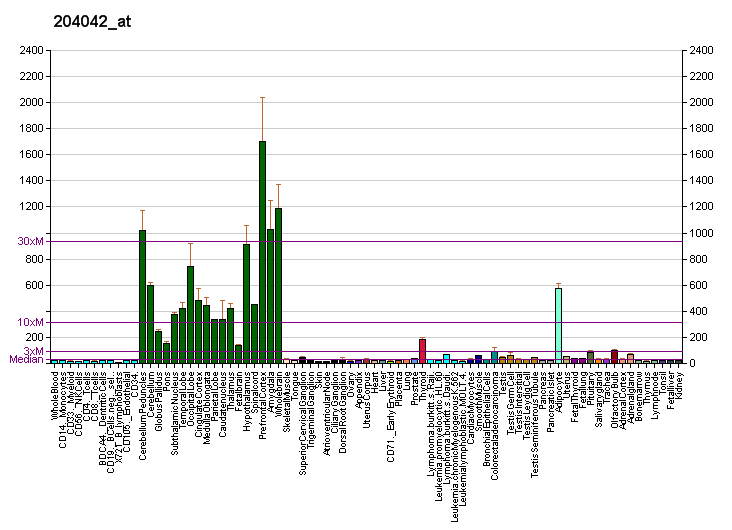
RNA expression pattern
Bgee	Human / Mouse (ortholog); Top expressed in: pars compacta; pars reticulata; paraflocculus of cerebellum; lateral nuclear group of thalamus; orbitofrontal cortex; cerebellar vermis; postcentral gyrus; external globus pallidus; Brodmann area 46; dorsal motor nucleus of vagus nerve / Top expressed in: ventral tegmental area; neural layer of retina; lobe of cerebellum; cerebellar vermis; dorsomedial hypothalamic nucleus; mammillary body; globus pallidus; lateral hypothalamus; lateral septal nucleus; deep cerebellar nuclei; More reference expression data
BioGPS	More reference expression data
Gene ontology
Molecular function	actin binding
Cellular component	cytoplasm; extracellular exosome; cytoskeleton; lamellipodium; postsynapse; glutamatergic synapse
Biological process	positive regulation of myelination; oligodendrocyte development; actin filament polymerization; cytoskeleton organization; actin cytoskeleton organization; lamellipodium assembly; regulation of cell shape; protein-containing complex assembly; modification of postsynaptic actin cytoskeleton
Sources:Amigo / QuickGO
Orthologs
Databases	NCBI: entry; OMA: entry
Species	Human	Mouse
Entrez	10810	245880
Ensembl	ENSG00000132970	ENSMUSG00000029636
UniProt	Q9UPY6; Q5T8P4	Q8VHI6
RefSeq (mRNA)	NM_001291965; NM_006646	NM_145155
RefSeq (protein)	NP_001278894; NP_006637; NP_006637.2	NP_660137
Location (UCSC)	Chr 13: 26.56 – 26.69 Mb	Chr 5: 146.32 – 146.41 Mb
PubMed search
- Wikidata
View/Edit Human	View/Edit Mouse

Wiskott–Aldrich syndrome protein family member 3 is a protein that in humans is encoded by the WASF3 gene.

This gene encodes a member of the Wiskott–Aldrich syndrome protein family. The gene product is a protein that forms a multiprotein complex that links receptor kinases and actin. Binding to actin occurs through a C-terminal verprolin homology domain in all family members. The multiprotein complex serves to transduce signals that involve changes in cell shape, motility or function.

== See also ==
- WASp (encoded by WAS gene)
- WASF1
- WASF2
