= JMY =

JMY may refer to:

- Jangal Mariala railway station, in Pakistan
- JMY Records, an Italian record label
- Junction-Mediating and Regulatory Protein, a cofactor for p300 that regulates p53 response
