= WAVE regulatory complex =

The WAVE regulatory complex (WRC, SCAR complex) is a five-subunit protein complex in the Wiskott–Aldrich syndrome protein (WASp) family,involved in the formation of the actin cytoskeleton through interaction with the Arp2/3 complex. The holocomplex comprises WAVE1 (also known as WASF1), CYFIP1, ABI2, Nap1 and HSPC300 in its canonical form, or orthologues of these.

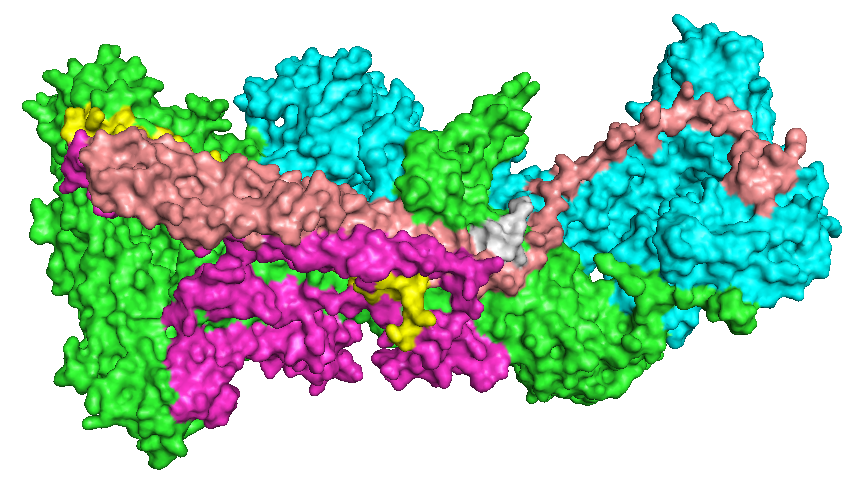
Surface model of the WAVE regulatory holocomplex displaying all five of its components in heteropentameric form.

== Composition ==
The proteins within the WRC form a CYFIP1-Nap1 heterodimer and a WAVE1-Abi2-HSPC300 heterotrimer, and following interaction with Rac1, the holocomplex has been observed in a CYFIP1-Nap1-Abi2 heterotrimer subcomplex and an active WAVE1-HSPC300 heterodimer subcomplex.

== Function ==
WRC recruitment to the sites of actin nucleation events at the cell periphery is mediated by the binding of a number of ligands containing a conserved WRC interacting receptor sequence (WIRS) which binds to a conserved location shared across the surfaces of Abi2 and CYFIP1. The WRC is activated by interaction with the Rac1 (via the CYFIP1 component of the complex) and Arf small GTPases (such as ARF1, ARF5, and ARF6 ) or the similar protein ARL1, which causes dissociation of the CYFIP1-Nap1-Abi2 heterotrimer at the membrane periphery. This allows the V domain of the WAVE1 component to interact with the actin monomers while its CA domain interacts with the Arp2/3 complex, allowing the Arp2/3 complex to act as a nucleation core for the branching and extension of actin filaments.
