= Blue ribbon (disambiguation) =

The blue ribbon is a symbol of high quality.

Blue ribbon or Blue Ribbon may refer to:

- Blue ribbon badge, symbol of the temperance movement
- Blue Ribbon (software house) a budget home computer software publisher of the 1980s
- Blue Ribbon Award (disambiguation)
  - Japan's Blue Ribbon Awards
- Blue Ribbon Barbecue, a chain of 2 restaurants and a catering service in the Boston suburbs
- Blue Ribbon Intermediate Holdings, owner of Pabst Brewing Company
- Blue Ribbon fishery, fisheries officially or informally designated as being of extremely high quality
- Blue Ribbon Merrie Melodies, a reissue of Warner Bros Merrie Melodies and Looney Tunes series; see list of Warner Bros. cartoons with Blue Ribbon reissues
- Blue Ribbon Online Free Speech Campaign
- Blue Ribbon Pairs, also known as the Edgar Kaplan Blue Ribbon Pairs, a duplicate bridge event held by the American Contract Bridge League
- Blue-ribbon panel, a group of exceptional people appointed to study a given question
- Blue Ribbon Schools Program, a US government program to honor schools
- Blue Ribbon Sports, the original name of sports-shoe manufacturer, Nike, Inc.
- The emblem of the Order of the Garter
- Medals of Honor (Japan)
- List of awareness ribbons
- Blue ribbon, a Crayola crayon color, see List of Crayola crayon colors#The 100,000,000,000th Crayon

== See also ==
- Blue Riband (disambiguation)
- Cordon Bleu (disambiguation)
