= Blue Ribbon Award =

Blue Ribbon Award can refer to:

- Blue Ribbon Award (railway), an annual award presented by the Japan Railfan Club
- Blue Ribbon Award, South Korea chef award presented by Blue Ribbon Survey
- Blue Ribbon Awards, annual Japanese film awards
- Blue Ribbon Award of Excellence in Education, awarded by the National Blue Ribbon Schools Program

== See also ==
- Blue Riband (disambiguation)
- Blue ribbon (disambiguation)
- Cordon Bleu (disambiguation)
