= BAIAP2 =

Protein-coding gene in the species Homo sapiens

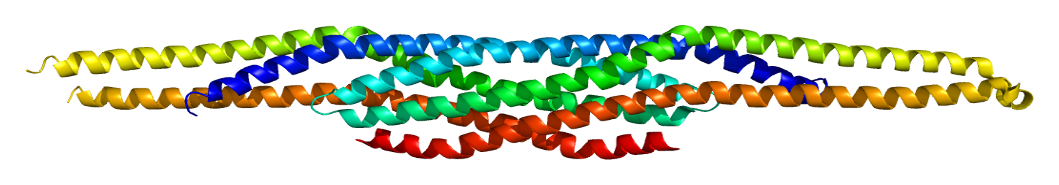

Identifiers
- Aliases: BAIAP2, BAP2, FLAF3, IRSP53, BAI1 associated protein 2, BAR/IMD domain containing adaptor protein 2, WAML
- External IDs: OMIM: 605475; MGI: 2137336; GeneCards: BAIAP2
Available structures
PDB	Ortholog search: PDBe RCSB
PDB	List of PDB id codes 1WDZ, 1Y2O, 2YKT, 3RNJ, 4JS0

Gene location (Human)
Chr.	Chromosome 17 (human)
Band	17q25.3	Start	81,035,122 bp
Band	17q25.3	End	81,117,432 bp

Gene location (Mouse)
Chr.	Chromosome 11 (mouse)
Band	11|11 E2	Start	119,833,589 bp
Band	11|11 E2	End	119,897,608 bp
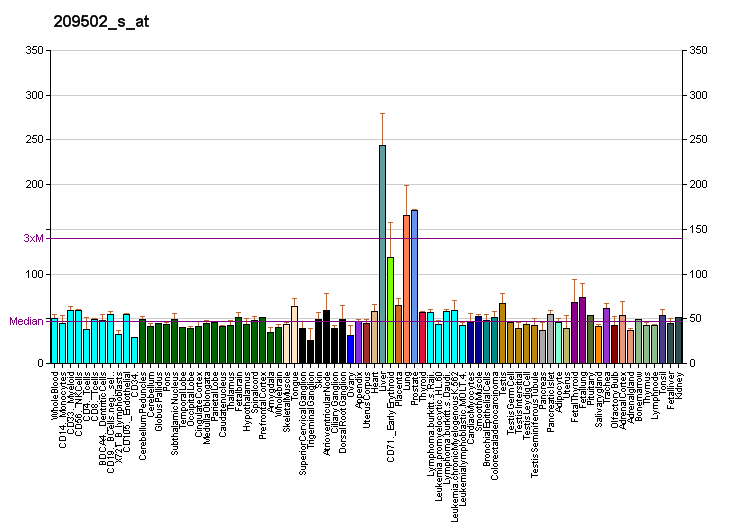

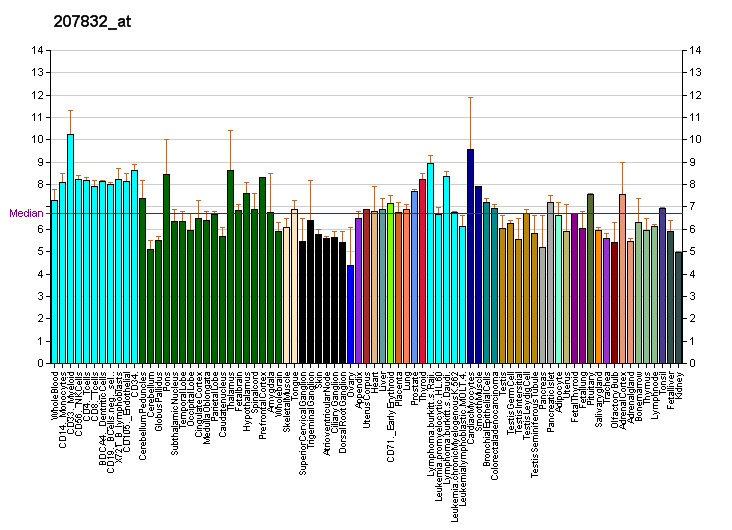

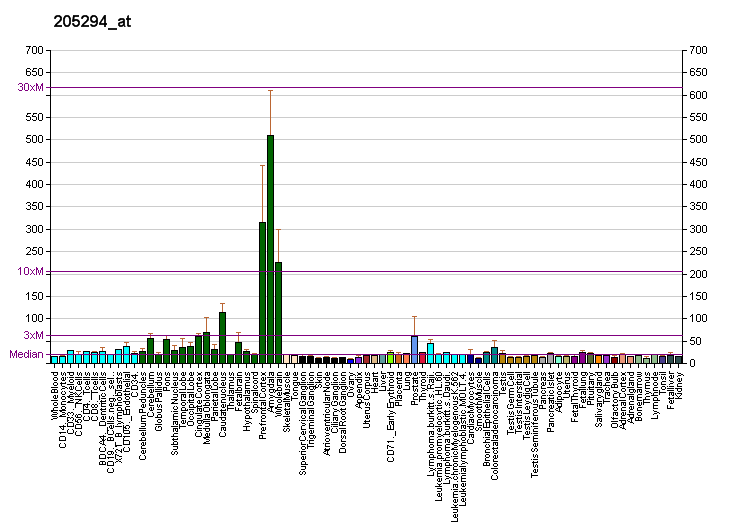
RNA expression pattern
Bgee	Human / Mouse (ortholog); Top expressed in: Brodmann area 10; frontal pole; middle frontal gyrus; right frontal lobe; skin of abdomen; anterior cingulate cortex; skin of leg; Brodmann area 9; caudate nucleus; nucleus accumbens / Top expressed in: superior frontal gyrus; olfactory tubercle; dentate gyrus of hippocampal formation granule cell; primary visual cortex; piriform cortex; corneal stroma; nucleus accumbens; perirhinal cortex; entorhinal cortex; primary motor cortex; More reference expression data
BioGPS	More reference expression data
Gene ontology
Molecular function	PDZ domain binding; protein C-terminus binding; protein binding; identical protein binding; cytoskeletal anchor activity; proline-rich region binding; cadherin binding involved in cell-cell adhesion; transcription coregulator binding; scaffold protein binding
Cellular component	cytosol; cell projection; postsynaptic density; membrane; filopodium; ruffle; dendritic spine; secretory granule; soma; actin cytoskeleton; neuron projection; extracellular exosome; cytoskeleton; cytoplasm; rough endoplasmic reticulum; Golgi apparatus; microtubule; plasma membrane; dendritic shaft; neuron projection terminus; excitatory synapse; synaptic membrane; postsynapse; neuron projection branch point; dendritic spine cytoplasm; presynapse; nucleoplasm; Schaffer collateral - CA1 synapse; glutamatergic synapse; postsynaptic density, intracellular component; presynaptic cytosol; postsynaptic cytosol
Biological process	insulin receptor signaling pathway; positive regulation of actin filament polymerization; regulation of actin cytoskeleton organization; response to bacterium; axonogenesis; Fc-gamma receptor signaling pathway involved in phagocytosis; dendrite development; actin filament bundle assembly; regulation of synaptic plasticity; vascular endothelial growth factor receptor signaling pathway; actin crosslink formation; regulation of cell shape; plasma membrane organization; positive regulation of actin cytoskeleton reorganization; positive regulation of dendritic spine morphogenesis; cell-cell adhesion; brain development; positive regulation of neuron projection development; neuron differentiation; protein localization to synapse; cellular response to epidermal growth factor stimulus; cellular response to L-glutamate; positive regulation of excitatory postsynaptic potential; modulation of chemical synaptic transmission; modification of synaptic structure, modulating synaptic transmission; regulation of modification of postsynaptic actin cytoskeleton
Sources:Amigo / QuickGO
Orthologs
Databases	NCBI: entry; OMA: entry
Species	Human	Mouse
Entrez	10458	108100
Ensembl	ENSG00000175866	ENSMUSG00000025372
UniProt	Q9UQB8	Q8BKX1
RefSeq (mRNA)	NM_001144888; NM_006340; NM_017450; NM_017451	NM_001037754; NM_001037755; NM_130862
RefSeq (protein)	NP_001138360; NP_006331; NP_059344; NP_059345	NP_001032843; NP_001032844; NP_570932
Location (UCSC)	Chr 17: 81.04 – 81.12 Mb	Chr 11: 119.83 – 119.9 Mb
PubMed search
- Wikidata
View/Edit Human	View/Edit Mouse

Brain-specific angiogenesis inhibitor 1-associated protein 2 is a protein that in humans is encoded by the BAIAP2 gene.

== Function ==
The protein encoded by this gene has been identified as a brain-specific angiogenesis inhibitor (BAI1)-binding protein. This interaction at the cytoplasmic membrane is crucial to the function of this protein, which may be involved in neuronal growth-cone guidance. This protein functions as an insulin receptor tyrosine kinase substrate and suggests a role for insulin in the central nervous system. This protein has also been identified as interacting with the dentatorubral-pallidoluysian atrophy gene, which is associated with an autosomal dominant neurodegenerative disease. It also associates with a downstream effector of Rho small G proteins, which is associated with the formation of stress fibers and cytokinesis. Alternative splicing of the 3'-end of this gene results in three products of undetermined function. The I-BAR/IMD domain of BAIAP2/IRSp53 binds to and deform the plasma membrane for cellular protrusions.

== Interactions ==
BAIAP2 has been shown to interact with:

- ATN1,
- CDC42,
- EPS8,
- RAC1,
- SHANK1,
- WASF1, and
- WASF2.
