= Profilin 1 =

Protein-coding gene in the species Homo sapiens

PFN1
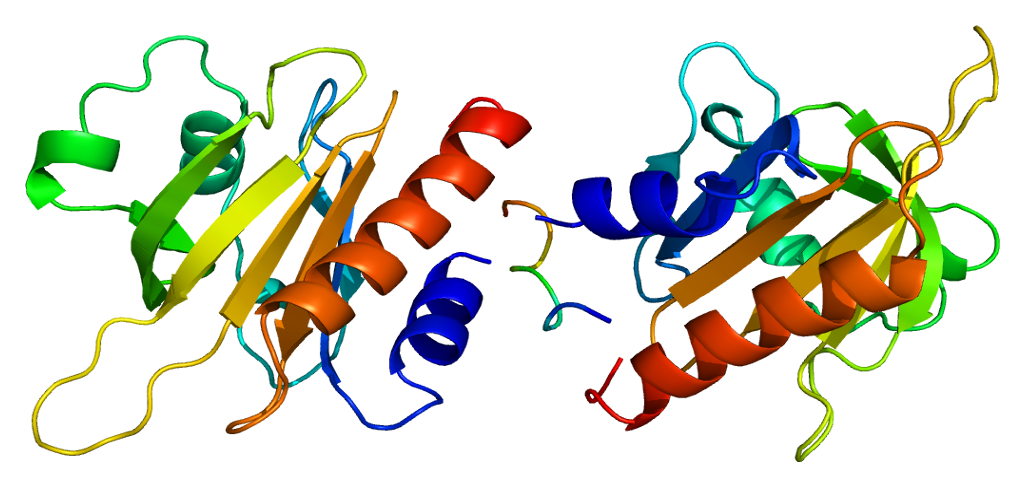

Identifiers
- Aliases: PFN1, ALS18, Profilin 1
- External IDs: OMIM: 176610; MGI: 97549; GeneCards: PFN1
Available structures
PDB	Ortholog search: PDBe RCSB
PDB	List of PDB id codes 1AWI, 1CF0, 1CJF, 1FIK, 1FIL, 1PFL, 2PAV, 2PBD, 3CHW, 4X1L, 4X1M, 4X25

Gene location (Human)
Chr.	Chromosome 17 (human)
Band	17p13.2	Start	4,945,652 bp
Band	17p13.2	End	4,949,061 bp

Gene location (Mouse)
Chr.	Chromosome 11 (mouse)
Band	11 B3|11 43.21 cM	Start	70,542,676 bp
Band	11 B3|11 43.21 cM	End	70,545,470 bp
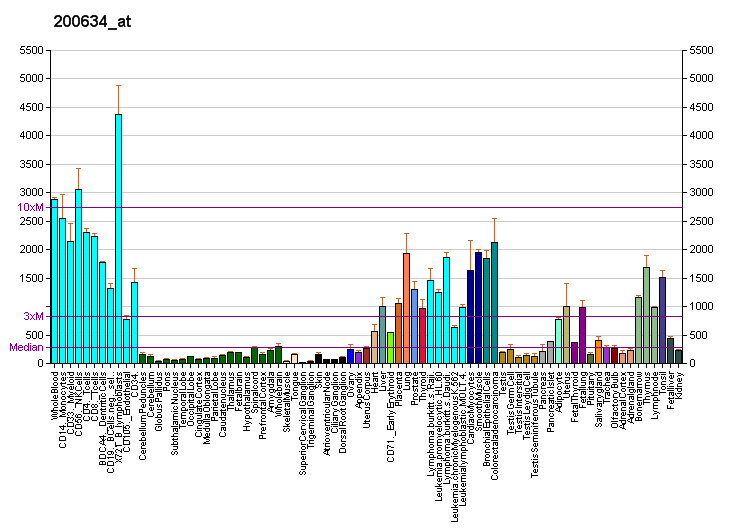
RNA expression pattern
Bgee	Human / Mouse (ortholog); Top expressed in: granulocyte; mucosa of transverse colon; muscle layer of sigmoid colon; mucosa of ileum; monocyte; thoracic aorta; ascending aorta; stromal cell of endometrium; Descending thoracic aorta; left coronary artery / Top expressed in: granulocyte; yolk sac; tail of embryo; thymus; tibiofemoral joint; lymph node; mesenteric lymph nodes; genital tubercle; epiblast; ascending aorta; More reference expression data
BioGPS	More reference expression data
Gene ontology
Molecular function	actin monomer binding; protein binding; adenyl-nucleotide exchange factor activity; actin binding; proline-rich region binding; RNA binding; cadherin binding; signaling receptor binding; phosphatidylinositol-4,5-bisphosphate binding
Cellular component	cytosol; blood microparticle; membrane; focal adhesion; cell cortex; extracellular exosome; cytoskeleton; cytoplasm; nucleus; extracellular space; neuron projection; synapse; glutamatergic synapse
Biological process	positive regulation of actin filament polymerization; positive regulation of ATP-dependent activity; negative regulation of actin filament polymerization; positive regulation of ruffle assembly; regulation of transcription by RNA polymerase II; protein stabilization; positive regulation of epithelial cell migration; negative regulation of actin filament bundle assembly; neural tube closure; positive regulation of actin filament bundle assembly; negative regulation of stress fiber assembly; actin cytoskeleton organization; Wnt signaling pathway, planar cell polarity pathway; response to organic substance; positive regulation of transcription by RNA polymerase II; positive regulation of viral transcription; positive regulation of DNA metabolic process; positive regulation of stress fiber assembly; cellular response to growth factor stimulus; regulation of actin filament polymerization; synapse maturation; modification of postsynaptic actin cytoskeleton
Sources:Amigo / QuickGO
Orthologs
Databases	NCBI: entry; OMA: entry
Species	Human	Mouse
Entrez	5216	18643
Ensembl	ENSG00000108518	ENSMUSG00000018293
UniProt	P07737	P62962
RefSeq (mRNA)	NM_005022; NM_001375991	NM_011072
RefSeq (protein)	NP_005013; NP_001362920	NP_035202
Location (UCSC)	Chr 17: 4.95 – 4.95 Mb	Chr 11: 70.54 – 70.55 Mb
PubMed search
- Wikidata
View/Edit Human	View/Edit Mouse

Profilin-1 is a protein that in humans is encoded by the PFN1 gene.

== Structure ==
The PFN1 protein, also known as profilin-1, is a small, monomeric protein composed of 139–140 amino acids with a molecular mass of approximately 15 kDa. Its three-dimensional structure features an antiparallel, seven-stranded β-sheet core flanked by three amphipathic α-helices—two on one side of the sheet and one on the other—forming a compact, globular fold known as the "profilin-like" fold. PFN1 contains three key functional domains: an actin-binding domain, a poly-L-proline (PLP)-binding domain, and a phosphoinositide-binding domain. These domains enable PFN1 to interact with actin monomers, polyproline-rich motifs in various cytoskeletal proteins, and phosphoinositides, respectively, facilitating its central role in actin cytoskeleton dynamics. Structural studies, including NMR and X-ray crystallography, have shown that PFN1’s binding sites for actin and PLP are distinct and flexible, allowing the protein to adopt different conformations when free or bound to its ligands. This structural versatility is essential for PFN1’s function in actin polymerization and its involvement in numerous cellular processes.

== Function ==
The protein encoded by this gene is a ubiquitously expressed actin monomer-binding protein belonging to the profilin family. It is believed to regulate actin polymerization in response to extracellular signals. Profilin-1 also functions as a pseudouridine-binding protein, contributing to the stability and translational efficiency of certain mRNAs.

Profilin 1 (PFN1) is a highly conserved actin-binding protein that plays a central role in regulating actin polymerization and, consequently, the dynamics of the actin cytoskeleton. By binding actin monomers, PFN1 promotes their incorporation into growing actin filaments, thereby influencing key cellular processes such as cell motility, membrane trafficking, endocytosis, cell cycle progression, and cell survival.

In addition to its canonical role in actin dynamics, PFN1 interacts with poly-L-proline–rich motifs found in various signaling and cytoskeletal proteins, as well as with phosphoinositide lipids, thereby linking cytoskeletal regulation to intracellular signaling pathways. Recent studies have expanded the known functions of PFN1 to include roles in microtubule organization, mitochondrial homeostasis, and the regulation of autophagy and mitophagy.

Disruption of PFN1 function through mutation or loss has been implicated in several diseases, including neurodegenerative disorders such as amyotrophic lateral sclerosis (ALS), as well as various cancers and cardiovascular conditions. PFN1 thus acts as a key integrator of cytoskeletal dynamics and intracellular signaling, playing a critical role in maintaining normal cell function and viability.

== Clinical significance ==
Deletion of this gene is associated with Miller-Dieker syndrome. Mutations in this gene may be a rare cause of amyotrophic lateral sclerosis, also called Lou Gehrig's disease.

== Interactions ==
Profilin 1 has been shown to interact with:

- FMNL1,
- MLLT4
- Vasodilator-stimulated phosphoprotein,
- WASF1, and
- WASL.
