= TVP23B =

Protein-coding gene in the species Homo sapiens

Identifiers
- Aliases: TVP23B, FAM18B, FAM18B1, NPD008, YDR084C, CGI-148, trans-golgi network vesicle protein 23 homolog B (S. cerevisiae), trans-golgi network vesicle protein 23 homolog B
- External IDs: MGI: 1914760; HomoloGene: 128511; GeneCards: TVP23B; OMA:TVP23B - orthologs

Gene location (Human)
Chr.	Chromosome 17 (human)
Band	17p11.2	Start	18,781,111 bp
Band	17p11.2	End	18,806,714 bp

Gene location (Mouse)
Chr.	Chromosome 11 (mouse)
Band	11|11 B2	Start	62,770,281 bp
Band	11|11 B2	End	62,807,606 bp
RNA expression pattern
Bgee	Human / Mouse (ortholog); Top expressed in: islet of Langerhans; Achilles tendon; stromal cell of endometrium; mucosa of esophagus; gonad; olfactory zone of nasal mucosa; body of pancreas; rectum; anterior pituitary; gallbladder / Top expressed in: otolith organ; utricle; vestibular sensory epithelium; superior cervical ganglion; lobe of prostate; olfactory epithelium; parotid gland; seminal vesicula; ciliary body; submandibular gland; More reference expression data
BioGPS	n/a
Orthologs
Species	Human	Mouse
Entrez	51030	67510
Ensembl	ENSG00000171928	ENSMUSG00000014177
UniProt	Q9NYZ1	Q9D8T4
RefSeq (mRNA)	NM_016078; NM_001316919; NM_001316920; NM_001316921; NM_001316922 NM_001316923; NM_001316924	NM_026210; NM_001356520; NM_001356521
RefSeq (protein)	NP_001303848; NP_001303849; NP_001303850; NP_001303851; NP_001303852 NP_001303853; NP_057162	NP_080486; NP_001343449; NP_001343450
Location (UCSC)	Chr 17: 18.78 – 18.81 Mb	Chr 11: 62.77 – 62.81 Mb
PubMed search
- Wikidata
View/Edit Human	View/Edit Mouse

Golgi apparatus membrane protein TVP23 homolog B is a protein encoded by the gene TVP23B.

This gene has two paralog in the human genome, TVP23C, which is located on chromosome 17 at 17p12, and TVP23A, which is located on chromosome 16. The duplication appears to have appeared after the MRCA of humans and apes. This gene has homologs in eukaryotes as far back as Trichoplax.

== Gene ==
TVP23B is highly conserved in chordates and also shows conservation in eukaryotes, including fungi and plants. The most common mRNA has 7 exons.

== Protein ==
This gene encode a protein of 205 amino acids in length and a predicted molecular weight of 23.57 kDa. This protein is predicted to have an isoelectric point of 8.62. It contains a domain of unknown function, DUF846, and a predicted phosphoserine site. It is a multipass transmembrane protein and a member of the FAM18/TVP23 superfamily.

TVP23B appears to be ubiquitously expressed in all tissues, health states, and developmental stages to some level. There is also notable expression in bladder tissue.
