= Intersectin 2 =

Gene of the species Homo sapiens

ITSN2
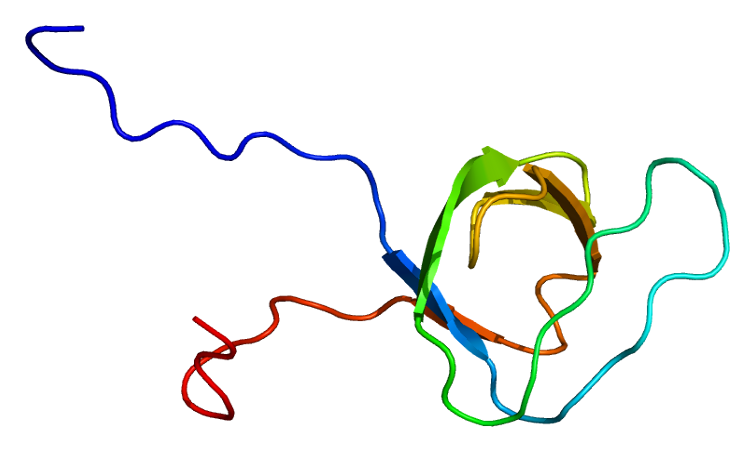

Identifiers
- Aliases: ITSN2, PRO2015, SH3D1B, SH3P18, SWA, SWAP, intersectin 2
- External IDs: OMIM: 604464; MGI: 1338049; GeneCards: ITSN2
Available structures
| PDB | Ortholog search: PDBe RCSB |
| PDB | List of PDB id codes 1J3T, 1UDL, 1UE9, 1UFF, 1UHF, 3GF9, 3JZY, 4IIO |

Gene location (Mouse)
| Chr. | Chromosome 12 (mouse) |
| Band | 12|12 A1.1 | Start | 4,642,638 bp |
| Band | 12|12 A1.1 | End | 4,763,962 bp |
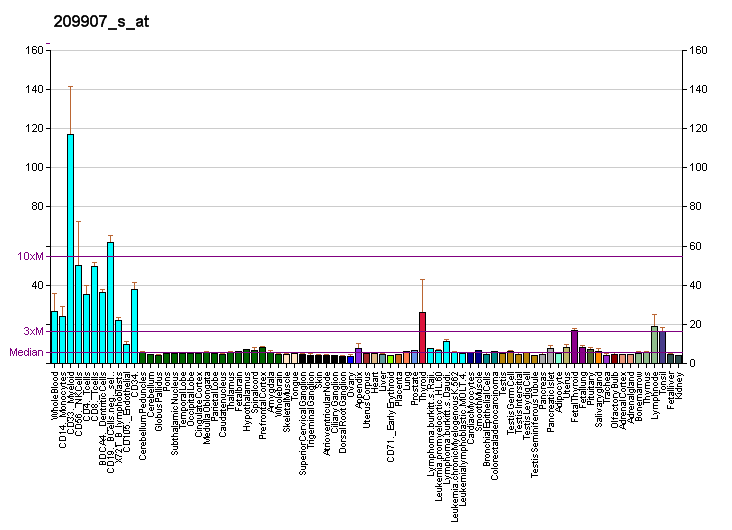
RNA expression pattern
| Bgee | Human / Mouse (ortholog); n/a / Top expressed in: zygote; granulocyte; secondary oocyte; iris; ciliary body; spleen; conjunctival fornix; neural layer of retina; retinal pigment epithelium; blood |
| BioGPS | More reference expression data |
Gene ontology
| Molecular function | calcium ion binding; protein binding; metal ion binding |
| Cellular component | cytoplasm; centrosome; extracellular exosome |
| Biological process | positive regulation of dendrite extension; cell differentiation; regulation of Rho protein signal transduction; endocytosis; positive regulation of signal transduction; regulation of molecular function; viral process |
Sources:Amigo / QuickGO
Orthologs
| Databases | NCBI: entry; OMA: entry |
| Species | Human | Mouse |
| Entrez | 50618 | 20403 |
| Ensembl | ENSG00000198399 | ENSMUSG00000020640 |
| UniProt | Q9NZM3 | Q9Z0R6 |
| RefSeq (mRNA) | NM_147152; NM_006277; NM_019595 | NM_001198968; NM_001198969; NM_011365 |
| RefSeq (protein) | NP_006268; NP_062541; NP_671494; NP_001335110; NP_001335111 NP_001335112; NP_001335113; NP_001335114; NP_001335115 | n/a |
| Location (UCSC) | n/a | Chr 12: 4.64 – 4.76 Mb |
| PubMed search |
- Wikidata
| View/Edit Human | View/Edit Mouse |

Intersectin-2 is a protein that in humans is encoded by the ITSN2 gene.

This gene encodes a cytoplasmic protein which contains SH3 domains. This protein is a member of a family of proteins involved in clathrin-mediated endocytosis. Intersectin 2 is thought to regulate the formation of clathrin-coated vesicles and also may function in the induction of T cell antigen receptor (TCR) endocytosis. Alternatively spliced transcript variants have been found for this gene that encode three distinct isoforms. Additional variants have been found but their full length nature has not been determined.

== Interactions ==
ITSN2 has been shown to interact with Wiskott-Aldrich syndrome protein.
