= FMNL2 =

Protein-coding gene in the species Homo sapiens

Identifiers
- Aliases: FMNL2, FHOD2, formin like 2
- External IDs: OMIM: 616285; MGI: 1918659; GeneCards: FMNL2
Available structures
| PDB | Ortholog search: PDBe RCSB |
| PDB | List of PDB id codes 4YC7 |

Gene location (Human)
| Chr. | Chromosome 2 (human) |
| Band | 2q23.3 | Start | 152,335,174 bp |
| Band | 2q23.3 | End | 152,649,826 bp |

Gene location (Mouse)
| Chr. | Chromosome 2 (mouse) |
| Band | 2|2 C1.1 | Start | 52,747,872 bp |
| Band | 2|2 C1.1 | End | 53,023,816 bp |
RNA expression pattern
| Bgee | Human / Mouse (ortholog); Top expressed in: inferior ganglion of vagus nerve; corpus callosum; subthalamic nucleus; external globus pallidus; medulla oblongata; pars reticulata; superior vestibular nucleus; ventral tegmental area; pars compacta; internal globus pallidus / Top expressed in: otolith organ; utricle; superior cervical ganglion; sciatic nerve; hand; ciliary body; Epithelium of choroid plexus; trigeminal ganglion; condyle; stria vascularis; More reference expression data |
| BioGPS | n/a |
Gene ontology
| Molecular function | actin binding; cadherin binding; GTPase activating protein binding |
| Cellular component | cytoplasm; cytosol |
| Biological process | regulation of cell morphogenesis; cortical actin cytoskeleton organization; cytoskeleton organization; actin cytoskeleton organization; cellular component organization; regulation of cell shape |
Sources:Amigo / QuickGO
Orthologs
| Databases | NCBI: entry; OMA: entry |
| Species | Human | Mouse |
| Entrez | 114793 | 71409 |
| Ensembl | ENSG00000157827 | ENSMUSG00000036053 |
| UniProt | Q96PY5 | A2APV2 |
| RefSeq (mRNA) | NM_001004417; NM_001004421; NM_001004422; NM_052905 | NM_172409 |
| RefSeq (protein) | NP_443137 | NP_765997; NP_001395244; NP_001395245; NP_001395246 |
| Location (UCSC) | Chr 2: 152.34 – 152.65 Mb | Chr 2: 52.75 – 53.02 Mb |
| PubMed search |
- Wikidata
| View/Edit Human | View/Edit Mouse |

Formin-like protein 2 is a protein that in humans is encoded by the FMNL2 gene.

== Expression ==
Alternatively spliced transcript variants of the FMNL2 gene encoding different isoforms have been described. The full length FMNL2 (FRL3) protein (1092 amino acids-NCBI Reference Sequence: NP_443137.2) is regulated through autoinhibition, and may become activated through Rho proteins. The FMNL2 gene is expressed in multiple human tissues.

== Function ==
Formin-like protein 2 is a formin-related protein. Formin-related proteins have been implicated in morphogenesis, cytokinesis, and cell polarity.

== Clinical significance ==
FMNL2 expression is considerably higher in colorectal cancer tumors compared to normal tissue.

Clinical studies showed that single nucleotide polymorphisms in the FMNL2 gene are associated with cardio and cerebrovascular risk factors and Alzheimer's disease FMNL2 links vascular disease to increased risk of Alzheimer's disease by regulating the interaction between astrocytes and blood vessels in healthy and Alzheimer's disease brains.

== See also ==
- FMNL1
- FMNL3
