= Blue Riband (disambiguation) =

The Blue Riband is an accolade given to the passenger ship that held the fastest record for transatlantic crossing.

Blue Riband may also refer to:

== In sports and motorcycling ==
- Blue Riband (greyhounds), a category 1 UK greyhound racing competition
- Blue Riband Trial Stakes, a flat horse race in the United Kingdom for three-year-old thoroughbreds
- 100 meter freestyle, a swimming event
- British Motorcyclists Federation Blue Riband award for advanced motorcycling

== Other ==
- Blue Riband (biscuits), chocolate biscuits made by Nestlé
- Blue Riband gin, an Indian gin made by United Spirits Limited
- Nastro Azzurro, an Italian lager made by Peroni

== See also ==
- Order of the Garter
- Blue ribbon (disambiguation)
- Blue Ribbon Award (disambiguation)
- Cordon Bleu (disambiguation)
