= Cordon-bleu protein-like 1 =

Protein-coding gene

COBLL1
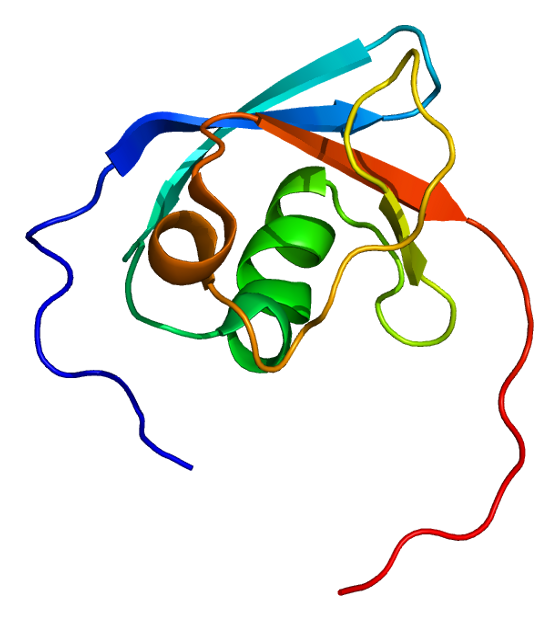

Identifiers
- Aliases: COBLL1, COBLR1, cordon-bleu WH2 repeat protein like 1
- External IDs: OMIM: 610318; MGI: 2442894; GeneCards: COBLL1
Available structures
PDB	Ortholog search: PDBe RCSB
PDB	List of PDB id codes 2DAJ

Gene location (Human)
Chr.	Chromosome 2 (human)
Band	2q24.3	Start	164,653,624 bp
Band	2q24.3	End	164,843,679 bp

Gene location (Mouse)
Chr.	Chromosome 2 (mouse)
Band	2|2 C1.3	Start	64,918,683 bp
Band	2|2 C1.3	End	65,069,747 bp
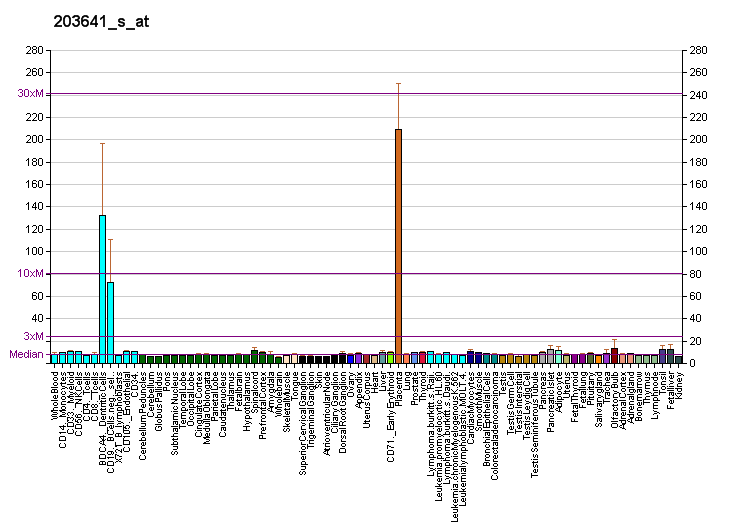

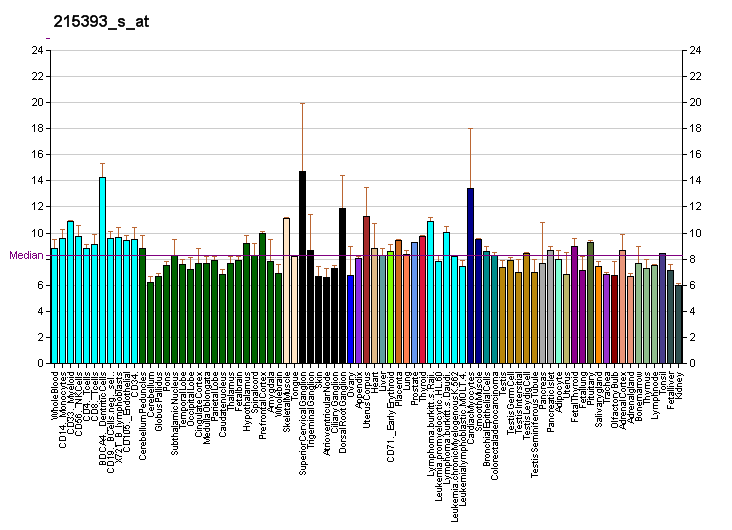

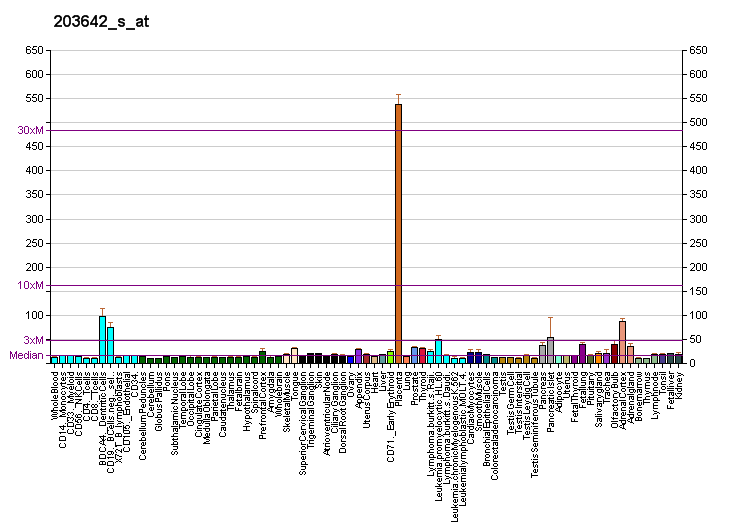
RNA expression pattern
Bgee	Human / Mouse (ortholog); Top expressed in: sural nerve; placenta; renal medulla; left adrenal gland; oral cavity; right adrenal gland; right adrenal cortex; left adrenal cortex; tail of epididymis; secondary oocyte / Top expressed in: interventricular septum; adrenal gland; parotid gland; myocardium of ventricle; prostate; secondary oocyte; lobe of prostate; primary oocyte; gastrula; iris; More reference expression data
BioGPS	More reference expression data
Gene ontology
Molecular function	actin binding; actin monomer binding; cadherin binding
Cellular component	extracellular exosome
Biological process	actin filament network formation; actin filament polymerization
Sources:Amigo / QuickGO
Orthologs
Databases	NCBI: entry; OMA: entry
Species	Human	Mouse
Entrez	22837	319876
Ensembl	ENSG00000082438	ENSMUSG00000034903
UniProt	Q53SF7	Q3UMF0
RefSeq (mRNA)	NM_014900; NM_001278458; NM_001278460; NM_001278461	NM_027225; NM_177025; NM_001363076; NM_001363077
RefSeq (protein)	NP_001265387; NP_001265389; NP_001265390; NP_055715; NP_001352599 NP_001352600; NP_001352601; NP_001352602; NP_001352603; NP_001352604	NP_081501; NP_795999; NP_001350005; NP_001350006
Location (UCSC)	Chr 2: 164.65 – 164.84 Mb	Chr 2: 64.92 – 65.07 Mb
PubMed search
- Wikidata
View/Edit Human	View/Edit Mouse

Cordon-bleu protein-like 1 is a protein that in humans is encoded by the COBLL1 gene.
