= Formin-2 =

Actin binding structural protein

FMN2

Identifiers
- Aliases: FMN2, formin 2, Formin-2
- External IDs: OMIM: 606373; MGI: 1859252; GeneCards: FMN2
Available structures
PDB	Ortholog search: PDBe RCSB
PDB	List of PDB id codes 2YLE, 3R7G

Gene location (Human)
Chr.	Chromosome 1 (human)
Band	1q43	Start	240,014,348 bp
Band	1q43	End	240,475,187 bp

Gene location (Mouse)
Chr.	Chromosome 1 (mouse)
Band	1 H3|1 81.04 cM	Start	174,329,391 bp
Band	1 H3|1 81.04 cM	End	174,650,295 bp
RNA expression pattern
Bgee	Human / Mouse (ortholog); Top expressed in: prefrontal cortex; Brodmann area 9; cingulate gyrus; anterior cingulate cortex; right frontal lobe; sural nerve; caudate nucleus; amygdala; superior frontal gyrus; ganglionic eminence / Top expressed in: secondary oocyte; zygote; primary oocyte; extraocular muscle; olfactory epithelium; Rostral migratory stream; sciatic nerve; dorsomedial hypothalamic nucleus; supraoptic nucleus; habenula; More reference expression data
BioGPS	n/a
Gene ontology
Molecular function	actin binding; molecular function
Cellular component	cytoplasm; cytosol; endoplasmic reticulum membrane; membrane; plasma membrane; spindle; microvillus; cell cortex; nucleolus; endoplasmic reticulum; actin cytoskeleton; perinuclear region of cytoplasm; cytoskeleton; cytoplasmic vesicle membrane; cytoplasmic vesicle; nucleus
Biological process	homologous chromosome movement towards spindle pole in meiosis I anaphase; establishment of meiotic spindle localization; intracellular signal transduction; polar body extrusion after meiotic divisions; negative regulation of protein catabolic process; meiotic chromosome movement towards spindle pole; negative regulation of apoptotic process; intracellular transport; actin filament bundle assembly; cellular response to DNA damage stimulus; oogenesis; multicellular organism development; protein transport; formin-nucleated actin cable assembly; cellular response to hypoxia; vesicle-mediated transport; positive regulation of double-strand break repair; positive regulation of actin nucleation
Sources:Amigo / QuickGO
Orthologs
Databases	NCBI: entry; OMA: entry
Species	Human	Mouse
Entrez	56776	54418
Ensembl	ENSG00000155816	ENSMUSG00000028354
UniProt	Q9NZ56	Q9JL04
RefSeq (mRNA)	NM_001305424; NM_020066; NM_001348094	NM_019445
RefSeq (protein)	NP_001292353; NP_064450; NP_001335023	NP_062318
Location (UCSC)	Chr 1: 240.01 – 240.48 Mb	Chr 1: 174.33 – 174.65 Mb
PubMed search
- Wikidata
View/Edit Human	View/Edit Mouse

Formin-2 (FMN2) is an actin binding structural protein and has a localized expression pattern in the developing and adult forms of the central nervous system (CNS). FMN2 plays an important role in the nucleation and assembly of actin filaments. In humans, this gene is located on Chromosome 1.

FMN2 plays a role in the ability of neurons to migrate and innervate target tissues. FMN2 is present in the filopodial tips of neuronal growth cones and influences its pathfinding ability. In chicks FMN2 plays a role in migration of spinal commissural neurons. FMN2 is reported to act like a clutch molecule generating traction to join the actin cytoskeleton to the growth cone.

Biallelic mutations in this gene have been associated with Nonsyndromic Autosomal Recessive Intellectual Disability.

FMN2 double knockout mice are seen to be normal in gross and microscopic morphology of the brain but show decreased fertility, improper positioning of the metaphase spindle and problems in the polar body formation during oogenesis.
