= FMNL1 =

Protein-coding gene in the species Homo sapiens

Identifiers
- Aliases: FMNL1, C17orf1, C17orf1B, FHOD4, FMNL, KW-13, formin like 1
- External IDs: OMIM: 604656; MGI: 1888994; GeneCards: FMNL1
Available structures
PDB	Ortholog search: PDBe RCSB
PDB	List of PDB id codes 4YDH

Gene location (Human)
Chr.	Chromosome 17 (human)
Band	17q21.31	Start	45,221,444 bp
Band	17q21.31	End	45,247,319 bp

Gene location (Mouse)
Chr.	Chromosome 11 (mouse)
Band	11|11 E1	Start	103,061,933 bp
Band	11|11 E1	End	103,089,727 bp
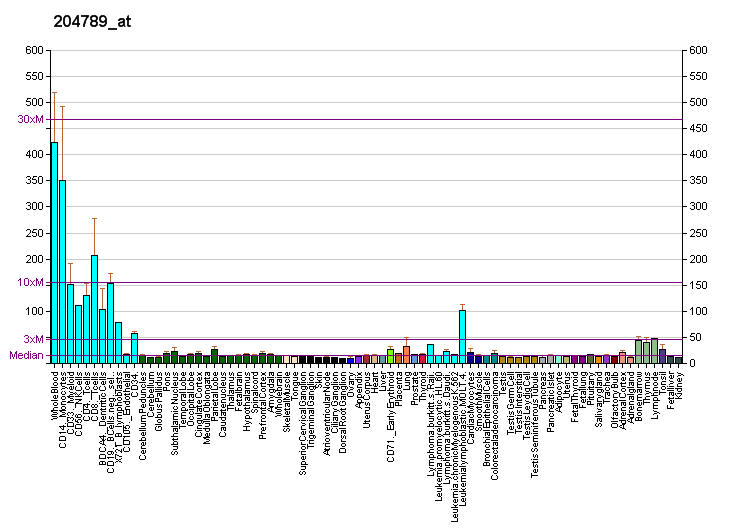
RNA expression pattern
Bgee	Human / Mouse (ortholog); Top expressed in: granulocyte; monocyte; blood; spleen; right lung; upper lobe of left lung; lymph node; bone marrow cell; appendix; gallbladder / Top expressed in: granulocyte; primary visual cortex; superior frontal gyrus; dentate gyrus of hippocampal formation granule cell; perirhinal cortex; tibiofemoral joint; thymus; entorhinal cortex; lumbar spinal ganglion; interventricular septum; More reference expression data
BioGPS	More reference expression data
Gene ontology
Molecular function	profilin binding; GTPase activating protein binding; actin filament binding; protein binding; actin binding; molecular function
Cellular component	cytoplasm; cell projection; membrane; plasma membrane; cell cortex; phagocytic vesicle; bleb; extracellular exosome; cytoplasmic vesicle; cytosol; integral component of membrane
Biological process	actin filament severing; substrate-dependent cell migration; cytoskeleton organization; regulation of cell shape; cellular component organization; cortical actin cytoskeleton organization; actin cytoskeleton organization; cellular process or phenomenon
Sources:Amigo / QuickGO
Orthologs
Databases	NCBI: entry; OMA: entry
Species	Human	Mouse
Entrez	752	57778
Ensembl	ENSG00000184922	ENSMUSG00000055805
UniProt	O95466	Q9JL26
RefSeq (mRNA)	NM_005892	NM_001077698; NM_019679
RefSeq (protein)	NP_005883	NP_001071166; NP_062653; NP_001390541; NP_001390542; NP_001390543 NP_001390544; NP_001390545; NP_001390546; NP_001390547
Location (UCSC)	Chr 17: 45.22 – 45.25 Mb	Chr 11: 103.06 – 103.09 Mb
PubMed search
- Wikidata
View/Edit Human	View/Edit Mouse

Formin-like protein 1 is a protein that in humans is encoded by the FMNL1 gene.

This gene encodes a formin-related protein. Formin-related proteins have been implicated in morphogenesis, cytokinesis, and cell polarity. An alternative splice variant has been described but its full length sequence has not been determined.

== Interactions ==
FMNL1 has been shown to interact with Profilin 1, PFN2 and RAC1.

== See also ==
- FMNL2
- FMNL3
