= MTSS1 =

Protein-coding gene in the species Homo sapiens

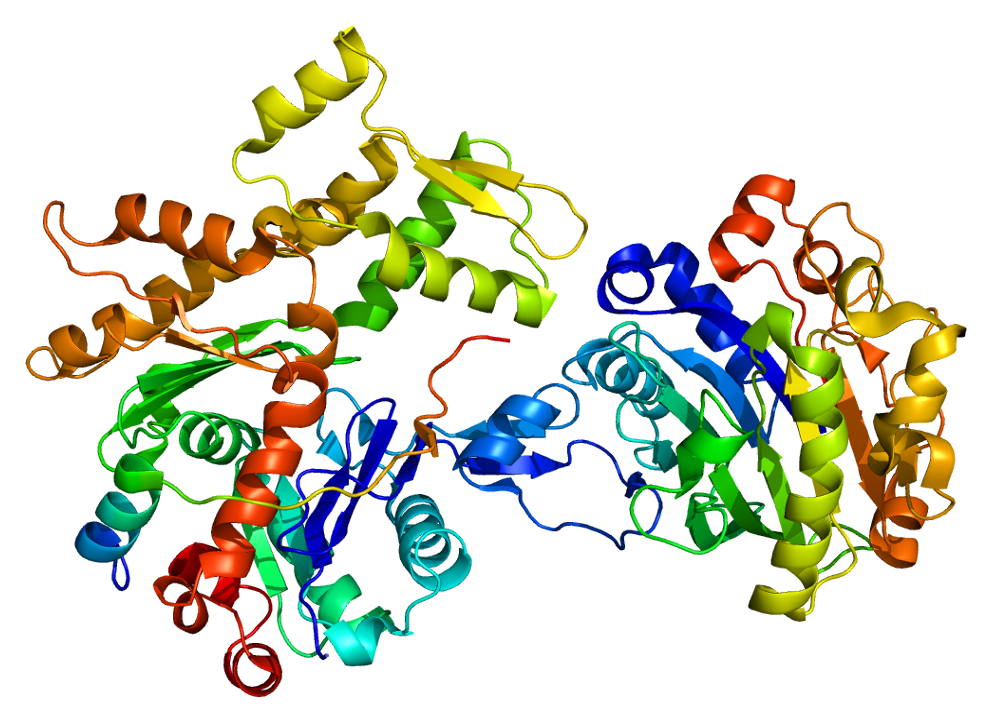

Identifiers
- Aliases: MTSS1, MIM, MIMA, MIMB, metastasis suppressor 1, I-BAR domain containing, MTSS I-BAR domain containing 1
- External IDs: OMIM: 608486; MGI: 2384818; GeneCards: MTSS1
Available structures
PDB	Ortholog search: PDBe RCSB
PDB	List of PDB id codes 2D1K

Gene location (Human)
Chr.	Chromosome 8 (human)
Band	8q24.13	Start	124,550,784 bp
Band	8q24.13	End	124,728,473 bp

Gene location (Mouse)
Chr.	Chromosome 15 (mouse)
Band	15|15 D1	Start	58,813,083 bp
Band	15|15 D1	End	58,953,854 bp
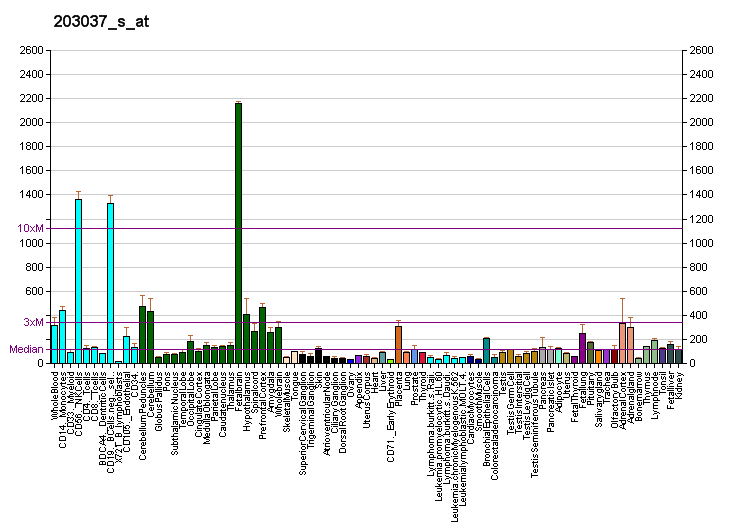

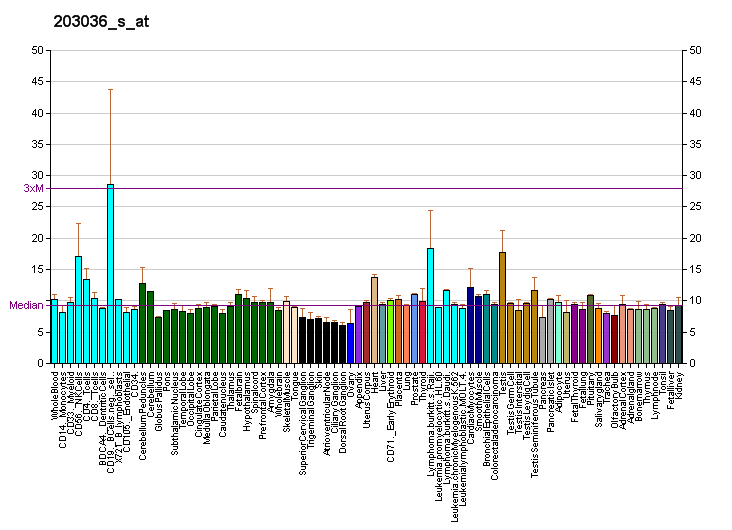

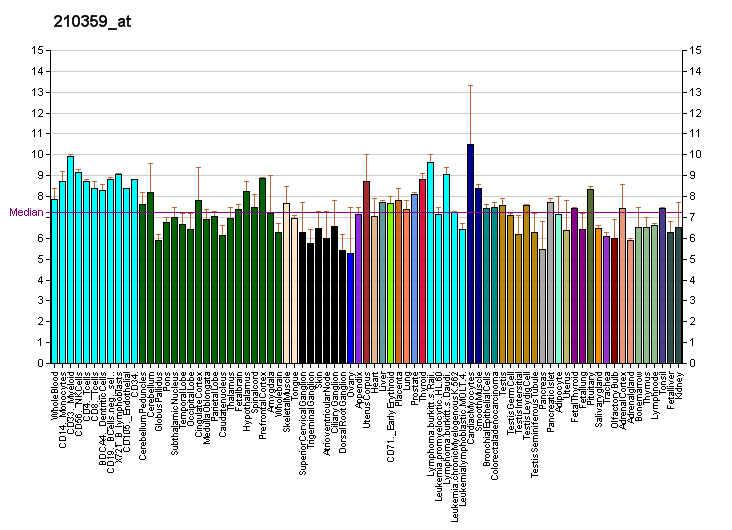
RNA expression pattern
Bgee	Human / Mouse (ortholog); Top expressed in: retinal pigment epithelium; glomerulus; metanephric glomerulus; hair follicle; subthalamic nucleus; renal medulla; skin of hip; inferior ganglion of vagus nerve; skin of thigh; bronchial epithelial cell / Top expressed in: lobe of cerebellum; cerebellar vermis; Rostral migratory stream; vestibular membrane of cochlear duct; stroma of bone marrow; zygote; habenula; secondary oocyte; pineal gland; iris; More reference expression data
BioGPS	More reference expression data
Gene ontology
Molecular function	actin monomer binding; protein binding; identical protein binding; actin binding; signaling receptor binding
Cellular component	cytoplasm; ruffle; endocytic vesicle; actin cytoskeleton; cytoskeleton
Biological process	renal tubule morphogenesis; nephron tubule epithelial cell differentiation; transmembrane receptor protein tyrosine kinase signaling pathway; cellular response to fluid shear stress; cell adhesion; epithelial cell proliferation involved in renal tubule morphogenesis; microspike assembly; negative regulation of epithelial cell proliferation; plasma membrane organization; actin cytoskeleton organization; glomerulus morphogenesis
Sources:Amigo / QuickGO
Orthologs
Databases	NCBI: entry; OMA: entry
Species	Human	Mouse
Entrez	9788	211401
Ensembl	ENSG00000170873	ENSMUSG00000022353
UniProt	O43312	Q8R1S4
RefSeq (mRNA)	NM_001282971; NM_001282974; NM_014751; NM_001363294; NM_001363295 NM_001363296; NM_001363297; NM_001363298; NM_001363299; NM_001363300; NM_001363301; NM_001363302	NM_001146180; NM_144800
RefSeq (protein)	NP_001269900; NP_001269903; NP_055566; NP_001350223; NP_001350224 NP_001350225; NP_001350226; NP_001350227; NP_001350228; NP_001350229; NP_001350230; NP_001350231	NP_001139652; NP_659049; NP_001390427; NP_001390428; NP_001390429 NP_001390430; NP_001390431; NP_001390432; NP_001390433; NP_001390434; NP_001390435; NP_001390436
Location (UCSC)	Chr 8: 124.55 – 124.73 Mb	Chr 15: 58.81 – 58.95 Mb
PubMed search
- Wikidata
View/Edit Human	View/Edit Mouse

Metastasis suppressor protein 1 is a protein that in humans is encoded by the MTSS1 gene. True to its name, it codes for a metastasis suppressor.
