= WIPF2 =

Protein-coding gene in humans

Identifiers
- Aliases: WIPF2, WICH, WIRE, WAS/WASL interacting protein family member 2
- External IDs: OMIM: 609692; MGI: 1924462; HomoloGene: 15777; GeneCards: WIPF2; OMA:WIPF2 - orthologs

Gene location (Human)
Chr.	Chromosome 17 (human)
Band	17q21.2	Start	40,219,304 bp
Band	17q21.2	End	40,284,136 bp

Gene location (Mouse)
Chr.	Chromosome 11 (mouse)
Band	11|11 D	Start	98,754,464 bp
Band	11|11 D	End	98,795,866 bp
RNA expression pattern
Bgee	Human / Mouse (ortholog); Top expressed in: secondary oocyte; buccal mucosa cell; frontal pole; lower lobe of lung; nipple; Brodmann area 46; internal globus pallidus; Brodmann area 10; optic nerve; paraflocculus of cerebellum / Top expressed in: transitional epithelium of urinary bladder; genital tubercle; subiculum; superior colliculus; ventral tegmental area; tail of embryo; central gray substance of midbrain; medial geniculate nucleus; Region I of hippocampus proper; dorsomedial hypothalamic nucleus; More reference expression data
BioGPS	n/a
Gene ontology
Molecular function	actin binding; protein binding; actin filament binding
Cellular component	cytoplasm; cytosol; cytoskeleton; nucleoplasm; plasma membrane; actin filament; actin cortical patch
Biological process	Fc-gamma receptor signaling pathway involved in phagocytosis; actin cortical patch assembly; endocytosis; actin filament-based movement; positive regulation of actin nucleation; actin cortical patch localization
Sources:Amigo / QuickGO
Orthologs
Species	Human	Mouse
Entrez	147179	68524
Ensembl	ENSG00000171475	ENSMUSG00000038013
UniProt	Q8TF74	Q6PEV3
RefSeq (mRNA)	NM_133264	NM_197940
RefSeq (protein)	NP_573571	NP_922922
Location (UCSC)	Chr 17: 40.22 – 40.28 Mb	Chr 11: 98.75 – 98.8 Mb
PubMed search
- Wikidata
View/Edit Human	View/Edit Mouse

WAS/WASL-interacting protein family member 2 is a protein that in humans is encoded by the WIPF2 gene.

This gene encodes a WASP interacting protein (WIP)-related protein. It has been shown that this protein has a role in the WASP-mediated organization of the actin cytoskeleton and that this protein is a potential link between the activated platelet-derived growth factor receptor and the actin polymerization machinery.
