= WASF1 =

Identifiers
- Aliases: WASF1, SCAR1, WAVE, WAVE1, WAS protein family member 1, WASP family member 1, NEDALVS
- External IDs: OMIM: 605035; MGI: 1890563; GeneCards: WASF1
Available structures
PDB	Ortholog search: PDBe RCSB
PDB	List of PDB id codes 3P8C, 4N78

Gene location (Human)
Chr.	Chromosome 6 (human)
Band	6q21	Start	110,099,819 bp
Band	6q21	End	110,180,004 bp

Gene location (Mouse)
Chr.	Chromosome 10 (mouse)
Band	10 B1|10 22.07 cM	Start	40,759,471 bp
Band	10 B1|10 22.07 cM	End	40,814,566 bp
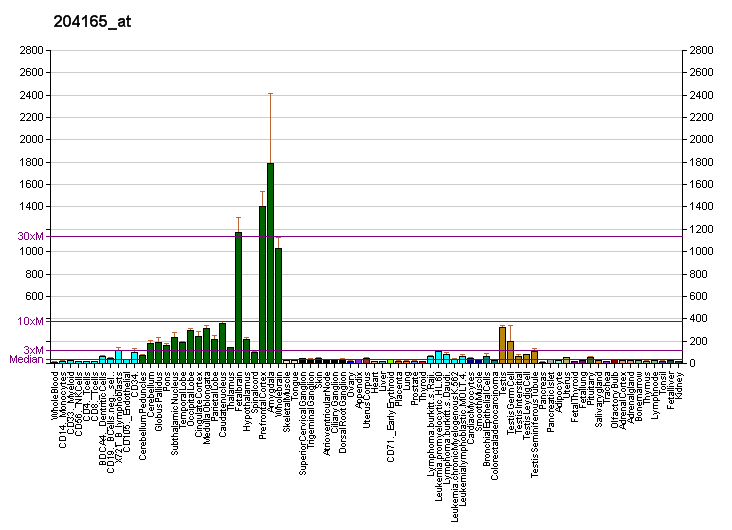
RNA expression pattern
Bgee	Human / Mouse (ortholog); Top expressed in: Region I of hippocampus proper; Brodmann area 23; orbitofrontal cortex; superior frontal gyrus; postcentral gyrus; entorhinal cortex; primary visual cortex; middle temporal gyrus; prefrontal cortex; Brodmann area 9 / Top expressed in: piriform cortex; olfactory tubercle; subiculum; subdivision of hippocampus; hippocampus proper; Region I of hippocampus proper; temporal lobe; dentate gyrus; amygdala; nucleus accumbens; More reference expression data
BioGPS	More reference expression data
Gene ontology
Molecular function	actin binding; protein binding; protein kinase A binding; protein-containing complex binding
Cellular component	cytoplasm; mitochondrial outer membrane; cell junction; synapse; cytoskeleton; mitochondrion; SCAR complex; lamellipodium; focal adhesion; actin cytoskeleton; protein-containing complex; dendrite cytoplasm; postsynapse
Biological process	actin filament polymerization; Rac protein signal transduction; positive regulation of Arp2/3 complex-mediated actin nucleation; lamellipodium morphogenesis; actin cytoskeleton organization; neuron projection development; positive regulation of neurotrophin TRK receptor signaling pathway; dendrite extension; receptor-mediated endocytosis; cellular response to brain-derived neurotrophic factor stimulus; protein-containing complex assembly; modification of postsynaptic actin cytoskeleton; dendritic transport of mitochondrion
Sources:Amigo / QuickGO
Orthologs
Databases	NCBI: entry; OMA: entry
Species	Human	Mouse
Entrez	8936	83767
Ensembl	ENSG00000112290	ENSMUSG00000019831
UniProt	Q92558	Q8R5H6
RefSeq (mRNA)	NM_001024934; NM_001024935; NM_001024936; NM_003931	NM_031877; NM_001379453; NM_001379454
RefSeq (protein)	NP_001020105; NP_001020106; NP_001020107; NP_003922	NP_114083; NP_001366382; NP_001366383
Location (UCSC)	Chr 6: 110.1 – 110.18 Mb	Chr 10: 40.76 – 40.81 Mb
PubMed search
- Wikidata
View/Edit Human	View/Edit Mouse

Wiskott–Aldrich syndrome protein family member 1, also known as WASP-family verprolin homologous protein 1 (WAVE1), is a protein that in humans is encoded by the WASF1 gene.

== Function ==
The protein encoded by this gene, a member of the Wiskott–Aldrich syndrome protein (WASP) family, plays a critical role downstream of Rac, a Rho-family small GTPase, through its involvement in the WAVE regulatory complex in regulating the actin cytoskeleton required for membrane ruffling. It has been shown to associate with an actin nucleation core Arp2/3 complex while enhancing actin polymerization in vitro.

== Clinical significance ==
Wiskott–Aldrich syndrome is a disease of the immune system, likely due to defects in regulation of actin cytoskeleton.

== Interactions ==
WASF1 has been shown to interact with BAIAP2 and Profilin 1.
