= Junction-mediating and regulatory protein =

JMY

Identifiers
- Aliases: JMY, WHDC1L3, WHAMM2, junction mediating and regulatory protein, p53 cofactor
- External IDs: OMIM: 604279; MGI: 1913096; GeneCards: JMY

Gene location (Human)
Chr.	Chromosome 5 (human)
Band	5q14.1	Start	79,236,131 bp
Band	5q14.1	End	79,327,211 bp

Gene location (Mouse)
Chr.	Chromosome 13 (mouse)
Band	13|13 C3	Start	93,566,609 bp
Band	13|13 C3	End	93,636,316 bp
RNA expression pattern
Bgee	Human / Mouse (ortholog); Top expressed in: endothelial cell; sperm; oocyte; pancreatic epithelial cell; Brodmann area 23; tibialis anterior muscle; cartilage tissue; skin of thigh; secondary oocyte; visceral pleura / Top expressed in: cumulus cell; myocardium of ventricle; extraocular muscle; pineal gland; digastric muscle; atrioventricular valve; temporal muscle; triceps brachii muscle; skin of back; hair follicle; More reference expression data
BioGPS	n/a
Gene ontology
Molecular function	actin binding; protein binding; transcription coactivator activity; Arp2/3 complex binding
Cellular component	cytoskeleton; cell leading edge; nucleoplasm; nucleus; cytoplasm
Biological process	actin polymerization-dependent cell motility; DNA repair; cellular response to DNA damage stimulus; regulation of transcription by RNA polymerase II; regulation of signal transduction by p53 class mediator; Arp2/3 complex-mediated actin nucleation; positive regulation of apoptotic process; positive regulation of DNA-binding transcription factor activity; 'de novo' actin filament nucleation; intrinsic apoptotic signaling pathway by p53 class mediator; positive regulation of nucleic acid-templated transcription
Sources:Amigo / QuickGO
Orthologs
Databases	NCBI: entry; OMA: entry
Species	Human	Mouse
Entrez	133746	57748
Ensembl	ENSG00000152409	ENSMUSG00000021690
UniProt	Q8N9B5	Q9QXM1
RefSeq (mRNA)	NM_152405	NM_021310
RefSeq (protein)	NP_689618	NP_067285
Location (UCSC)	Chr 5: 79.24 – 79.33 Mb	Chr 13: 93.57 – 93.64 Mb
PubMed search
- Wikidata
View/Edit Human	View/Edit Mouse

Junction-mediating and regulatory protein, or JMY, is a protein in humans that is encoded by the gene JMY. It is a 110 kDa protein that interacts with p300 and has a role in regulating p53 activity. Additionally, JMY is a member of the WASp family of actin nucleators.
