= WASF2 =

Mammalian protein found in humans

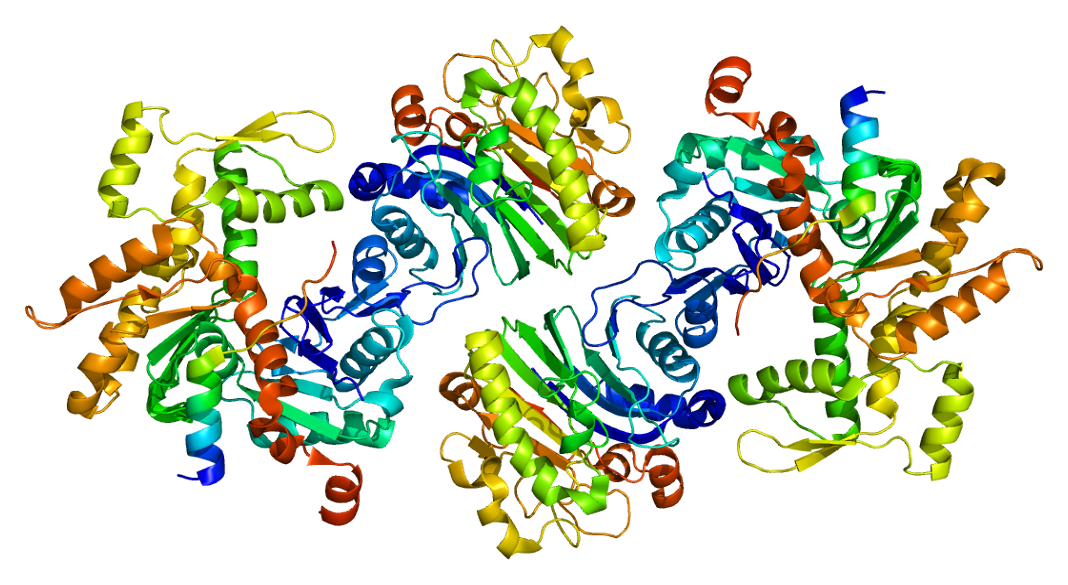

Identifiers
- Aliases: WASF2, IMD2, SCAR2, WASF4, WAVE2, dJ393P12.2, WAS protein family member 2, WASP family member 2
- External IDs: OMIM: 605875; MGI: 1098641; GeneCards: WASF2
Available structures
| PDB | Ortholog search: PDBe RCSB |
| PDB | List of PDB id codes 2A40 |

Gene location (Human)
| Chr. | Chromosome 1 (human) |
| Band | 1p36.11 | Start | 27,404,230 bp |
| Band | 1p36.11 | End | 27,490,167 bp |

Gene location (Mouse)
| Chr. | Chromosome 4 (mouse) |
| Band | 4 D2.3|4 66.22 cM | Start | 132,857,816 bp |
| Band | 4 D2.3|4 66.22 cM | End | 132,927,067 bp |
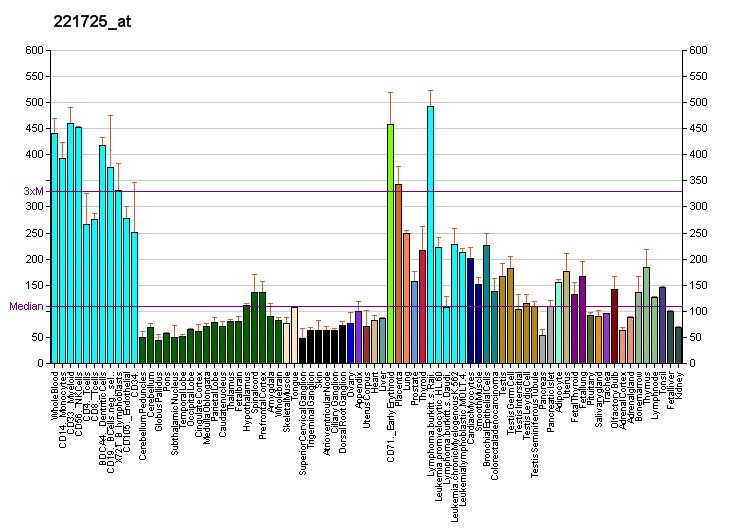
RNA expression pattern
| Bgee | Human / Mouse (ortholog); Top expressed in: nipple; skin of arm; tendon of biceps brachii; saphenous vein; pylorus; lower lobe of lung; cardia; mucosa of pharynx; trachea; lactiferous duct / Top expressed in: zygote; left lung lobe; tibiofemoral joint; secondary oocyte; vas deferens; gastrula; Gonadal ridge; mesenteric lymph nodes; submandibular gland; decidua; More reference expression data |
| BioGPS | More reference expression data |
Gene ontology
| Molecular function | protein-containing complex binding; protein binding; actin binding; SH3 domain binding; cadherin binding; protein kinase A binding |
| Cellular component | cytoplasm; cytosol; cell projection; SCAR complex; cell-cell junction; ruffle; intracellular anatomical structure; early endosome; actin cytoskeleton; extracellular exosome; cytoskeleton; lamellipodium; protein-containing complex; synapse |
| Biological process | megakaryocyte development; endocytosis; Fc-gamma receptor signaling pathway involved in phagocytosis; adenylate cyclase-modulating G protein-coupled receptor signaling pathway; actin filament-based movement; vascular endothelial growth factor receptor signaling pathway; angiogenesis; Rac protein signal transduction; viral process; positive regulation of lamellipodium assembly; negative regulation of stress fiber assembly; ameboidal-type cell migration; lamellipodium morphogenesis; actin cytoskeleton organization; lamellipodium assembly; postsynaptic actin cytoskeleton organization |
Sources:Amigo / QuickGO
Orthologs
| Databases | NCBI: entry; OMA: entry |
| Species | Human | Mouse |
| Entrez | 10163 | 242687 |
| Ensembl | ENSG00000158195 | ENSMUSG00000028868 |
| UniProt | Q9Y6W5 | Q8BH43 |
| RefSeq (mRNA) | NM_006990; NM_001201404 | NM_153423 |
| RefSeq (protein) | NP_001188333; NP_008921 | NP_700472 |
| Location (UCSC) | Chr 1: 27.4 – 27.49 Mb | Chr 4: 132.86 – 132.93 Mb |
| PubMed search |
- Wikidata
| View/Edit Human | View/Edit Mouse |

Wiskott–Aldrich syndrome protein family member 2 is a protein that in humans is encoded by the WASF2 gene.

This gene encodes a member of the Wiskott–Aldrich syndrome protein family. The gene product is a protein that forms a multiprotein complex that links receptor kinases and actin. Binding to actin occurs through a C-terminal verprolin homology domain in all family members. The multiprotein complex serves to tranduce signals that involve changes in cell shape, motility or function. The published map location has been changed based on recent genomic sequence comparisons, which indicate that the expressed gene is located on chromosome 1, and a pseudogene may be located on chromosome X.

== Interactions ==
WASF2 has been shown to interact with BAIAP2.
