= Pleckstrin homology domain =

Protein domain

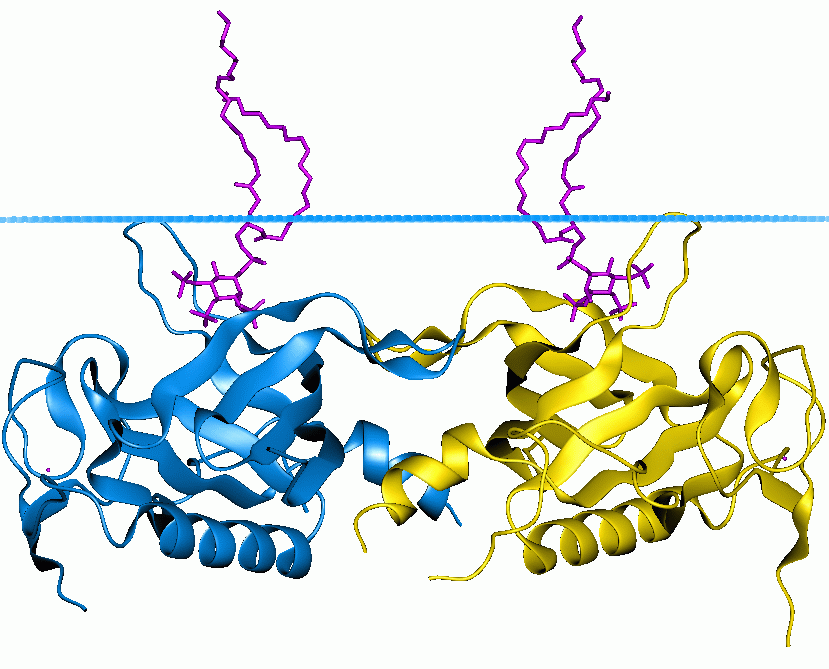
- PH domain of tyrosine-protein kinase BTK

Identifiers
- Symbol: PH
- Pfam: PF00169
- Pfam clan: CL0266
- ECOD: 220.1.1
- InterPro: IPR001849
- SMART: PH
- PROSITE: PDOC50003
- SCOP2: 1dyn / SCOPe / SUPFAM
- OPM superfamily: 49
- OPM protein: 1pls
- CDD: cd00821
Available protein structures:
- PDB: IPR001849 PF00169 (ECOD; PDBsum)
- AlphaFold: IPR001849; PF00169

Pleckstrin homology domain (PH domain) or (PHIP) is a protein domain of approximately 120 amino acids that occurs in a wide range of proteins involved in intracellular signaling or as constituents of the cytoskeleton.

This domain can bind phosphatidylinositol lipids within biological membranes (such as phosphatidylinositol (3,4,5)-trisphosphate and phosphatidylinositol (4,5)-bisphosphate), and proteins such as the βγ-subunits of heterotrimeric G proteins, and protein kinase C. Through these interactions, PH domains play a role in recruiting proteins to different membranes, thus targeting them to appropriate cellular compartments or enabling them to interact with other components of the signal transduction pathways.

== Lipid binding specificity ==
Individual PH domains possess specificities for phosphoinositides phosphorylated at different sites within the inositol ring, e.g., some bind phosphatidylinositol (4,5)-bisphosphate but not phosphatidylinositol (3,4,5)-trisphosphate or phosphatidylinositol (3,4)-bisphosphate, while others may possess the requisite affinity. This is important because it makes the recruitment of different PH domain containing proteins sensitive to the activities of enzymes that either phosphorylate or dephosphorylate these sites on the inositol ring, such as phosphoinositide 3-kinase or PTEN, respectively. Thus, such enzymes exert a part of their effect on cell function by modulating the localization of downstream signaling proteins that possess PH domains that are capable of binding their phospholipid products.

== Structure ==
The 3D structure of several PH domains has been determined. All known cases have a common structure consisting of two perpendicular anti-parallel beta sheets, followed by a C-terminal amphipathic helix. The loops connecting the beta-strands differ greatly in length, making the PH domain relatively difficult to detect while providing the source of the domain's specificity. The only conserved residue among PH domains is a single tryptophan located within the alpha helix that serves to nucleate the core of the domain.

== Proteins containing PH domain ==
PH domains can be found in many different proteins, such as OSBP or ARF. Recruitment to the Golgi apparatus in this case is dependent on both PtdIns and ARF. A large number of PH domains have poor affinity for phosphoinositides and are hypothesized to function as protein binding domains. A Genome-wide look in Saccharomyces cerevisiae showed that most of the 33 yeast PH domains are indeed promiscuous in binding to phosphoinositides, while only one (Num1-PH) behaved highly specific . Proteins reported to contain PH domains belong to the following families:

- Pleckstrin, the protein where this domain was first detected, is the major substrate of protein kinase C in platelets. Pleckstrin contains two PH domains. ARAP proteins contain five PH domains.
- Serine/threonine-specific protein kinases such as the Akt/Rac family, protein kinase D1, and the trypanosomal NrkA family.
- Non-receptor tyrosine kinases belonging to the Btk/Itk/Tec subfamily.
- Insulin receptor substrate 1 (IRS-1).
- Regulators of small G-proteins: 64 RhoGEFs of the Dbl-like family., and several GTPase activating proteins like ABR, BCR or ARAP proteins.
- Cytoskeletal proteins such as dynamin (see InterPro: IPR001401), Caenorhabditis elegans kinesin-like protein unc-104 (see InterPro: IPR001752), spectrin beta-chain, syntrophin (2 PH domains), and S. cerevisiae nuclear migration protein NUM1.
- Oxysterol-binding proteins OSBP, S. cerevisiae OSH1 and YHR073w.
- Ceramide kinase, a lipid kinase that phosphorylates ceramides to ceramide-1-phosphate.
- G protein receptor kinases (GRK) of GRK2 subfamily (beta-adrenergic receptor kinases): GRK2 and GRK3.

== Clinical significance ==
Heterozygous loss of function mutations in the PHIP gene result in Chung-Jansen syndrome -also called PHIP-related disorder. This disorder is mainly characterized by developmental delay (DD), learning difficulties/intellectual disability (ID), behavioral abnormalities, facial dysmorphism and obesity (CHUJANS, OMIM #617991).

== Subfamilies ==
- Spectrin/pleckstrin-like InterPro: IPR001605

== Examples ==
Human genes encoding proteins containing this domain include:

- ABR, ADAP2, ADRBK1, ADRBK2, AFAP, AFAP1, AFAP1L1, AFAP1L2, AKAP13, AKT1, AKT2, AKT3, ANLN, APBB1IP, APPL1, APPL2, ARHGAP10, ARHGAP12, ARHGAP15, ARHGAP21, ARHGAP22, ARHGAP23, ARHGAP24, ARHGAP25, ARHGAP26, ARHGAP27, ARHGAP9, ARHGEF16, ARHGEF18, ARHGEF19, ARHGEF2, ARHGEF3, ARHGEF4, ARHGEF5, ARHGEF6, ARHGEF7, ARHGEF9, ASEF2,
- BMX, BTK,
- C20orf42, C9orf100, CADPS, CADPS2, CDC42BPA, CDC42BPB, CDC42BPG, CENTA1, CENTB1, CENTB2, CENTB5, CENTD1, CENTD2, CENTD3, CENTG1, CENTG2, CENTG3, CERK, CIT, CNKSR1, CNKSR2, COL4A3BP, CTGLF1, CTGLF2, CTGLF3, * CTGLF4, CTGLF5, CTGLF6,
- DAB2IP, DAPP1, ASAP1, ASAP2, DDEFL1, DEF6, DEPDC2, DGKD, DGKH, DGKK, DNM1, DNM2, DNM3, DOCK10, DOCK11, DOCK9, DOK1, DOK2, DOK3, DOK4, DOK5, DOK6, DTGCU2,
- EXOC8,
- FAM109A, FAM109B, FARP1, FARP2, FGD1, FGD2, FGD3, FGD4, FGD5, FGD6,
- GAB1, GAB2, GAB3, GAB4, GRB10, GRB14, GRB7,
- IRS1, IRS2, IRS4, ITK, ITSN1, ITSN2,
- KALRN, KIF1A, KIF1B, KIF1Bbeta,
- MCF2, MCF2L, MCF2L2, MRIP, MYO10,
- NET1, NGEF,
- OBPH1, OBSCN, OPHN1, OSBP, OSBP2, OSBPL10, OSBPL11, OSBPL3, OSBPL5, OSBPL6, OSBPL7, OSBPL8, OSBPL9,
- PHLDA2, PHLDA3, PHLDB1, PHLDB2, PHLPP, PIP3-E, PLCD1, PLCD4, PLCG1, PLCG2, PLCH1, PLCH2, PLCL1, PLCL2, PLD1, PLD2, PLEK, PLEK2, PLEKHA1, PLEKHA2, PLEKHA3, PLEKHA4, PLEKHA5, PLEKHA6, PLEKHA7, PLEKHA8, PLEKHB1, PLEKHB2, PLEKHC1, PLEKHF1, PLEKHF2, PLEKHG1, PLEKHG2, PLEKHG3, PLEKHG4, PLEKHG5, PLEKHG6, PLEKHH1, PLEKHH2, PLEKHH3, PLEKHJ1, PLEKHK1, PLEKHM1, PLEKHM2, PLEKHO1, PLEKHQ1, PREX1, PRKCN, PRKD1, PRKD2, PRKD3, PSCD1, PSCD2, PSCD3, PSCD4, PSD, PSD2, PSD3, PSD4, RALGPS1, RALGPS2, RAPH1,
- RASA1, RASA2, RASA3, RASA4, RASAL1, RASGRF1, RGNEF, ROCK1, ROCK2, RTKN,
- SBF1, SBF2, SCAP2, SGEF, SH2B, SH2B1, SH2B2, SH2B3, SH3BP2, SKAP1, SKAP2, SNTA1, SNTB1, SNTB2, SOS1, SOS2, SPATA13, SPNB4, SPTBN1, SPTBN2, SPTBN4, SPTBN5, STAP1, SWAP70, SYNGAP1,
- TBC1D2, TEC, TIAM1, TRIO, TRIOBP, TYL,
- URP1, URP2,
- VAV1, VAV2, VAV3, VEPH1

== See also ==
- Pleckstrin
- The unrelated FYVE domain binds Phosphatidylinositol 3-phosphate and has been found in over 60 proteins.
- The GRAM domain is a structurally related protein domain.
