= CYTH4 =

Protein-coding gene in the species Homo sapiens

Identifiers
- Aliases: CYTH4, CYT4, DJ63G5.1, PSCD4, cytohesin 4, cytohesin-4
- External IDs: OMIM: 606514; MGI: 2441702; GeneCards: CYTH4

Gene location (Human)
| Chr. | Chromosome 22 (human) |
| Band | 22q13.1 | Start | 37,282,027 bp |
| Band | 22q13.1 | End | 37,315,341 bp |

Gene location (Mouse)
| Chr. | Chromosome 15 (mouse) |
| Band | 15|15 E1 | Start | 78,597,047 bp |
| Band | 15|15 E1 | End | 78,622,019 bp |
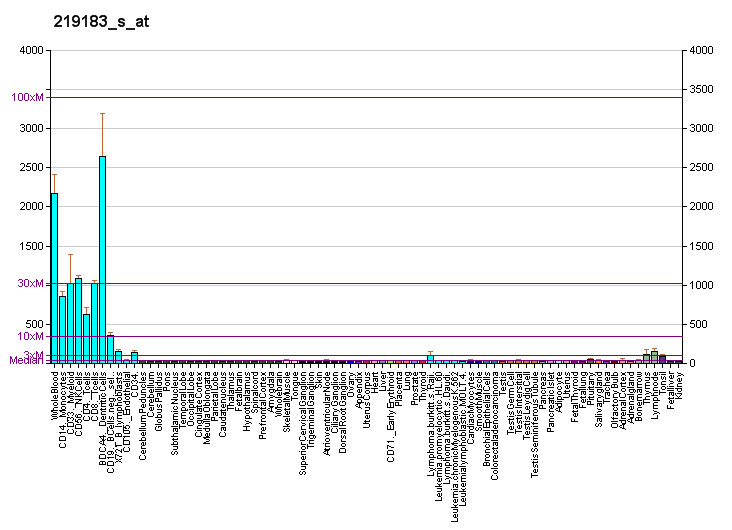

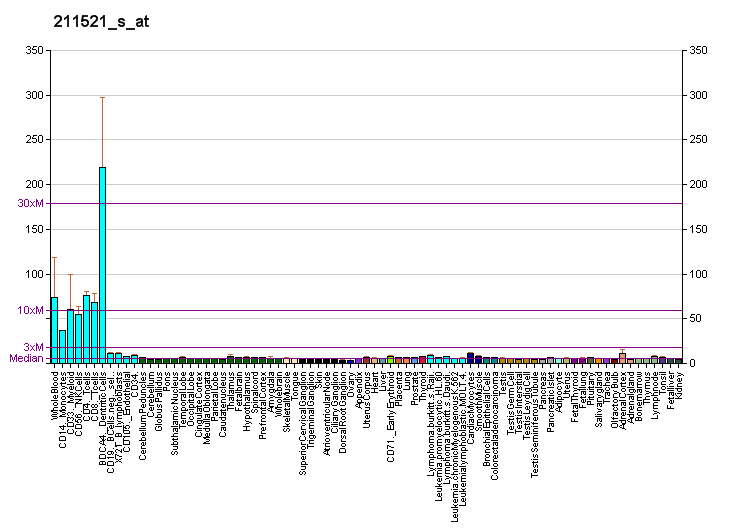
RNA expression pattern
| Bgee | Human / Mouse (ortholog); Top expressed in: granulocyte; monocyte; blood; spleen; appendix; lymph node; periodontal fiber; bone marrow cell; gallbladder; right coronary artery / Top expressed in: granulocyte; mesenteric lymph nodes; stroma of bone marrow; spleen; subcutaneous adipose tissue; blood; superior frontal gyrus; thymus; dentate gyrus of hippocampal formation granule cell; body of femur; More reference expression data |
| BioGPS | More reference expression data |
Gene ontology
| Molecular function | guanyl-nucleotide exchange factor activity; lipid binding |
| Cellular component | plasma membrane; membrane; Golgi membrane; cytosol |
| Biological process | regulation of ARF protein signal transduction |
Sources:Amigo / QuickGO
Orthologs
| Databases | NCBI: entry; OMA: entry |
| Species | Human | Mouse |
| Entrez | 27128 | 72318 |
| Ensembl | ENSG00000100055 | ENSMUSG00000018008 |
| UniProt | Q9UIA0 | Q80YW0 |
| RefSeq (mRNA) | NM_013385; NM_001318024 | NM_028195 |
| RefSeq (protein) | NP_001304953; NP_037517 | NP_082471 |
| Location (UCSC) | Chr 22: 37.28 – 37.32 Mb | Chr 15: 78.6 – 78.62 Mb |
| PubMed search |
- Wikidata
| View/Edit Human | View/Edit Mouse |

Cytohesin-4 is a protein that in humans is encoded by the CYTH4 gene.

This gene encodes a member of the cytohesin (CYTH) family, formerly known as the PSCD (pleckstrin homology, Sec7 and coiled-coil domains) family. Members of this family have identical structural organization that consists of an N-terminal coiled-coil motif, a central Sec7 domain, and a C-terminal pleckstrin homology (PH) domain. The coiled-coil motif is involved in homodimerization, the Sec7 domain contains guanine-nucleotide exchange protein (GEP) activity, and the PH domain interacts with phospholipids and is responsible for association of CYTHs with membranes. Members of this family appear to mediate the regulation of protein sorting and membrane trafficking. CYTH4 exhibits GEP activity in vitro with both ARF1 and ARF5 but is inactive with ARF6. The CYTH4 and CYTH1 gene structures are very similar.
