= RIAM =

Riam or RIAM might refer to:

- APBB1IP, a protein
- Chao Chom Manda Riam (1770–1837), royal concubine of King Buddha Loetla Nabhalai of Siam
- Halam tribe, or Riam, various tribes native to Tripura, India
- Riom, a village in the Puy-de-Dôme department of France
- Riverside International Automotive Museum, a defunct automotive museum in Riverside, California, U.S.
- Royal Irish Academy of Music
