= TMEM82 =

Transmembrane Protein 82

Identifiers
- Aliases: TMEM82, transmembrane protein 82
- External IDs: MGI: 2384869; HomoloGene: 27088; GeneCards: TMEM82; OMA:TMEM82 - orthologs

Gene location (Human)
Chr.	Chromosome 1 (human)
Band	1p36.21	Start	15,742,499 bp
Band	1p36.21	End	15,747,982 bp

Gene location (Mouse)
Chr.	Chromosome 4 (mouse)
Band	4|4 D3	Start	141,340,687 bp
Band	4|4 D3	End	141,345,944 bp
RNA expression pattern
Bgee	Human / Mouse (ortholog); Top expressed in: right lobe of liver; duodenum; mucosa of transverse colon; human kidney; ascending aorta; Descending thoracic aorta; right coronary artery; gonad; renal cortex; rectum / Top expressed in: right kidney; yolk sac; duodenum; proximal tubule; left lobe of liver; ileum; jejunum; blastocyst; ascending aorta; human kidney; More reference expression data
BioGPS	n/a
Orthologs
Species	Human	Mouse
Entrez	388595	213989
Ensembl	ENSG00000162460	ENSMUSG00000043085
UniProt	A0PJX8	Q8R115
RefSeq (mRNA)	NM_001013641	NM_145987
RefSeq (protein)	NP_001013663	NP_666099
Location (UCSC)	Chr 1: 15.74 – 15.75 Mb	Chr 4: 141.34 – 141.35 Mb
PubMed search
- Wikidata
View/Edit Human	View/Edit Mouse

Transmembrane protein 82 (TMEM82) is a protein encoded by the TMEM82 gene in humans.

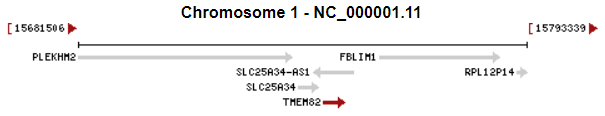
TMEM82 Gene Neighborhood

== Gene ==
The TMEM82 gene is found on chromosome 1 (1p36.21) from 15,742,499 to 15,747,982, spanning 5,484 base pairs. It is found on the plus strand and has 6 exons and 5 introns. The SLC25A34 gene is found on TMEM82's antisense strand and ecodes for a mitochondrial carrier protein.

There are a few known genetic variants which alter the molecular phenotype. One is an intergenic mutation that results in a protein product that is associated with Troponin-T. A SNP (T/C, missense) with an allele frequency of about 4% results in a protein product that is associated with Insulin-Like Growth Factor Binding Protein 3, although with a very small effect size.

== mRNA ==
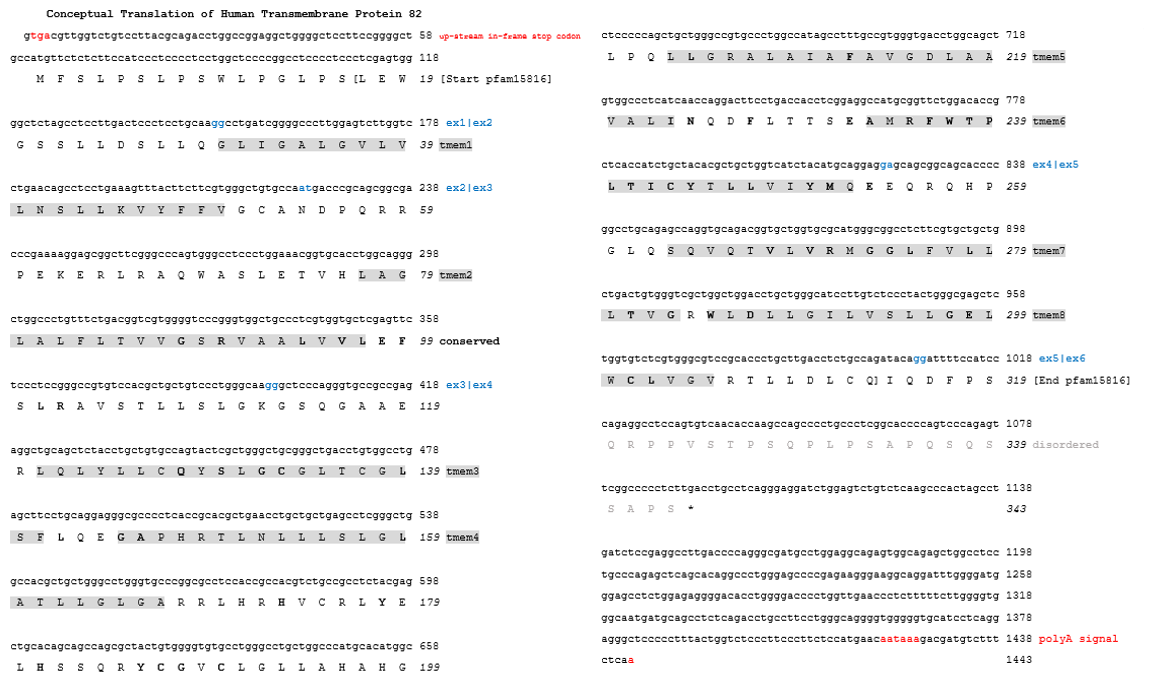
Conceptual translation of human TMEM82 mRNA into precursor protein

There human mRNA transcript for TMEM82, of which there are no isoforms, has 1,443 nucleotides which encodes a 343 amino acid long precursor protein of about 37kDa including 8 predicted transmembrane domains and 1 disordered region.

=== Expression ===
In humans, the RNA transcript is expressed highly in the kidney, liver, small intestine, and duodenum and is also expressed in the colon and stomach. Single cell RNA-seq data indicate several tissue specific cell types with enhanced TMEM82 expression in the stomach, colon, kidney, and liver: these cell types include parietal cells, chief cells, gastric mucous cells, mitotic cells, and gastric enteroendochrine cells in the stomach, colon enterocytes in the colon, proximal tubular cells in the kidney, and hepatocytes in the liver. During fetal development it is also expressed in adrenal and heart tissues and becomes highly expressed in the small intestine by 15 weeks of gestation. Its expression cluster is similar to those for genes involved in lipid metabolism. There are several similar mouse polyclonal antibodies, some rabbit polyclonal antibodies, and a couple monoclonal options for available for the TMEM82 protein but with limited evidence for efficacy.

== Protein ==
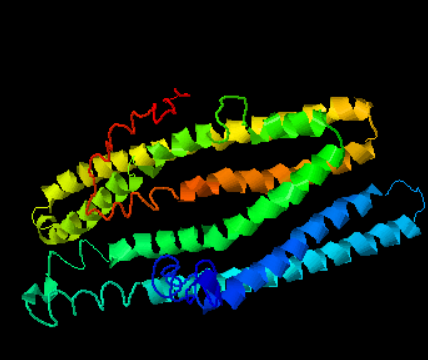
Predicted Human TMEM82 Tertiary Structure

TMEM82 is listed as pfam15816 for conserved protein domains and is the only member of the superfamily cl24398. TMEM82 is predicted to be an endoplasmic reticulum transmembrane protein. The theoretical isoelectric point of human TMEM82 is 8.57 and it is compositionally 23% leucine.

=== Post-translational modifications ===
Predicted PTMs of human TMEM82 include phosphorylation, a glycosaminoglcan attachment site, and N-myristoylation.

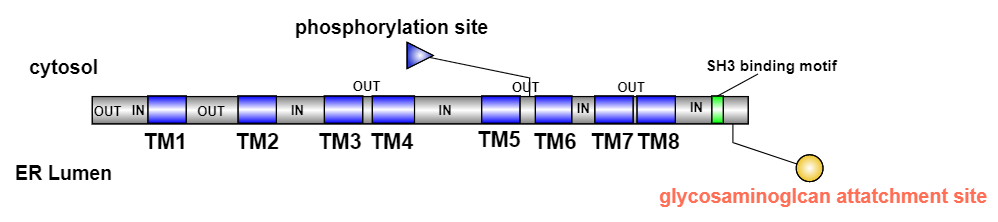
Human TMEM82 Schematic Diagram with some predicted PTMs

=== Function ===
Predicted interaction partners include APOA2 and CYP4F2. TMEM82 has been found to coexpress with proteins involved in lipids, hormones, and xenobiotic and alcohol metabolic pathways; as such, it is hypothesized to function in metabolism.

== Homologs ==
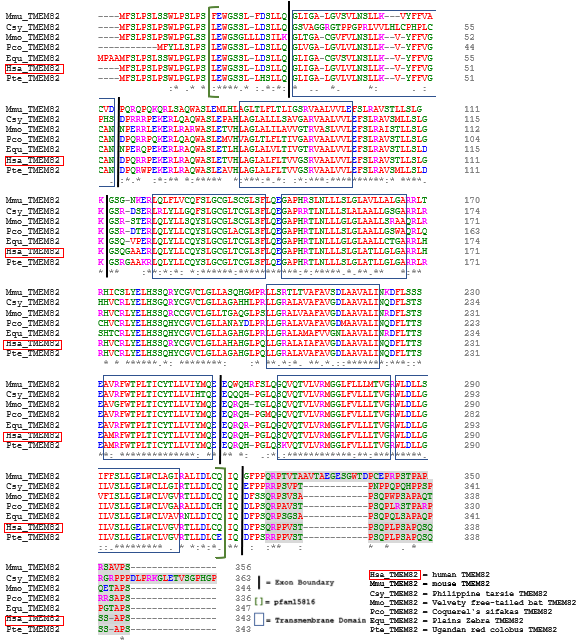
Multiple Sequence Alignment of TMEM82 Orthologs in Mammals

Orthologs of the TMEM82 gene have been identified in 442 organisms including in the chimpanzee, Rhesus monkey, dog, cow, mouse, chicken, zebrafish, and frog and is highly conserved in mammals. TMEM82 is not found in plants or fungi. There are no paralogs of TMEM82 in humans. The end of TMEM82 encompassing its disordered region is the least evolutionarilty constrained relative to the rest of the protein. The following table lists some orthologs and their attributes of TMEM82.

Table of TMEM82 Orthologs and Similarity to human TMEM82
	Genus/Species	Common Name	Taxonomic Order	Median Date of Divergence (Mya)	Accession Number	Sequence Length	Sequence Identity	Sequence Similarity
Mammal	Homo Sapiens	human	Primate	0	NP_001013663.1	343	100%	100%
Mammal	Carlito syrichta	Philippine tarsie	Primate	69	XP_008056317.1	363	73.9	79.8
Mammal	Mus Musculus	House mouse	Rodentia	87	NP_666099.2	356	76.8	84.6
Mammal	Equus quagga	Plains zebra	Perissodactyla	94	XP_046518653.1	347	86.5	90.2
Bird	Molossus molossus	velvety free-tailed bat	Chiroptera	94	XP_036113249.1	344	84.6	90.1
Bird	Aquila chrysaetos chrysaetos	volden eagle	Accipitriformes	319	XP_029872457.1	328	64.1	74.3
Bird	Serinus canaria	Atlantic canary	Passeriformes	319	XP_030087344.1	329	63.3	74.6
Bird	Strigops habroptila	Kākāpō	Psittaciformes	319	XP_030363772.1	344	57.2	68.6
Reptile	Mauremys reevesii	Chinese pond turtle	Testudines	319	XP_039365209.1	351	62.1	73.6
Reptile	Varanus komodoensis	komodo dragon	Unidentata	319	XP_044277161.1	346	59.9	72.9
Reptile	Sphaerodactylus townsendi	townsend's least gecko	Gekkota	319	XP_048374902	343	59.8	71.6
Amphibian	Thamnophis elegans	western terrestrial garter snake	Unidentata	319	XP_032088188.1	337	55.6	70.1
Amphibian	Geotrypetes seraphini	gaboon caecilian	Gymnophiona	353	XP_033777097.1	341	58.1	70.5
Amphibian	Rana temporaria	common frog	Anura	353	XP_040182718.1	338	54.5	69.6
Fish	Bufo gargarizans	Chusan Island toad	Anura	353	XP_044138414.1	335	52.3	70.6
Fish	Protopterus annectens	West African lungfish	Dipnoi	408	XP_043916388.1	306	43.3	55.9
Fish	Latimeria chalumnae	West Indian Ocean coelacanth	Coelacanthiformes	414	XP_006004339.1	312	50.3	63.4
Fish	Salarias fasciatus	jewelled Blenny	Blenniiformes	431	XP_029975350.1	338	44.8	58.6
Fish	Thalassophryne amazonica	prehistoric monster fish	Batrachoidiformes	431	XP_034027462.1	340	41.7	54.5
Fish	Danio rerio	zebra fish	Cypriniformes	431	NP_001186669.1	338	41.3	56
	Stegostoma fasciatum	zebra shark	Chondrichthyes	464	XP_048417111	342	46.1	63.5

== Clinical significance ==
Expression of TMEM82 is dysregulated in hepatocellular carcinoma. TMEM82 is present in the interaction profile of kidney renal cell carcinoma and is a favorable prognostic marker in renal cancer. TMEM82 has enhanced RNA expression in liver and renal cancer but was not correlated with the overall survival of patients with colorectal cancer. A 65.7 kbp long microduplication has been found in patients with congenital lower urinary tract obstruction at the genomic location of TMEM82 gene; the microduplication affects TMEM82 and the other genes located there: FBLIM1, PLEKHM2, SLC25A34, SLC25A34-AS1. TMEM82 is significantly upregulated in glomeruli and predicted to have estrogen response elements.
