= ARFRP1 =

Protein-coding gene in the species Homo sapiens

Identifiers
- Aliases: ARFRP1, ARL18, ARP, Arp1, ADP ribosylation factor related protein 1
- External IDs: OMIM: 604699; MGI: 1923938; GeneCards: ARFRP1

Gene location (Human)
Chr.	Chromosome 20 (human)
Band	20q13.33	Start	63,698,642 bp
Band	20q13.33	End	63,708,025 bp

Gene location (Mouse)
Chr.	Chromosome 2 (mouse)
Band	2|2 H4	Start	180,999,483 bp
Band	2|2 H4	End	181,007,197 bp
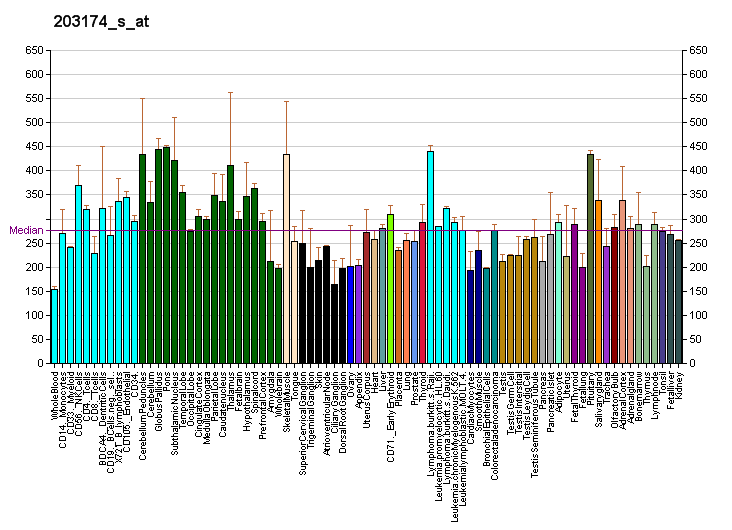

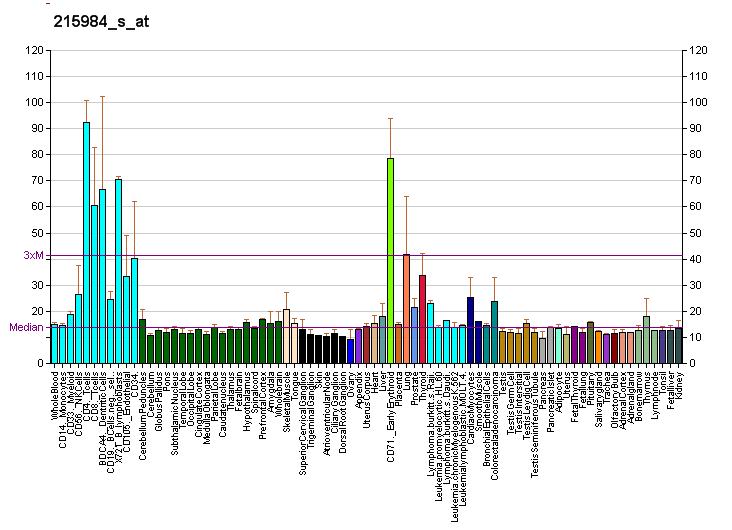
RNA expression pattern
Bgee	Human / Mouse (ortholog); Top expressed in: beta cell; apex of heart; olfactory bulb; mucosa of transverse colon; spleen; right frontal lobe; right hemisphere of cerebellum; stromal cell of endometrium; granulocyte; right auricle of heart / Top expressed in: saccule; neural layer of retina; otic placode; otic vesicle; medullary collecting duct; ventricular zone; external carotid artery; muscle of thigh; internal carotid artery; granulocyte; More reference expression data
BioGPS	More reference expression data
Gene ontology
Molecular function	nucleotide binding; GTP binding; protein binding; GTPase activity
Cellular component	trans-Golgi network; Golgi apparatus; intracellular anatomical structure; membrane; cytosol; trans-Golgi network membrane
Biological process	Golgi to plasma membrane protein transport; retrograde transport, endosome to Golgi; gastrulation; signal transduction; protein localization to Golgi apparatus; intracellular protein transport; protein localization to organelle; small GTPase mediated signal transduction
Sources:Amigo / QuickGO
Orthologs
Databases	NCBI: entry; OMA: entry
Species	Human	Mouse
Entrez	10139	76688
Ensembl	ENSG00000101246	ENSMUSG00000038671
UniProt	Q13795	Q8BXL7
RefSeq (mRNA)	NM_001134758; NM_001267544; NM_001267545; NM_001267546; NM_001267547 NM_001267548; NM_001267549; NM_003224	NM_001165991; NM_001165992; NM_001165995; NM_029702
RefSeq (protein)	NP_001128230; NP_001254473; NP_001254474; NP_001254475; NP_001254476 NP_001254477; NP_001254478; NP_003215; NP_001254476.1	NP_001159463; NP_001159464; NP_001159467; NP_083978
Location (UCSC)	Chr 20: 63.7 – 63.71 Mb	Chr 2: 181 – 181.01 Mb
PubMed search
- Wikidata
View/Edit Human	View/Edit Mouse

ADP-ribosylation factor-related protein 1 is a protein that in humans is encoded by the ARFRP1 gene.

== Function ==
The protein encoded by this gene is a membrane-associated GTP-ase and localizes to the plasma membrane. It is related to the ADP-ribosylation factor (ARF) and ARF-like (ARL) genes. The gene is located in a gene cluster that includes the a gene (M68) that is overexpressed in some tumors.

== Interactions ==
ARFRP1 has been shown to interact with PSCD1.
