= ARAP1 =

Protein-coding gene in the species Homo sapiens

Identifiers
- Aliases: ARAP1, CENTD2, ArfGAP with RhoGAP domain, ankyrin repeat and PH domain 1, cnt-d2
- External IDs: OMIM: 606646; MGI: 1916960; GeneCards: ARAP1
Available structures
PDB	Ortholog search: PDBe RCSB
PDB	List of PDB id codes 4X1V

Gene location (Human)
Chr.	Chromosome 11 (human)
Band	11q13.4	Start	72,685,069 bp
Band	11q13.4	End	72,793,599 bp

Gene location (Mouse)
Chr.	Chromosome 7 (mouse)
Band	7|7 E2	Start	100,997,274 bp
Band	7|7 E2	End	101,061,793 bp
RNA expression pattern
Bgee	Human / Mouse (ortholog); Top expressed in: granulocyte; monocyte; right uterine tube; upper lobe of left lung; right lung; spleen; right adrenal cortex; left adrenal cortex; anterior pituitary; right lobe of thyroid gland / Top expressed in: granulocyte; lip; gastrula; stroma of bone marrow; efferent ductule; tibiofemoral joint; thymus; lumbar spinal ganglion; uterus; spleen; More reference expression data
BioGPS	n/a
Gene ontology
Molecular function	metal ion binding; protein binding; GTPase activator activity; phosphatidylinositol-3,4,5-trisphosphate binding; type 1 angiotensin receptor binding
Cellular component	cytoplasm; Golgi apparatus; membrane; Golgi cisterna membrane; trans-Golgi network; cytoplasmic vesicle; nucleoplasm; cytosol; plasma membrane; intracellular membrane-bounded organelle
Biological process	actin filament reorganization involved in cell cycle; regulation of cell shape; negative regulation of stress fiber assembly; regulation of small GTPase mediated signal transduction; positive regulation of filopodium assembly; signal transduction; positive regulation of receptor recycling; positive regulation of epidermal growth factor receptor signaling pathway; positive regulation of GTPase activity
Sources:Amigo / QuickGO
Orthologs
Databases	NCBI: entry; OMA: entry
Species	Human	Mouse
Entrez	116985	69710
Ensembl	ENSG00000186635	ENSMUSG00000032812
UniProt	Q96P48	Q4LDD4
RefSeq (mRNA)	NM_015242; NM_001040118; NM_001135190; NM_001369489	NM_001040111; NM_001040112; NM_027180; NM_198096
RefSeq (protein)	NP_001035207; NP_001128662; NP_056057; NP_001356418	NP_001035200; NP_001035201; NP_081456; NP_932764; NP_001394730 NP_001394732
Location (UCSC)	Chr 11: 72.69 – 72.79 Mb	Chr 7: 101 – 101.06 Mb
PubMed search
- Wikidata
View/Edit Human	View/Edit Mouse

Arf-GAP with Rho-GAP domain, ANK repeat and PH domain-containing protein 1 is a protein that in humans is encoded by the ARAP1 gene. It regulates the endosomal pathway and cytoskeletal dynamics using its GTPase-activating protein activity.

== Structure ==
ARAP1 consists of Arf GAP, Rho GAP, Ankyrin repeat, RA, and five PH domains. In Homo sapiens, ARAP1 has a length of 1450 amino acids and a molecular weight of 162kDa. Seven alternatively spliced human isoforms have been reported.

Northern blot was used to infer the presence of ARAP1 in the following tissues: brain, heart, skeletal muscle, colon, thymus, spleen, kidney, liver, small intestine, placenta, lung, PBLC, adrenal gland, bladder, bone marrow, lymph node, mammary gland, prostate, spinal cord, stomach, thyroid, trachea, uterus.

== Function ==
ARAP1 was shown to exhibit GTPase-activating protein (GAP) activity for Arf and Rho GTPases in vitro. ARAP1's activity on Arf proteins is stimulated by phosphoinositides, with PI(3,4)P2 and PI(3,4,5)P3 showing the strongest effect. The PH-1 domain is the only domain that binds PI(3,4,5)P3 in vitro. ARAP1 prefers Arf1 and Arf5 over Arf6 as substrate. The GAP activity exerted on Rho proteins is not dependent on phosphoinositides.

Association of ARAP1 with the Golgi complex and endosomes was observed. This association depends on the presence of phosphatidylinositol 3-phosphate (endosomes) and phosphatidylinositol 4-phosphate (Golgi). There is conflicting research on the effect of ARAP1's level on the Golgi apparatus, as some report no effect on Golgi, while others report physiological changes. The endosomal pathway experiences differences dependent on ARAP1's abundance. Decreased ARAP1 levels accelerates endocytosis of epidermal growth factor receptor by reducing the available amount of Arf-GDP.

The Rho GAP activity of ARAP1 causes cell rounding and loss of stress fibers, while the Arf GAP activity causes the formation of filopodia. Furthermore, ARAP1 is implicated in the organization of the cytoskeleton, as it regulates the ring size of the circular dorsal ruffle and controls the actin dynamics and membrane traffic in osteoclasts.

== Disease association ==
Genome-wide association studies in populations of European ancestry have identified nine SNP's (single nuclear polymorphisms) on chromosome 11 that contributes to an independent as well as cumulative effect on the risk of developing type II diabetes mellitus. CENTD2 is significantly associated with decreased glucose-stimulated insulin release and increased plasma glucose values, suggesting that an impaired pancreatic beta cell function is the mediator to the diabetogenic effect of this locus.
