= ACAP1 =

Protein-coding gene in the species Homo sapiens

Identifiers
- Aliases: ACAP1, CENTB1, ArfGAP with coiled-coil, ankyrin repeat and PH domains 1
- External IDs: OMIM: 607763; MGI: 2388270; GeneCards: ACAP1
Available structures
| PDB | Ortholog search: PDBe RCSB |
| PDB | List of PDB id codes 3JUE, 3T9K, 4CKG, 4CKH, 4F1P, 4NSW |

Gene location (Human)
| Chr. | Chromosome 17 (human) |
| Band | 17p13.1 | Start | 7,336,529 bp |
| Band | 17p13.1 | End | 7,351,477 bp |

Gene location (Mouse)
| Chr. | Chromosome 11 (mouse) |
| Band | 11|11 B3 | Start | 69,772,393 bp |
| Band | 11|11 B3 | End | 69,786,365 bp |
RNA expression pattern
| Bgee | Human / Mouse (ortholog); Top expressed in: granulocyte; blood; lymph node; spleen; bone marrow cell; left testis; right testis; appendix; nucleus accumbens; pituitary gland / Top expressed in: granulocyte; thymus; blood; lymph node; mesenteric lymph nodes; spleen; pharynx; bone marrow; subcutaneous adipose tissue; embryo; More reference expression data |
| BioGPS | n/a |
Gene ontology
| Molecular function | protein binding; metal ion binding; GTPase activator activity |
| Cellular component | endosome; recycling endosome membrane; membrane; intracellular membrane-bounded organelle |
| Biological process | protein transport; positive regulation of GTPase activity; transport |
Sources:Amigo / QuickGO
Orthologs
| Databases | NCBI: entry; OMA: entry |
| Species | Human | Mouse |
| Entrez | 9744 | 216859 |
| Ensembl | ENSG00000072818; ENSG00000288169 | ENSMUSG00000001588 |
| UniProt | Q15027 | Q8K2H4 |
| RefSeq (mRNA) | NM_014716 | NM_153788 |
| RefSeq (protein) | NP_055531 | NP_722483 |
| Location (UCSC) | Chr 17: 7.34 – 7.35 Mb | Chr 11: 69.77 – 69.79 Mb |
| PubMed search |
- Wikidata
| View/Edit Human | View/Edit Mouse |

Arf-GAP with coiled-coil, ANK repeat and PH domain-containing protein 1 (ACAP1), also called Centaurin β1, is a protein that in humans is encoded by the gene ACAP1 (previously CENTB1). ACAP1 is a GTPase-activating protein (GAP) for ADP-ribosylation factor (ARF) 6 belonging to the ADP-ribosylation factor family. It also contains a coiled-coil structural motif, ankyrin repeat (ANK), and a PH domain.

The expression of ACAP1 is tissue-specific, with the highest levels observed in the lung and spleen, while the lower levels are found in the heart, kidney, liver, and pancreas.

== Structure ==
ACAP1 is composed of several distinct domains. Its structure includes an Arf-GAP domain with coiled-coil region, along with an ankyrin (ANK) repeat and a pleckstrin homology (PH) domain-containing protein.

It has a length of 740 amino acids and a molecular mass of 81,536 Da. As for its quaternary structure, the ACAP1 protein has a banana-structure homodimer configuration. These homodimers laterally assemble into tetramers, which further pack helically onto the membrane.

== Interactions ==
ACAP1 interacts with GTP-bound ARF6, regulating polymerization of the actin cytoskeleton around the plasma membrane. ACAP1 also interacts with the third cytoplasmic loop of SLC2A4/GLUT4: it anchors GLUT4 within specific intercellular compartments of facilitate its sorting into the correct vesicles for transport. ACAP1 may also function as an adaptor protein by binding to clathrin heavy chain, linking specific cargo to the clathrin coat during the formation of a vesicle. Other proteins known to interact with ACAP1 include GULP1 and the integrin β1 chain; in both cases ACAP1 regulates the sorting and recycling of vesicle traffic.

== Function ==
CENTB1 is a cytoplasmic protein that is able to down-regulate the NF-κB activity through NOD-1 and NOD-2 signaling pathways. Which can be in response to γ-D-glutamyl-meso-diaminopimelic acid (iE-DAP) and muramyl dipeptide (MDP-LD) stimulation in intestinal epithelial cells. CENTB1 is a component of a novel clathrin coat complex involved in endocytic recycling, with initial evidence from studies in HeLa cells.

== Regulation ==
With the regulation of ARF6, the CENTB1 containing clathrin coat complex functions in two physiological contexts requiring endocytic recycling. Which is integrin recycling, vital for cell migration, and Glut4 recycling, essential for glucose homeostasis. The CENTB1 protein plays an important role in regulating integrin β1 (ITGB1) by facilitating its export from recycling endosomes to the cell surface and ITGB1-dependent cell migration.

CENTB1 protein regulates endocytic recycling, which is a process that is essential for diverse cellular function such as nutrient uptake, cell polarity, cell motility, signal transduction, and phagocytosis. As well, CENTB1 facilitates TfR recycling and establishes its role in cargo sorting. It was also found that CENTB1 is a component of a novel clathrin coat complex that regulates stimulation-dependent integrin recycling and insulin-stimulated Glut4 recycling.

== Clinical significance ==
CENTB1 was found to be an example of a protein that was initially characterized in human neutrophils. CENTB1 could be regarded as beneficial in treating chronic inflammatory disorders dominated by neutrophils, by functioning as a specific modulator of NF-κB activity.

=== Ulcerative colitis ===
CENTB1 gene and protein expression were investigated in patients with ulcerative colitis (UC). CENTB1 gene expression was measured from colonic biopsies of UC patients and was detected by using immunohistochemistry. Its findings indicated that the expression of CENTB1 gene was significantly up-regulated in colonic mucosa from patients with active UC compared to remission UC and the healthy patients. CENTB1 cells were primarily localized within inflammatory infiltrates and dominated by polymorphonuclear cells. As well, extending from the adventitia to the mucosa, with higher abundance observed in epithelial cells and the adventitia. Therefore, it suggest that CENTB1 is involved in the inflammatory process in patients with UC.
