= Pleckstrin homology domain containing A4 =

Protein-coding gene in the species Homo sapiens

PLEKHA4

Identifiers
- Aliases: PLEKHA4, PEPP1, pleckstrin homology domain containing A4
- External IDs: OMIM: 607769; MGI: 1916467; GeneCards: PLEKHA4
Available structures
PDB	Ortholog search: PDBe RCSB
PDB	List of PDB id codes 1UPQ, 1UPR

Gene location (Human)
Chr.	Chromosome 19 (human)
Band	19q13.33	Start	48,837,097 bp
Band	19q13.33	End	48,868,617 bp

Gene location (Mouse)
Chr.	Chromosome 7 (mouse)
Band	7|7 B3	Start	45,175,754 bp
Band	7|7 B3	End	45,203,653 bp
RNA expression pattern
Bgee	Human / Mouse (ortholog); Top expressed in: sural nerve; trigeminal ganglion; Descending thoracic aorta; spinal ganglia; apex of heart; right ovary; gastric mucosa; ascending aorta; left coronary artery; left ovary / Top expressed in: sciatic nerve; fourth ventricle; choroid plexus of fourth ventricle; lumbar spinal ganglion; choroidal fissure; saccule; otic vesicle; cochlea; extraocular muscle; utricle; More reference expression data
BioGPS	n/a
Gene ontology
Molecular function	lipid binding; phosphatidylinositol-3-phosphate binding
Cellular component	cytoplasm; membrane; plasma membrane; cellular component
Biological process	phosphatidylinositol biosynthetic process; biological process
Sources:Amigo / QuickGO
Orthologs
Databases	NCBI: entry; OMA: entry
Species	Human	Mouse
Entrez	57664	69217
Ensembl	ENSG00000105559	ENSMUSG00000040428
UniProt	Q9H4M7	Q8VC98
RefSeq (mRNA)	NM_001161354; NM_020904	NM_148927; NM_001381849
RefSeq (protein)	NP_001154826; NP_065955	n/a
Location (UCSC)	Chr 19: 48.84 – 48.87 Mb	Chr 7: 45.18 – 45.2 Mb
PubMed search
- Wikidata
View/Edit Human	View/Edit Mouse

Pleckstrin homology domain containing A4 is a protein that in humans is encoded by the PLEKHA4 gene.

== Function ==
This gene encodes a pleckstrin homology (PH) domain-containing protein. The PH domain is found near the N-terminus and contains a putative phosphatidylinositol 3, 4, 5-triphosphate-binding motif (PPBM). Elevated expression of this gene has been observed in some melanomas. Alternate splicing results in multiple transcript variants encoding different isoforms.
