= OSBP2 =

Protein-coding gene in the species Homo sapiens

Identifiers
- Aliases: OSBP2, HLM, ORP-4, ORP4, OSBPL1, OSBPL4, oxysterol binding protein 2
- External IDs: OMIM: 606729; MGI: 1921559; GeneCards: OSBP2

Gene location (Human)
Chr.	Chromosome 22 (human)
Band	22q12.2	Start	30,693,782 bp
Band	22q12.2	End	30,907,824 bp

Gene location (Mouse)
Chr.	Chromosome 11 (mouse)
Band	11|11 A1	Start	3,653,731 bp
Band	11|11 A1	End	3,813,903 bp
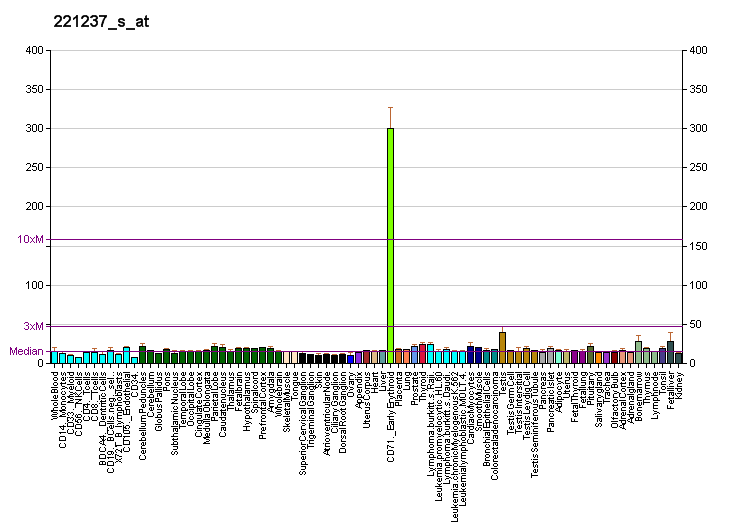
RNA expression pattern
Bgee	Human / Mouse (ortholog); Top expressed in: buccal mucosa cell; left testis; right testis; monocyte; right hemisphere of cerebellum; blood; prefrontal cortex; right frontal lobe; trabecular bone; male germ cell / Top expressed in: spermatid; neural layer of retina; interventricular septum; seminiferous tubule; spermatocyte; visual cortex; primary visual cortex; superior frontal gyrus; retinal pigment epithelium; lens; More reference expression data
BioGPS	More reference expression data
Gene ontology
Molecular function	cholesterol binding; protein binding; lipid binding; sterol transporter activity; sterol binding
Cellular component	membrane; apical dendrite; cytosol; plasma membrane; intracellular membrane-bounded organelle; perinuclear endoplasmic reticulum
Biological process	lipid transport; spermatid development; sterol transport
Sources:Amigo / QuickGO
Orthologs
Databases	NCBI: entry; OMA: entry
Species	Human	Mouse
Entrez	23762	74309
Ensembl	ENSG00000184792	ENSMUSG00000020435
UniProt	Q969R2	Q5QNQ6
RefSeq (mRNA)	NM_001003812; NM_001282738; NM_001282739; NM_001282740; NM_001282741 NM_001282742; NM_030758	NM_152818; NM_001302630; NM_001302631; NM_001363163; NM_001363164
RefSeq (protein)	NP_001269667; NP_001269668; NP_001269669; NP_001269670; NP_001269671 NP_110385	NP_001289559; NP_001289560; NP_690031; NP_001350092; NP_001350093
Location (UCSC)	Chr 22: 30.69 – 30.91 Mb	Chr 11: 3.65 – 3.81 Mb
PubMed search
- Wikidata
View/Edit Human	View/Edit Mouse

Oxysterol-binding protein 2 is a protein that in humans is encoded by the OSBP2 gene.

Oxysterols are byproducts of cholesterol that can have cytotoxic effects on many cell types. The protein encoded by this gene contains a pleckstrin homology (PH) domain and an oxysterol-binding region. It binds oxysterols such as 7-ketocholesterol and may inhibit their cytotoxicity. Alternate transcriptional splice variants have been observed but have not been fully characterized.
