= CYTH3 =

Protein-coding gene in the species Homo sapiens

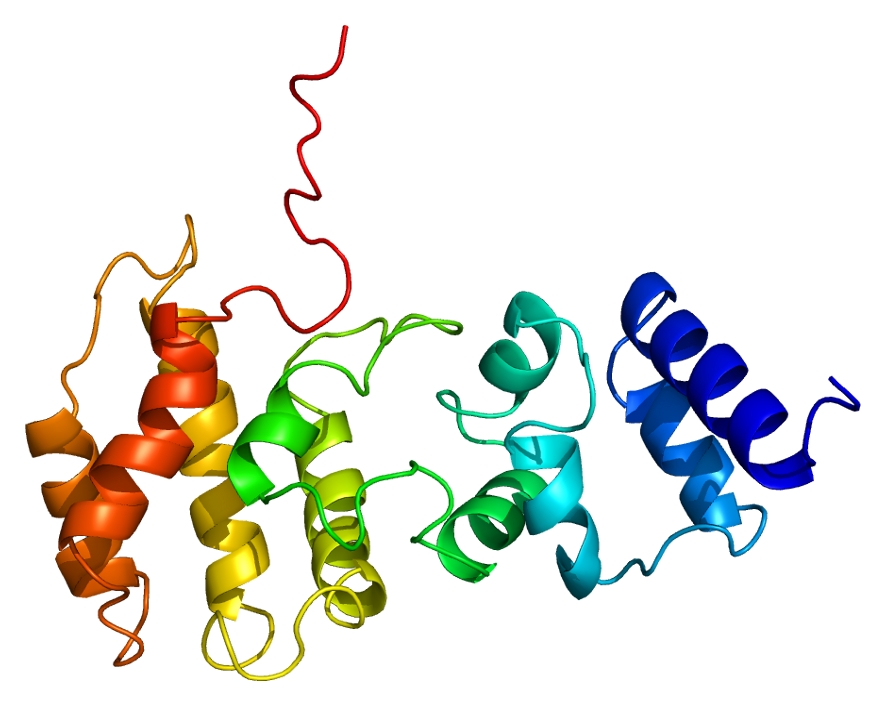

Identifiers
- Aliases: CYTH3, ARNO3, GRP1, PSCD3, cytohesin 3, cytohesin-3
- External IDs: OMIM: 605081; MGI: 1335107; GeneCards: CYTH3
Available structures
PDB	Ortholog search: PDBe RCSB
PDB	List of PDB id codes 4KAX

Gene location (Human)
Chr.	Chromosome 7 (human)
Band	7p22.1	Start	6,161,776 bp
Band	7p22.1	End	6,272,644 bp

Gene location (Mouse)
Chr.	Chromosome 5 (mouse)
Band	5 G2|5 82.36 cM	Start	143,608,202 bp
Band	5 G2|5 82.36 cM	End	143,696,005 bp
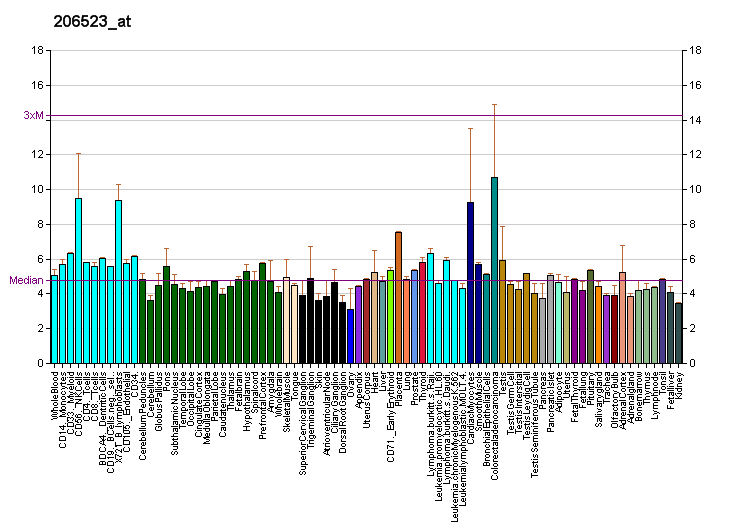
RNA expression pattern
Bgee	Human / Mouse (ortholog); Top expressed in: endothelial cell; visceral pleura; parietal pleura; middle temporal gyrus; Brodmann area 23; spinal ganglia; trigeminal ganglion; saphenous vein; tendon of biceps brachii; tibia / Top expressed in: superior cervical ganglion; right lung; carotid body; right lung lobe; barrel cortex; iris; left lung; ciliary body; endothelial cell of lymphatic vessel; fetal liver hematopoietic progenitor cell; More reference expression data
BioGPS	More reference expression data
Gene ontology
Molecular function	protein binding; phosphatidylinositol-3,4,5-trisphosphate binding; guanyl-nucleotide exchange factor activity; lipid binding
Cellular component	cytoplasm; ruffle; extrinsic component of cytoplasmic side of plasma membrane; plasma membrane; membrane; Golgi membrane; cytosol; nucleoplasm; adherens junction; bicellular tight junction; cell junction
Biological process	regulation of ARF protein signal transduction; Golgi vesicle transport; positive regulation of cell adhesion; establishment of epithelial cell polarity
Sources:Amigo / QuickGO
Orthologs
Databases	NCBI: entry; OMA: entry
Species	Human	Mouse
Entrez	9265	19159
Ensembl	ENSG00000008256	ENSMUSG00000018001
UniProt	O43739	O08967
RefSeq (mRNA)	NM_004227	NM_001163548; NM_011182
RefSeq (protein)	NP_004218; NP_001354509; NP_001354510; NP_001354511	NP_001157020; NP_035312
Location (UCSC)	Chr 7: 6.16 – 6.27 Mb	Chr 5: 143.61 – 143.7 Mb
PubMed search
- Wikidata
View/Edit Human	View/Edit Mouse

Cytohesin-3 is a protein that in humans is encoded by the CYTH3 gene.

This gene encodes a member of the cytohesin (CYTH) family, formerly known as the PSCD (pleckstrin homology, Sec7 and coiled-coil domains) family. Cytohesin family members have identical structural organization that consists of an N-terminal coiled-coil motif, a central Sec7 domain, and a C-terminal pleckstrin homology (PH) domain. The coiled-coil motif is involved in homodimerization, the Sec7 domain contains guanine-nucleotide exchange protein (GEP) activity, and the PH domain interacts with phospholipids and is responsible for association of CYTHs with membranes. Members of this family appear to mediate the regulation of protein sorting and membrane trafficking. This encoded protein is involved in the control of Golgi structure and function, and it may have a physiological role in regulating ADP-ribosylation factor protein 6 (ARF) functions, in addition to acting on ARF1.
