= ARHGEF5 =

Protein-coding gene in the species Homo sapiens

Identifiers
- Aliases: ARHGEF5, GEF5, P60, TIM, TIM1, Rho guanine nucleotide exchange factor 5
- External IDs: OMIM: 600888; MGI: 1858952; GeneCards: ARHGEF5

Gene location (Human)
Chr.	Chromosome 7 (human)
Band	7q35	Start	144,355,288 bp
Band	7q35	End	144,380,632 bp

Gene location (Mouse)
Chr.	Chromosome 6 (mouse)
Band	6|6 B2.1	Start	43,242,516 bp
Band	6|6 B2.1	End	43,266,254 bp
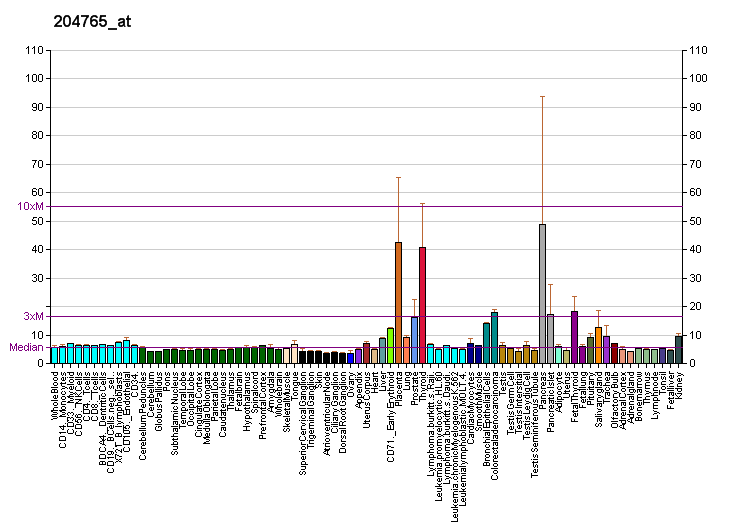
RNA expression pattern
Bgee	Human / Mouse (ortholog); Top expressed in: skin of leg; skin of abdomen; mucosa of transverse colon; left lobe of thyroid gland; right lobe of thyroid gland; duodenum; minor salivary glands; human kidney; body of pancreas; prostate / Top expressed in: skin of external ear; epithelium of stomach; duodenum; lip; jejunum; large intestine; colon; pyloric antrum; mucous cell of stomach; left colon; More reference expression data
BioGPS	More reference expression data
Gene ontology
Molecular function	GTP binding; protein binding; lipid binding; guanyl-nucleotide exchange factor activity
Cellular component	cytoplasm; cell projection; plasma membrane; nucleoplasm; cell junction; podosome; nucleus; cell periphery; cytosol
Biological process	intracellular signal transduction; regulation of actin cytoskeleton organization; positive regulation of JUN kinase activity; regulation of GTPase activity; positive regulation of DNA-binding transcription factor activity; positive regulation of podosome assembly; myeloid dendritic cell chemotaxis; positive regulation of GTPase activity; positive regulation of protein import; regulation of ERK1 and ERK2 cascade; regulation of Rho protein signal transduction; regulation of cytoskeleton organization; actin cytoskeleton organization; positive regulation of stress fiber assembly; positive regulation of apoptotic process; regulation of small GTPase mediated signal transduction; G protein-coupled receptor signaling pathway
Sources:Amigo / QuickGO
Orthologs
Databases	NCBI: entry; OMA: entry
Species	Human	Mouse
Entrez	7984	54324
Ensembl	ENSG00000050327	ENSMUSG00000033542
UniProt	Q12774	E9Q7D5
RefSeq (mRNA)	NM_001002861; NM_005435	NM_133674
RefSeq (protein)	NP_005426	NP_598435
Location (UCSC)	Chr 7: 144.36 – 144.38 Mb	Chr 6: 43.24 – 43.27 Mb
PubMed search
- Wikidata
View/Edit Human	View/Edit Mouse

Rho guanine nucleotide exchange factor 5 is a protein that in humans is encoded by the ARHGEF5 gene.

Rho GTPases play a fundamental role in numerous cellular processes initiated by extracellular stimuli that work through G protein-coupled receptors. The encoded protein may form a complex with G proteins and stimulate Rho-dependent signals. This protein may be involved in the control of cytoskeletal organization.
