= RTKN =

Protein-coding gene in the species Homo sapiens

Identifiers
- Aliases: RTKN, rhotekin
- External IDs: OMIM: 602288; MGI: 107371; GeneCards: RTKN

Gene location (Human)
Chr.	Chromosome 2 (human)
Band	2p13.1	Start	74,425,835 bp
Band	2p13.1	End	74,442,422 bp

Gene location (Mouse)
Chr.	Chromosome 6 (mouse)
Band	6 C3|6 35.94 cM	Start	83,112,444 bp
Band	6 C3|6 35.94 cM	End	83,129,560 bp
RNA expression pattern
Bgee	Human / Mouse (ortholog); Top expressed in: C1 segment; right lobe of liver; tibial nerve; sural nerve; human kidney; substantia nigra; body of pancreas; inferior ganglion of vagus nerve; corpus callosum; mucosa of transverse colon / Top expressed in: superior frontal gyrus; lip; primary visual cortex; dentate gyrus of hippocampal formation granule cell; internal carotid artery; external carotid artery; pontine nuclei; right kidney; lacrimal gland; deep cerebellar nuclei; More reference expression data
BioGPS	n/a
Gene ontology
Molecular function	nucleotide binding; GTP binding; GTPase inhibitor activity; protein binding
Cellular component	cytosol; cellular component; actomyosin contractile ring
Biological process	signal transduction; apoptotic process; negative regulation of GTPase activity; regulation of apoptotic process; Rho protein signal transduction; septin cytoskeleton organization; mitotic cytokinesis; actomyosin contractile ring assembly; cortical cytoskeleton organization; septin ring organization; protein localization to mitotic actomyosin contractile ring
Sources:Amigo / QuickGO
Orthologs
Databases	NCBI: entry; OMA: entry
Species	Human	Mouse
Entrez	6242	20166
Ensembl	ENSG00000114993	ENSMUSG00000034930
UniProt	Q9BST9	Q8C6B2
RefSeq (mRNA)	NM_001015055; NM_001015056; NM_033046	NM_001136227; NM_009106; NM_133641; NM_001355524; NM_001355525
RefSeq (protein)	NP_001015055; NP_001015056; NP_149035	NP_001129699; NP_033132; NP_598396; NP_001342453; NP_001342454
Location (UCSC)	Chr 2: 74.43 – 74.44 Mb	Chr 6: 83.11 – 83.13 Mb
PubMed search
- Wikidata
View/Edit Human	View/Edit Mouse

Rhotekin is a protein that in humans is encoded by the RTKN gene.

This gene encodes a scaffold protein that interacts with GTP-bound Rho proteins. Binding of this protein inhibits the GTPase activity of Rho proteins. This protein may interfere with the conversion of active, GTP-bound Rho to the inactive GDP-bound form by RhoGAP. Rho proteins regulate many important cellular processes, including cytokinesis, transcription, smooth muscle contraction, cell growth and transformation. Dysregulation of the Rho signal transduction pathway has been implicated in many forms of cancer. Alternative splicing results in multiple transcript variants encoding different isoforms.
