= Spermatogenesis associated 13 =

Protein-coding gene in the species Homo sapiens

SPATA13

Identifiers
- Aliases: SPATA13, ARHGEF29, ASEF2, spermatogenesis associated 13
- External IDs: OMIM: 613324; MGI: 104838; GeneCards: SPATA13

Gene location (Mouse)
Chr.	Chromosome 14 (mouse)
Band	14 D1|14 31.77 cM	Start	60,871,450 bp
Band	14 D1|14 31.77 cM	End	61,002,005 bp
Gene ontology
Molecular function	protein binding; guanyl-nucleotide exchange factor activity; identical protein binding
Cellular component	cytoplasm; filopodium; ruffle membrane; plasma membrane; cell projection; membrane; lamellipodium; nucleoplasm; cytosol
Biological process	filopodium assembly; regulation of Rho protein signal transduction; regulation of cell migration; cell migration; lamellipodium assembly
Sources:Amigo / QuickGO
Orthologs
Databases	NCBI: entry
Species	Human	Mouse
Entrez	221178	219140
Ensembl	n/a	ENSMUSG00000021990
UniProt	Q96N96	Q5DU57
RefSeq (mRNA)	NM_001166271; NM_001286792; NM_001286793; NM_001286794; NM_001286795 NM_153023	NM_001033272; NM_001310594
RefSeq (protein)	NP_001159743; NP_001273721; NP_001273722; NP_001273723; NP_001273724 NP_694568; NP_694568.1	NP_001028444; NP_001297523; NP_001391878; NP_001391879; NP_001391880 NP_001391881; NP_001391882; NP_001391883; NP_001391893
Location (UCSC)	n/a	Chr 14: 60.87 – 61 Mb
PubMed search
- Wikidata
View/Edit Human	View/Edit Mouse

Spermatogenesis associated 13 is a protein that in humans is encoded by the SPATA13 gene.
