= DAPP1 =

Protein-coding gene in the species Homo sapiens

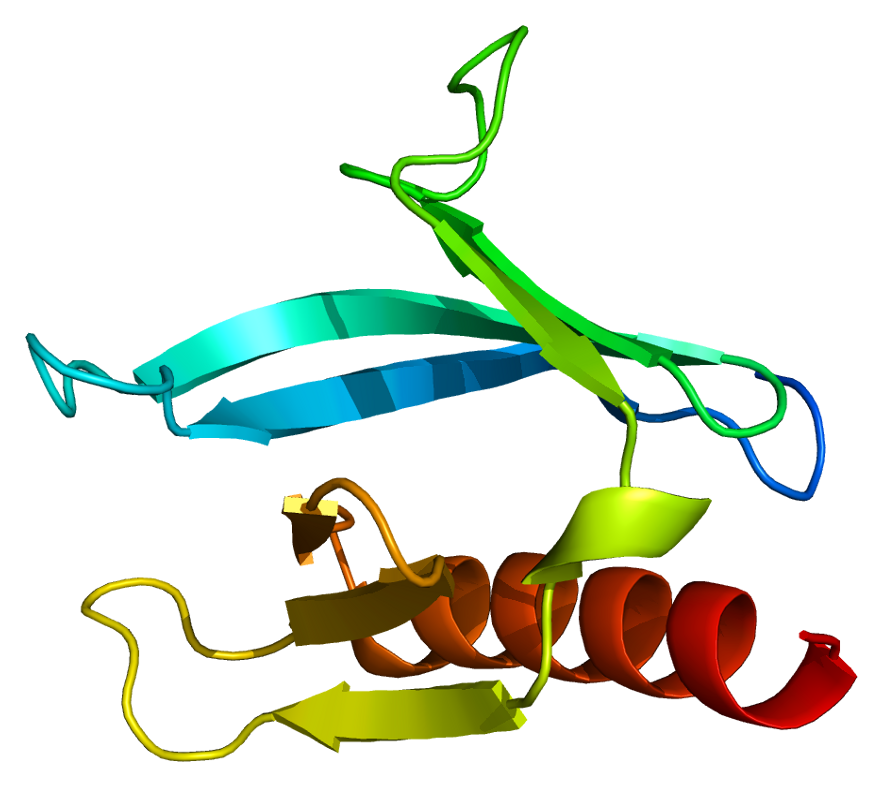

Identifiers
- Aliases: DAPP1, BAM32, dual adaptor of phosphotyrosine and 3-phosphoinositides, dual adaptor of phosphotyrosine and 3-phosphoinositides 1
- External IDs: OMIM: 605768; MGI: 1347063; GeneCards: DAPP1
Available structures
PDB	Ortholog search: PDBe RCSB
PDB	List of PDB id codes 1FAO, 1FB8

Gene location (Human)
Chr.	Chromosome 4 (human)
Band	4q23	Start	99,816,827 bp
Band	4q23	End	99,870,190 bp

Gene location (Mouse)
Chr.	Chromosome 3 (mouse)
Band	3|3 G3	Start	137,636,768 bp
Band	3|3 G3	End	137,687,306 bp
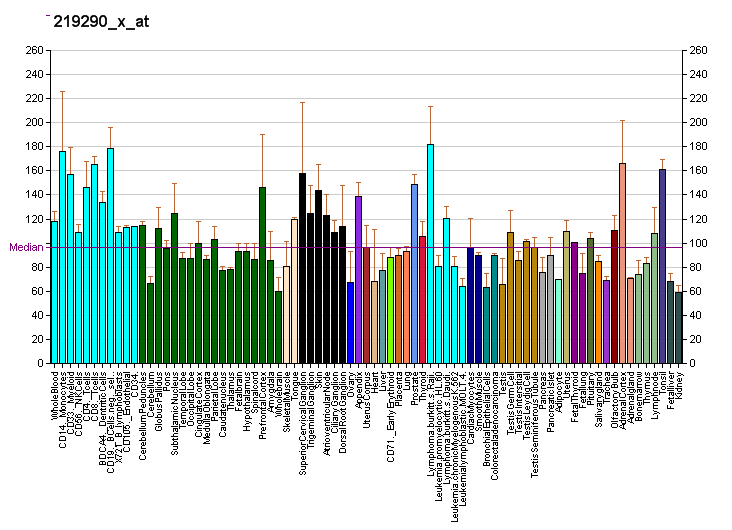
RNA expression pattern
Bgee	Human / Mouse (ortholog); Top expressed in: amniotic fluid; epithelium of nasopharynx; monocyte; buccal mucosa cell; mucosa of paranasal sinus; oral cavity; epithelium of bronchus; bronchial epithelial cell; palpebral conjunctiva; sperm / Top expressed in: epithelium of small intestine; granulocyte; spermatocyte; seminiferous tubule; spermatid; blood; zygote; conjunctival fornix; tibiofemoral joint; bone marrow; More reference expression data
BioGPS	More reference expression data
Gene ontology
Molecular function	protein binding; phospholipid binding; phosphatidylinositol-3,4,5-trisphosphate binding; phosphatidylinositol-3,4-bisphosphate binding; PDZ domain binding
Cellular component	cytosol; plasma membrane; membrane; cytoplasm
Biological process	protein dephosphorylation; signal transduction
Sources:Amigo / QuickGO
Orthologs
Databases	NCBI: entry; OMA: entry
Species	Human	Mouse
Entrez	27071	26377
Ensembl	ENSG00000070190	ENSMUSG00000028159
UniProt	Q9UN19	Q9QXT1
RefSeq (mRNA)	NM_001306151; NM_014395	NM_011932; NM_001310753
RefSeq (protein)	NP_001293080; NP_055210	NP_001297682; NP_036062
Location (UCSC)	Chr 4: 99.82 – 99.87 Mb	Chr 3: 137.64 – 137.69 Mb
PubMed search
- Wikidata
View/Edit Human	View/Edit Mouse

Dual adapter for phosphotyrosine and 3-phosphotyrosine and 3-phosphoinositide is a protein that in humans is encoded by the DAPP1 gene.
