= RAPH1 =

Protein-coding gene in the species Homo sapiens

Identifiers
- Aliases: RAPH1, ALS2CR18, ALS2CR9, LPD, PREL-2, PREL2, RMO1, RalGDS/AF-6, Ras association (RalGDS/AF-6) and pleckstrin homology domains 1
- External IDs: OMIM: 609035; MGI: 1924550; GeneCards: RAPH1
Available structures
PDB	Human UniProt search: PDBe RCSB
PDB	List of PDB id codes 4GMV, 4GN1

Gene location (Human)
Chr.	Chromosome 2 (human)
Band	2q33.2	Start	203,394,345 bp
Band	2q33.2	End	203,535,335 bp

Gene location (Mouse)
Chr.	Chromosome 1 (mouse)
Band	1|1 C2	Start	60,521,451 bp
Band	1|1 C2	End	60,606,263 bp
RNA expression pattern
Bgee	Human / Mouse (ortholog); Top expressed in: pancreatic epithelial cell; tibia; pancreatic ductal cell; endothelial cell; synovial joint; synovial membrane; visceral pleura; skin of arm; cartilage tissue; pars reticulata / Top expressed in: otolith organ; utricle; body of femur; Rostral migratory stream; myocardium of ventricle; adrenal gland; superior cervical ganglion; substantia nigra; soleus muscle; left lung lobe; More reference expression data
BioGPS	n/a
Gene ontology
Molecular function	protein binding
Cellular component	cytoplasm; filopodium; cell projection; cytoskeleton; cell leading edge; membrane; lamellipodium; cytosol; plasma membrane; nuclear body
Biological process	signal transduction; axon extension
Sources:Amigo / QuickGO
Orthologs
Databases	NCBI: entry; OMA: entry
Species	Human	Mouse
Entrez	65059	77300
Ensembl	ENSG00000173166	ENSMUSG00000026014
UniProt	Q70E73	n/a
RefSeq (mRNA)	NM_025252; NM_203365; NM_213589; NM_001329728	NM_001045513
RefSeq (protein)	NP_001316657; NP_976241; NP_998754	n/a
Location (UCSC)	Chr 2: 203.39 – 203.54 Mb	Chr 1: 60.52 – 60.61 Mb
PubMed search
- Wikidata
View/Edit Human	View/Edit Mouse

Ras-associated and pleckstrin homology domains-containing protein 1 is a protein that in humans is encoded by the RAPH1 gene.
