= AFAP1 =

Protein-coding gene in humans

Identifiers
- Aliases: AFAP1, AFAP, AFAP-110, AFAP110, actin filament associated protein 1
- External IDs: OMIM: 608252; MGI: 1917542; GeneCards: AFAP1

Gene location (Human)
Chr.	Chromosome 4 (human)
Band	4p16.1	Start	7,758,714 bp
Band	4p16.1	End	7,939,926 bp

Gene location (Mouse)
Chr.	Chromosome 5 (mouse)
Band	5|5 B3	Start	36,050,663 bp
Band	5|5 B3	End	36,161,267 bp
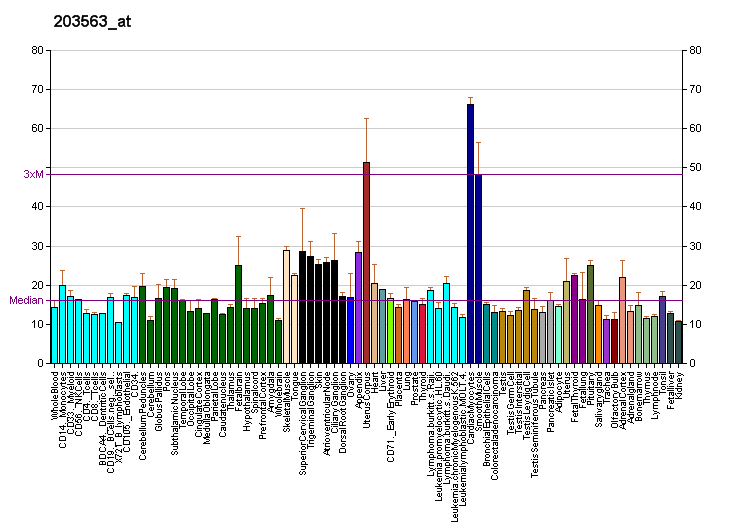
RNA expression pattern
Bgee	Human / Mouse (ortholog); Top expressed in: stromal cell of endometrium; sural nerve; right testis; left testis; ganglionic eminence; muscle layer of sigmoid colon; epithelium of colon; popliteal artery; tibial arteries; testicle / Top expressed in: pineal gland; decidua; iris; umbilical cord; aorta; superior cervical ganglion; otolith organ; calvaria; utricle; atrium; More reference expression data
BioGPS	More reference expression data
Gene ontology
Molecular function	actin binding; SH3 domain binding; SH2 domain binding
Cellular component	cytoplasm; cytoskeleton; focal adhesion; cytosol; actin cytoskeleton
Biological process	regulation of signal transduction; regulation of cytoskeleton organization
Sources:Amigo / QuickGO
Orthologs
Databases	NCBI: entry; OMA: entry
Species	Human	Mouse
Entrez	60312	70292
Ensembl	ENSG00000196526	ENSMUSG00000029094
UniProt	Q8N556	Q80YS6
RefSeq (mRNA)	NM_001134647; NM_021638; NM_198595; NM_001371090; NM_001371091	NM_027373
RefSeq (protein)	NP_001128119; NP_940997; NP_001358019; NP_001358020	NP_081649; NP_001390348; NP_001390349; NP_001390350
Location (UCSC)	Chr 4: 7.76 – 7.94 Mb	Chr 5: 36.05 – 36.16 Mb
PubMed search
- Wikidata
View/Edit Human	View/Edit Mouse

Actin filament-associated protein 1 is a protein that in humans is encoded by the AFAP1 gene.

The protein encoded by this gene is a Src binding partner. It may represent a potential modulator of actin filament integrity in response to cellular signals, and may function as an adaptor protein by linking Src family members and/or other signaling proteins to actin filaments. Two alternative transcripts encoding the same protein have been identified.
