= ARAP2 =

Protein-coding gene in the species Homo sapiens

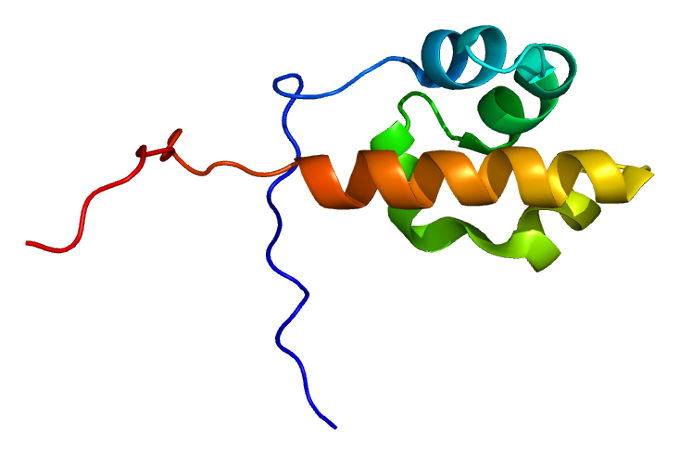

Identifiers
- Aliases: ARAP2, CENTD1, PARX, ArfGAP with RhoGAP domain, ankyrin repeat and PH domain 2
- External IDs: OMIM: 606645; MGI: 2684416; GeneCards: ARAP2
Available structures
| PDB | Ortholog search: PDBe RCSB |
| PDB | List of PDB id codes 1X40, 2COD |

Gene location (Human)
| Chr. | Chromosome 4 (human) |
| Band | 4p14 | Start | 35,948,221 bp |
| Band | 4p14 | End | 36,244,514 bp |

Gene location (Mouse)
| Chr. | Chromosome 5 (mouse) |
| Band | 5|5 C3.1 | Start | 62,759,788 bp |
| Band | 5|5 C3.1 | End | 62,923,502 bp |
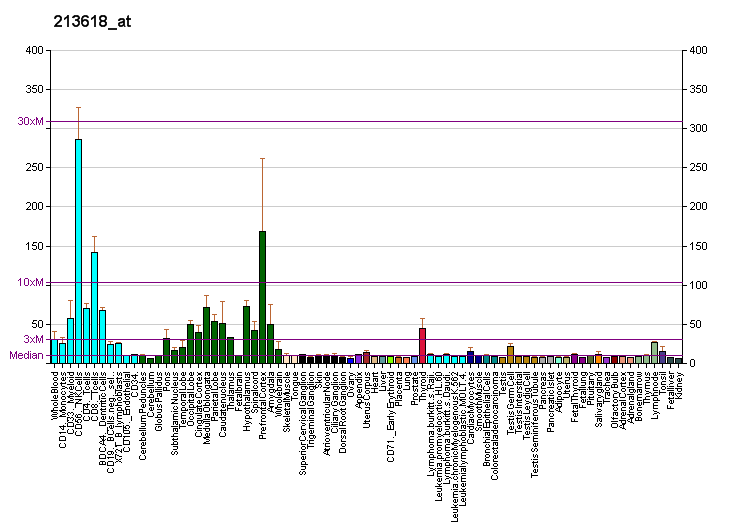
RNA expression pattern
| Bgee | Human / Mouse (ortholog); Top expressed in: endothelial cell; secondary oocyte; corpus callosum; gingival epithelium; optic nerve; dorsal motor nucleus of vagus nerve; amniotic fluid; internal globus pallidus; middle temporal gyrus; Brodmann area 23 / Top expressed in: secondary oocyte; medial geniculate nucleus; zygote; hair follicle; subdivision of hippocampus; Region I of hippocampus proper; primary motor cortex; lateral geniculate nucleus; inferior colliculi; piriform cortex; More reference expression data |
| BioGPS | More reference expression data |
Gene ontology
| Molecular function | metal ion binding; GTPase activator activity; phosphatidylinositol-3,4,5-trisphosphate binding |
| Cellular component | cytoplasm; cytosol |
| Biological process | positive regulation of GTPase activity; regulation of small GTPase mediated signal transduction; signal transduction |
Sources:Amigo / QuickGO
Orthologs
| Databases | NCBI: entry; OMA: entry |
| Species | Human | Mouse |
| Entrez | 116984 | 212285 |
| Ensembl | ENSG00000047365 | ENSMUSG00000037999 |
| UniProt | Q8WZ64 | Q8BZ05 |
| RefSeq (mRNA) | NM_015230; NM_139182 | NM_178407 |
| RefSeq (protein) | NP_056045 | n/a |
| Location (UCSC) | Chr 4: 35.95 – 36.24 Mb | Chr 5: 62.76 – 62.92 Mb |
| PubMed search |
- Wikidata
| View/Edit Human | View/Edit Mouse |

Arf-GAP with Rho-GAP domain, ANK repeat and PH domain-containing protein 2 is a protein that in humans is encoded by the ARAP2 gene.

== Function ==
The protein encoded by this gene contains ARF-GAP, RHO-GAP, ankyrin repeat, RAS-associating, and pleckstrin homology domains. This protein lacks the predicted catalytic arginine in the RHO-GAP domain and is therefore unlikely to have RHO-GAP activity. While the encoded protein does contain a sterile alpha motif (SAM) commonly found in some signaling molecules, the function of the protein has not been determined. Two transcript variants encoding different isoforms have been found for this gene.
