= PHLDA2 =

Protein-coding gene in the species Homo sapiens

Identifiers
- Aliases: PHLDA2, BRW1C, BWR1C, HLDA2, IPL, TSSC3, pleckstrin homology like domain family A member 2
- External IDs: OMIM: 602131; MGI: 1202307; GeneCards: PHLDA2

Gene location (Human)
Chr.	Chromosome 11 (human)
Band	11p15.4	Start	2,928,273 bp
Band	11p15.4	End	2,929,420 bp

Gene location (Mouse)
Chr.	Chromosome 7 (mouse)
Band	7 F5|7 88.23 cM	Start	143,055,282 bp
Band	7 F5|7 88.23 cM	End	143,056,887 bp
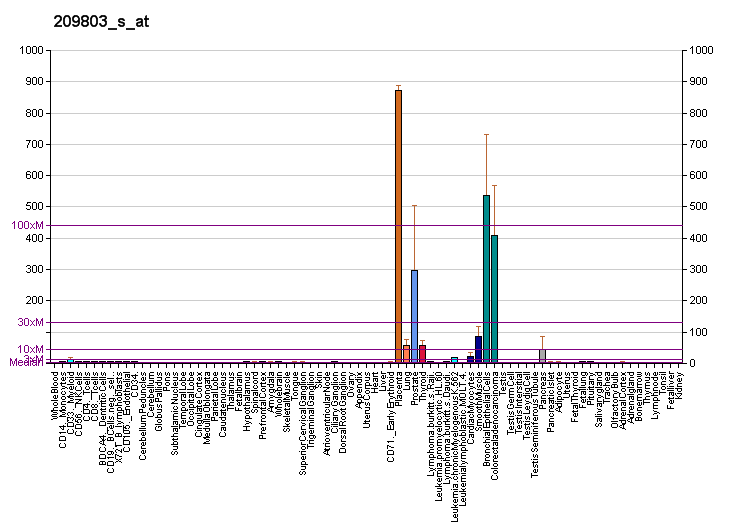
RNA expression pattern
Bgee	Human / Mouse (ortholog); Top expressed in: placenta; mucosa of transverse colon; olfactory zone of nasal mucosa; stromal cell of endometrium; skin of abdomen; vagina; ascending aorta; gonad; prostate; testicle / Top expressed in: yolk sac; primitive streak; embryo; epiblast; right kidney; proximal tubule; embryo; placenta; zygote; mesoderm; More reference expression data
BioGPS	More reference expression data
Orthologs
Databases	NCBI: entry; OMA: entry
Species	Human	Mouse
Entrez	7262	22113
Ensembl	ENSG00000181649; ENSG00000274538	ENSMUSG00000010760
UniProt	Q53GA4	O08969
RefSeq (mRNA)	NM_003311	NM_009434
RefSeq (protein)	NP_003302	NP_033460
Location (UCSC)	Chr 11: 2.93 – 2.93 Mb	Chr 7: 143.06 – 143.06 Mb
PubMed search
- Wikidata
View/Edit Human	View/Edit Mouse

Pleckstrin homology-like domain family A member 2 is a protein that in humans is encoded by the PHLDA2 gene.

This gene is one of several genes in the imprinted gene domain of 11p15.5, which is considered to be an important tumor suppressor gene region. Alterations in this region may be associated with the Beckwith-Wiedemann syndrome, Wilms tumor, rhabdomyosarcoma, adrenocortical carcinoma, and lung, ovarian, and breast cancer. Studies of the mouse gene, however, which is also located in an imprinted gene domain, have shown that the product of this gene regulates placental growth.
