= APPL2 =

Protein-coding gene in the species Homo sapiens

Identifiers
- Aliases: APPL2, DIP13B, adaptor protein, phosphotyrosine interacting with PH domain and leucine zipper 2
- External IDs: OMIM: 606231; MGI: 2384914; GeneCards: APPL2
Available structures
PDB	Ortholog search: PDBe RCSB
PDB	List of PDB id codes 4H8S, 5C5B

Gene location (Human)
Chr.	Chromosome 12 (human)
Band	12q23.3	Start	105,173,297 bp
Band	12q23.3	End	105,236,203 bp

Gene location (Mouse)
Chr.	Chromosome 10 (mouse)
Band	10|10 C1	Start	83,435,897 bp
Band	10|10 C1	End	83,484,602 bp
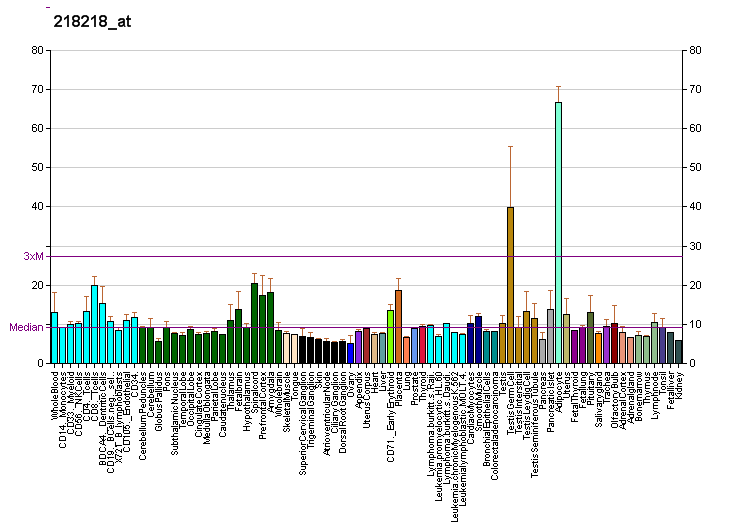
RNA expression pattern
Bgee	Human / Mouse (ortholog); Top expressed in: skin of leg; skin of abdomen; rectum; mucosa of transverse colon; ventricular zone; Achilles tendon; stromal cell of endometrium; canal of the cervix; ectocervix; bronchial epithelial cell / Top expressed in: retinal pigment epithelium; ciliary body; iris; cerebellar cortex; neural layer of retina; parotid gland; lobe of cerebellum; cerebellar vermis; lacrimal gland; epithelium of stomach; More reference expression data
BioGPS	More reference expression data
Gene ontology
Molecular function	protein binding; phosphatidylserine binding; phosphatidylinositol binding; protein homodimerization activity; protein-containing complex binding
Cellular component	cytoplasm; NuRD complex; endosome; early endosome membrane; endosome membrane; extracellular exosome; membrane; nucleus; ruffle; plasma membrane; cytoplasmic vesicle; vesicle; early phagosome; ruffle membrane; early phagosome membrane; macropinosome; phagocytic vesicle membrane; cell projection; phagocytic vesicle
Biological process	cell cycle; cell population proliferation; signal transduction; diet induced thermogenesis; transforming growth factor beta receptor signaling pathway; cold acclimation; regulation of fibroblast migration; signaling; adiponectin-activated signaling pathway; regulation of toll-like receptor 4 signaling pathway; cellular response to hepatocyte growth factor stimulus; glucose homeostasis; regulation of innate immune response; negative regulation of fatty acid oxidation; negative regulation of glucose import; negative regulation of neurogenesis; protein homotetramerization; positive regulation of phagocytosis, engulfment; positive regulation of cold-induced thermogenesis; negative regulation of cytokine production involved in inflammatory response; negative regulation of cellular response to insulin stimulus; positive regulation of macropinocytosis; positive regulation of Fc-gamma receptor signaling pathway involved in phagocytosis; negative regulation of neural precursor cell proliferation; protein import into nucleus
Sources:Amigo / QuickGO
Orthologs
Databases	NCBI: entry; OMA: entry
Species	Human	Mouse
Entrez	55198	216190
Ensembl	ENSG00000136044	ENSMUSG00000020263
UniProt	Q8NEU8	Q8K3G9
RefSeq (mRNA)	NM_001251904; NM_001251905; NM_018171	NM_145220
RefSeq (protein)	NP_001238833; NP_001238834; NP_060641	NP_660255
Location (UCSC)	Chr 12: 105.17 – 105.24 Mb	Chr 10: 83.44 – 83.48 Mb
PubMed search
- Wikidata
View/Edit Human	View/Edit Mouse

DCC-interacting protein 13-beta is a protein that in humans is encoded by the APPL2 gene.
