= PSD3 =

Protein found in humans

Identifiers
- Aliases: PSD3, EFA6R, HCA67, EFA6D, pleckstrin and Sec7 domain containing 3
- External IDs: OMIM: 614440; MGI: 1918215; GeneCards: PSD3

Gene location (Human)
Chr.	Chromosome 8 (human)
Band	8p22	Start	18,527,303 bp
Band	8p22	End	19,084,730 bp

Gene location (Mouse)
Chr.	Chromosome 8 (mouse)
Band	8|8 B3.2-B3.3	Start	67,689,082 bp
Band	8|8 B3.2-B3.3	End	68,212,027 bp
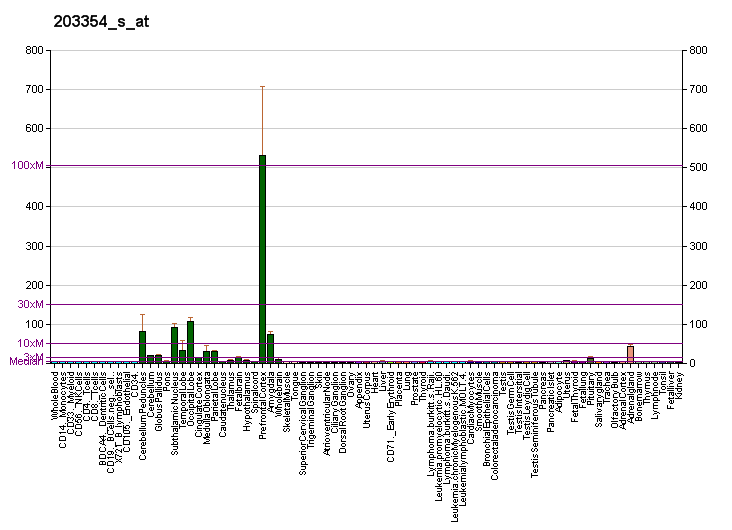

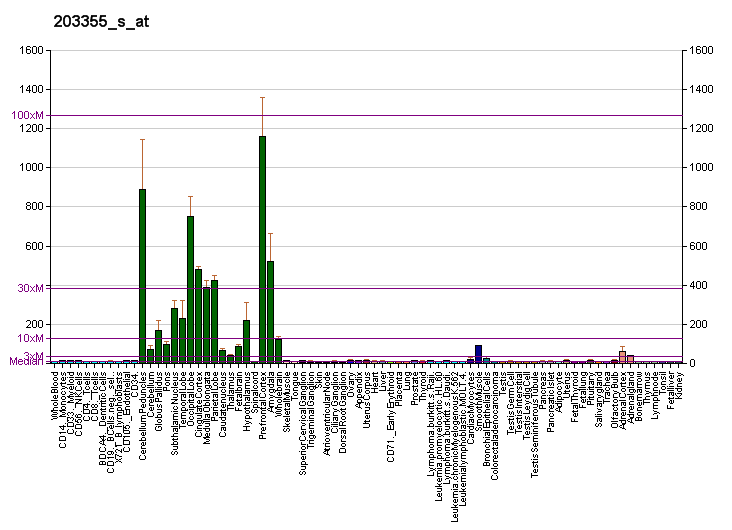
RNA expression pattern
Bgee	Human / Mouse (ortholog); Top expressed in: Brodmann area 23; endothelial cell; cerebellar vermis; middle temporal gyrus; lateral nuclear group of thalamus; parietal lobe; postcentral gyrus; entorhinal cortex; Achilles tendon; superior frontal gyrus / Top expressed in: subiculum; Region I of hippocampus proper; cingulate gyrus; primary motor cortex; anterior amygdaloid area; lobe of cerebellum; prefrontal cortex; cerebellar vermis; medial dorsal nucleus; mammillary body; More reference expression data
BioGPS	More reference expression data
Gene ontology
Molecular function	guanyl-nucleotide exchange factor activity
Cellular component	synapse; membrane; cell junction; postsynaptic density; postsynaptic membrane; plasma membrane; ruffle membrane; cell projection
Biological process	regulation of ARF protein signal transduction
Sources:Amigo / QuickGO
Orthologs
Databases	NCBI: entry; OMA: entry
Species	Human	Mouse
Entrez	23362	234353
Ensembl	ENSG00000156011	ENSMUSG00000030465
UniProt	Q9NYI0	Q2PFD7
RefSeq (mRNA)	NM_015310; NM_206909; NM_001362819	NM_027626; NM_030263; NM_177698
RefSeq (protein)	NP_056125; NP_996792; NP_001349748	NP_081902; NP_084539; NP_808366
Location (UCSC)	Chr 8: 18.53 – 19.08 Mb	Chr 8: 67.69 – 68.21 Mb
PubMed search
- Wikidata
View/Edit Human	View/Edit Mouse

PH and SEC7 domain-containing protein 3 is a protein that in humans is encoded by the PSD3 gene.
