= SWAP70 =

Protein-coding gene in the species Homo sapiens

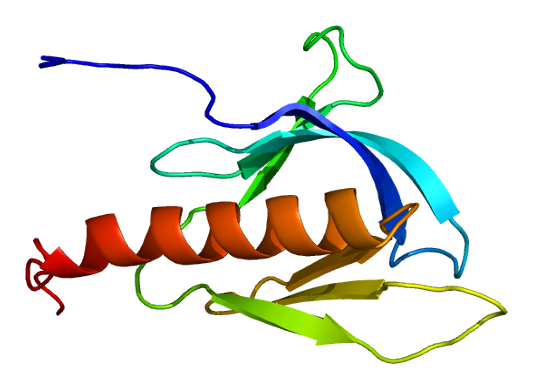

Identifiers
- Aliases: SWAP70, SWAP-70, HSPC321, SWAP switching B-cell complex 70kDa subunit, SWAP switching B-cell complex subunit 70, switching B-cell complex subunit switching B cell complex subunit SWAP70
- External IDs: OMIM: 604762; MGI: 1298390; GeneCards: SWAP70
Available structures
PDB	Ortholog search: PDBe RCSB
PDB	List of PDB id codes 2DN6

Gene location (Human)
Chr.	Chromosome 11 (human)
Band	11p15.4	Start	9,664,077 bp
Band	11p15.4	End	9,752,993 bp

Gene location (Mouse)
Chr.	Chromosome 7 (mouse)
Band	7 E3|7 57.7 cM	Start	109,820,918 bp
Band	7 E3|7 57.7 cM	End	109,882,713 bp
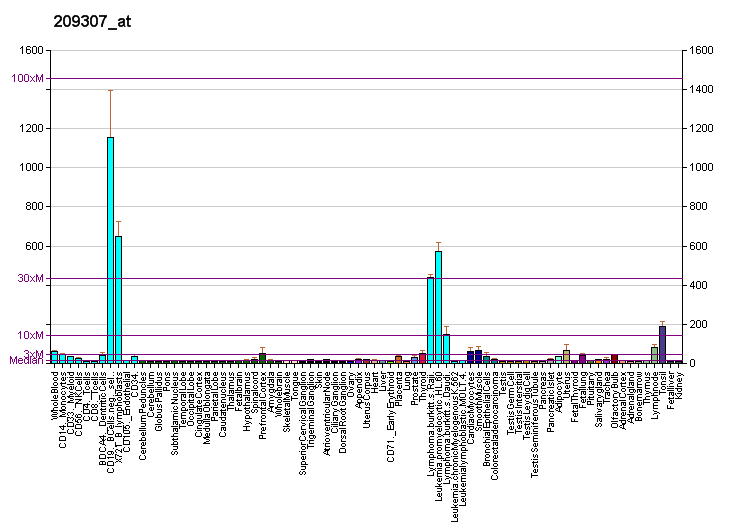

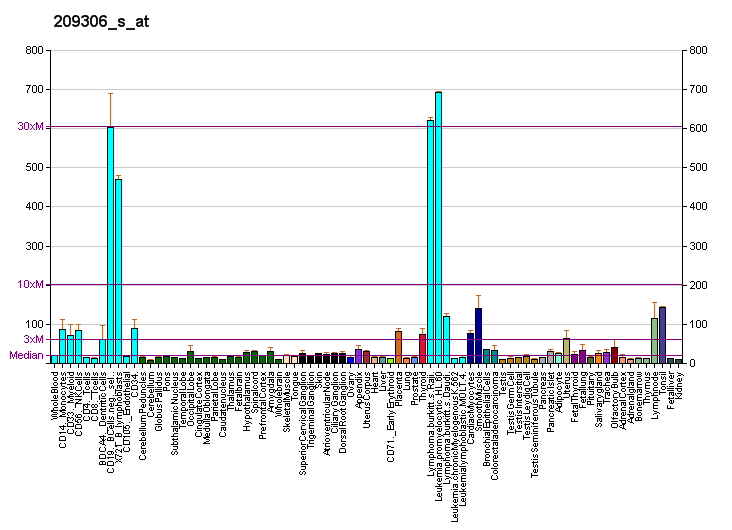
RNA expression pattern
Bgee	Human / Mouse (ortholog); Top expressed in: Achilles tendon; amniotic fluid; sural nerve; cartilage tissue; visceral pleura; lower lobe of lung; parietal pleura; epithelium of nasopharynx; palpebral conjunctiva; tibia / Top expressed in: mesenteric lymph nodes; decidua; spleen; right lung lobe; blood; left lung lobe; stroma of bone marrow; calvaria; lumbar spinal ganglion; femur; More reference expression data
BioGPS	More reference expression data
Gene ontology
Molecular function	DNA binding; calcium ion binding; protein binding; ATP binding; cadherin binding
Cellular component	cell projection; membrane; plasma membrane; cytoskeleton; nucleus; lamellipodium; cytoplasm
Biological process	positive regulation of cytosolic calcium ion concentration; positive regulation of mast cell chemotaxis; negative regulation of peptidyl-serine dephosphorylation; negative regulation of actin filament depolymerization; actin filament bundle assembly; regulation of protein localization; regulation of actin polymerization or depolymerization; somatic cell DNA recombination; isotype switching; positive regulation of actin filament bundle assembly; negative regulation of cell-cell adhesion mediated by integrin
Sources:Amigo / QuickGO
Orthologs
Databases	NCBI: entry; OMA: entry
Species	Human	Mouse
Entrez	23075	20947
Ensembl	ENSG00000133789	ENSMUSG00000031015
UniProt	Q9UH65	Q6A028
RefSeq (mRNA)	NM_001297714; NM_015055	NM_009302
RefSeq (protein)	NP_001284643; NP_055870	NP_033328
Location (UCSC)	Chr 11: 9.66 – 9.75 Mb	Chr 7: 109.82 – 109.88 Mb
PubMed search
- Wikidata
View/Edit Human	View/Edit Mouse

Switch-associated protein 70 is a protein that in humans and other mammals is encoded by the SWAP70 gene.
