= RALGPS1 =

Protein-coding gene in humans

Identifiers
- Aliases: RALGPS1, RALGEF2, RALGPS1A, Ral GEF with PH domain and SH3 binding motif 1
- External IDs: OMIM: 614444; MGI: 1922008; GeneCards: RALGPS1
Available structures
PDB	Ortholog search: PDBe RCSB
PDB	List of PDB id codes 3QXL

Gene location (Human)
Chr.	Chromosome 9 (human)
Band	9q33.3	Start	126,914,774 bp
Band	9q33.3	End	127,223,166 bp

Gene location (Mouse)
Chr.	Chromosome 2 (mouse)
Band	2|2 B	Start	33,133,417 bp
Band	2|2 B	End	33,371,486 bp
RNA expression pattern
Bgee	Human / Mouse (ortholog); Top expressed in: jejunal mucosa; right hemisphere of cerebellum; C1 segment; duodenum; Brodmann area 23; cerebellar vermis; endothelial cell; primary visual cortex; ganglionic eminence; middle temporal gyrus / Top expressed in: lumbar subsegment of spinal cord; superior cervical ganglion; Rostral migratory stream; superior colliculus; spermatocyte; anterior amygdaloid area; visual cortex; primary visual cortex; ganglionic eminence; subiculum; More reference expression data
BioGPS	n/a
Gene ontology
Molecular function	guanyl-nucleotide exchange factor activity
Cellular component	cytoplasm; plasma membrane; membrane; cellular component
Biological process	small GTPase mediated signal transduction; intracellular signal transduction; regulation of Ral protein signal transduction
Sources:Amigo / QuickGO
Orthologs
Databases	NCBI: entry; OMA: entry
Species	Human	Mouse
Entrez	9649	241308
Ensembl	ENSG00000136828	ENSMUSG00000038831
UniProt	Q5JS13	A2AR50
RefSeq (mRNA)	NM_001190728; NM_001190729; NM_001190730; NM_014636; NM_001322320 NM_001322321; NM_001322322; NM_001322323; NM_001322324; NM_001322325; NM_001366399; NM_001366400; NM_001366401	NM_001290570; NM_001290572; NM_175211
RefSeq (protein)	NP_001177657; NP_001177658; NP_001177659; NP_001309249; NP_001309250 NP_001309251; NP_001309252; NP_001309253; NP_001309254; NP_055451; NP_001353328; NP_001353329; NP_001353330	NP_001277499; NP_001277501; NP_780420
Location (UCSC)	Chr 9: 126.91 – 127.22 Mb	Chr 2: 33.13 – 33.37 Mb
PubMed search
- Wikidata
View/Edit Human	View/Edit Mouse

Ral GEF with PH domain and SH3 binding motif 1 is a protein in humans that is encoded by the RALGPS1 gene in chromosome 9.
