= CYTH1 =

Protein-coding gene in the species Homo sapiens

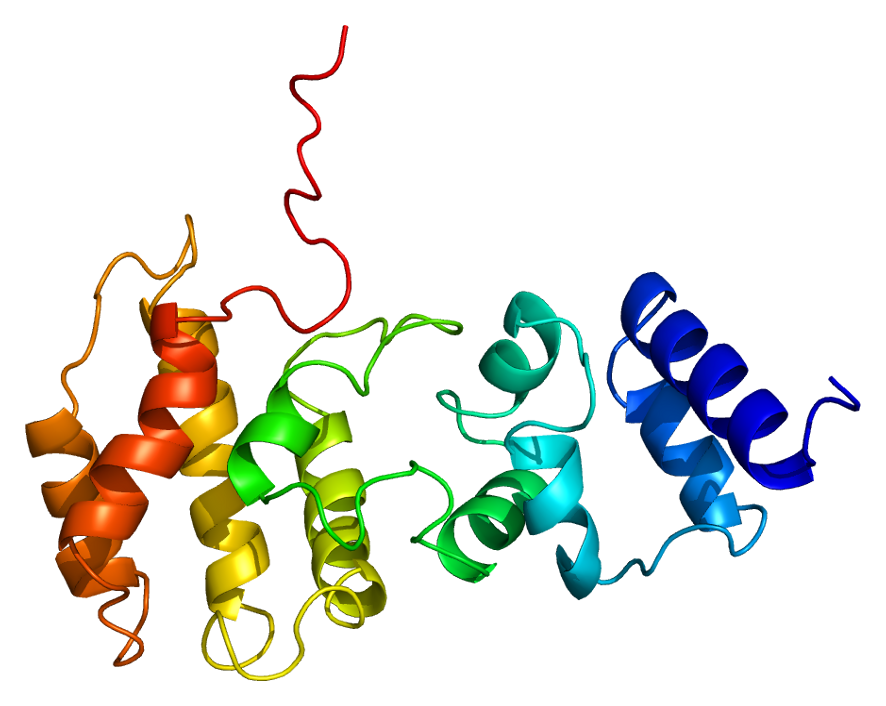

Identifiers
- Aliases: CYTH1, B2-1, CYTOHESIN-1, D17S811E, PSCD1, SEC7, cytohesin 1
- External IDs: OMIM: 182115; MGI: 1334257; GeneCards: CYTH1
Available structures
PDB	Ortholog search: PDBe RCSB
PDB	List of PDB id codes 1BC9, 4A4P

Gene location (Human)
Chr.	Chromosome 17 (human)
Band	17q25.3	Start	78,674,048 bp
Band	17q25.3	End	78,782,297 bp

Gene location (Mouse)
Chr.	Chromosome 11 (mouse)
Band	11|11 E2	Start	118,022,845 bp
Band	11|11 E2	End	118,139,418 bp
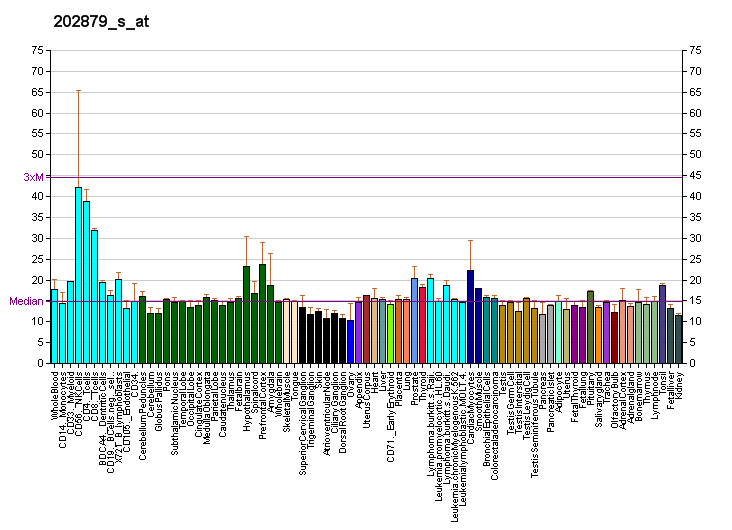

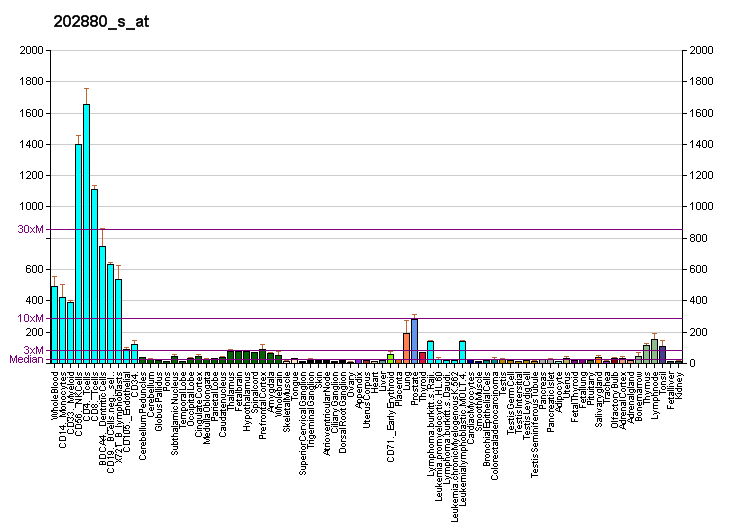
RNA expression pattern
Bgee	Human / Mouse (ortholog); Top expressed in: granulocyte; blood; monocyte; corpus callosum; lymph node; bone marrow cell; spleen; C1 segment; appendix; middle frontal gyrus / Top expressed in: vestibular membrane of cochlear duct; Rostral migratory stream; motor neuron; neural layer of retina; lumbar spinal ganglion; dentate gyrus of hippocampal formation granule cell; barrel cortex; submandibular gland; cerebellar cortex; nucleus accumbens; More reference expression data
BioGPS	More reference expression data
Gene ontology
Molecular function	protein binding; guanyl-nucleotide exchange factor activity; lipid binding
Cellular component	cytoplasm; extrinsic component of cytoplasmic side of plasma membrane; plasma membrane; membrane; cytosol; Golgi membrane; adherens junction; bicellular tight junction; cell junction
Biological process	regulation of ARF protein signal transduction; regulation of cell adhesion; vesicle-mediated transport; establishment of epithelial cell polarity
Sources:Amigo / QuickGO
Orthologs
Databases	NCBI: entry; OMA: entry
Species	Human	Mouse
Entrez	9267	19157
Ensembl	ENSG00000108669	ENSMUSG00000017132
UniProt	Q15438	Q9QX11
RefSeq (mRNA)	NM_001292018; NM_001292019; NM_004762; NM_017456; NM_001365037 NM_001365038; NM_001365039; NM_001365040; NM_001365041; NM_001394676; NM_001394677; NM_001394678	NM_001112699; NM_001112700; NM_011180; NM_001378885; NM_001378886 NM_001378887; NM_001378888
RefSeq (protein)	NP_001278947; NP_001278948; NP_004753; NP_059430; NP_001351966 NP_001351967; NP_001351968; NP_001351969; NP_001351970	NP_001106169; NP_001106170; NP_035310; NP_001365814; NP_001365815 NP_001365816; NP_001365817
Location (UCSC)	Chr 17: 78.67 – 78.78 Mb	Chr 11: 118.02 – 118.14 Mb
PubMed search
- Wikidata
View/Edit Human	View/Edit Mouse

Cytohesin-1 formerly known as Pleckstrin homology, Sec7 and coiled/coil domains 1 (PSCD1) is a protein that in humans is encoded by the CYTH1 gene.

== Function ==
Cytohesin-1 (CYTH1) is a member of the cytohesin family. Members of this family have identical structural organization that consists of an N-terminal coiled-coil motif, a central Sec7 domain, and a C-terminal pleckstrin homology (PH) domain. The coiled-coil motif is involved in homodimerization, the Sec7 domain contains guanine-nucleotide exchange protein (GEP) activity, and the PH domain interacts with phospholipids and is responsible for association of CYTHs with membranes. Members of this family appear to mediate the regulation of protein sorting and membrane trafficking. The CYTH1 is highly expressed in natural killer and peripheral T cells, and regulates the adhesiveness of integrins at the plasma membrane of lymphocytes. CYTH1 protein is 83% homologous to CYTH2.

== Interactions ==
CYTH1 has been shown to interact with:

- ARFRP1,
- CD18, and
- TRIM23.
