= ARHGAP25 =

Protein-coding gene in humans

Identifiers
- Aliases: ARHGAP25, HEL-S-308, KAIA0053, Rho GTPase activating protein 25
- External IDs: OMIM: 610587; MGI: 2443687; GeneCards: ARHGAP25
Available structures
PDB	Ortholog search: PDBe RCSB
PDB	List of PDB id codes 1V89

Gene location (Human)
Chr.	Chromosome 2 (human)
Band	2p13.3	Start	68,679,601 bp
Band	2p13.3	End	68,826,833 bp

Gene location (Mouse)
Chr.	Chromosome 6 (mouse)
Band	6|6 D1	Start	87,435,527 bp
Band	6|6 D1	End	87,510,241 bp
RNA expression pattern
Bgee	Human / Mouse (ortholog); Top expressed in: granulocyte; blood; spleen; lymph node; monocyte; bone marrow cell; appendix; periodontal fiber; tonsil; epithelium of colon / Top expressed in: granulocyte; mesenteric lymph nodes; spleen; thymus; bone marrow; blood; lumbar spinal ganglion; stroma of bone marrow; subcutaneous adipose tissue; middle ear; More reference expression data
BioGPS	n/a
Gene ontology
Molecular function	GTPase activator activity
Cellular component	cytosol; phagocytic cup
Biological process	positive regulation of GTPase activity; regulation of small GTPase mediated signal transduction; signal transduction; phagocytosis, engulfment; actin filament organization; negative regulation of small GTPase mediated signal transduction
Sources:Amigo / QuickGO
Orthologs
Databases	NCBI: entry; OMA: entry
Species	Human	Mouse
Entrez	9938	232201
Ensembl	ENSG00000163219	ENSMUSG00000030047
UniProt	P42331	Q8BYW1
RefSeq (mRNA)	NM_001007231; NM_001166276; NM_001166277; NM_014882; NM_001364819 NM_001364820; NM_001364821	NM_001037727; NM_001286610; NM_175476
RefSeq (protein)	NP_001007232; NP_001159748; NP_001159749; NP_055697; NP_001351748 NP_001351749; NP_001351750	NP_001032816; NP_001273539; NP_780685
Location (UCSC)	Chr 2: 68.68 – 68.83 Mb	Chr 6: 87.44 – 87.51 Mb
PubMed search
- Wikidata
View/Edit Human	View/Edit Mouse

Rho GTPase activating protein 25 is a protein that in humans is encoded by the ARHGAP25 gene. The gene is also known as KAIA0053. ARHGAP25 belongs to a family of Rho GTPase-modulating proteins that are implicated in actin remodeling, cell polarity, and cell migration.
