= NET1 =

Protein-coding gene in the species Homo sapiens

Identifiers
- Aliases: NET1, ARHGEF8, NET1A, neuroepithelial cell transforming 1
- External IDs: OMIM: 606450; MGI: 1927138; GeneCards: NET1
Available structures
PDB	Ortholog search: PDBe RCSB
PDB	List of PDB id codes 3EO2, 4XH9

Gene location (Human)
Chr.	Chromosome 10 (human)
Band	10p15.1	Start	5,412,557 bp
Band	10p15.1	End	5,459,056 bp

Gene location (Mouse)
Chr.	Chromosome 13 (mouse)
Band	13|13 A1	Start	3,932,018 bp
Band	13|13 A1	End	3,968,220 bp
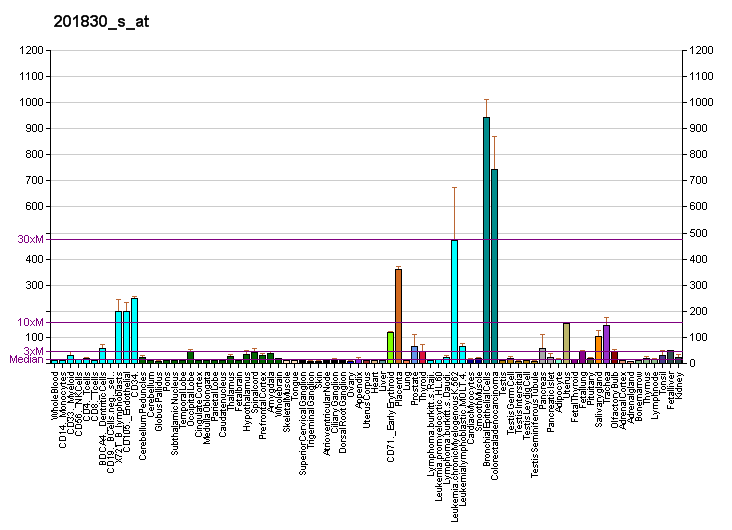

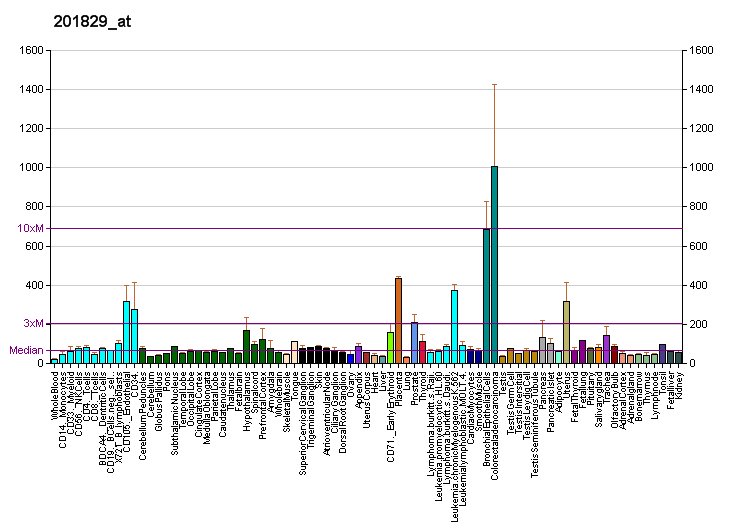
RNA expression pattern
Bgee	Human / Mouse (ortholog); Top expressed in: tendon of biceps brachii; mucosa of paranasal sinus; mucosa of pharynx; Descending thoracic aorta; palpebral conjunctiva; pericardium; pylorus; cardia; urethra; superior surface of tongue / Top expressed in: epithelium of small intestine; lip; genital tubercle; tail of embryo; intestinal villus; esophagus; muscle of thigh; decidua; skin of external ear; yolk sac; More reference expression data
BioGPS	More reference expression data
Gene ontology
Molecular function	guanyl-nucleotide exchange factor activity; protein binding
Cellular component	cytoplasm; cytosol; plasma membrane; nucleus; intracellular anatomical structure
Biological process	cellular response to ionizing radiation; positive regulation of GTPase activity; myoblast migration; positive regulation of substrate adhesion-dependent cell spreading; regulation of Rho protein signal transduction; intracellular signal transduction; regulation of small GTPase mediated signal transduction; regulation of cell growth; signal transduction; cellular response to hydrogen peroxide; positive regulation of apoptotic process; G protein-coupled receptor signaling pathway
Sources:Amigo / QuickGO
Orthologs
Databases	NCBI: entry; OMA: entry
Species	Human	Mouse
Entrez	10276	56349
Ensembl	ENSG00000173848	ENSMUSG00000021215
UniProt	Q7Z628; Q5SQI7	Q9Z206
RefSeq (mRNA)	NM_001047160; NM_005863	NM_001047159; NM_019671
RefSeq (protein)	NP_001040625; NP_005854; NP_005854.2	NP_001040624; NP_062645
Location (UCSC)	Chr 10: 5.41 – 5.46 Mb	Chr 13: 3.93 – 3.97 Mb
PubMed search
- Wikidata
View/Edit Human	View/Edit Mouse

Neuroepithelial cell-transforming gene 1 protein is a protein that in humans is encoded by the NET1 gene.
