= PLEKHA6 =

Protein-coding gene in humans

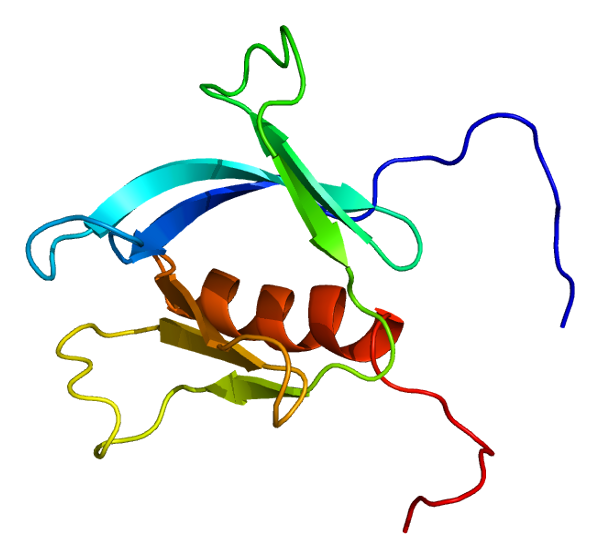

Identifiers
- Aliases: PLEKHA6, PEPP-3, PEPP3, pleckstrin homology domain containing A6
- External IDs: OMIM: 607771; MGI: 2388662; GeneCards: PLEKHA6
Available structures
PDB	Ortholog search: PDBe RCSB
PDB	List of PDB id codes 2D9Y, 2YRY

Gene location (Human)
Chr.	Chromosome 1 (human)
Band	1q32.1	Start	204,218,853 bp
Band	1q32.1	End	204,377,665 bp

Gene location (Mouse)
Chr.	Chromosome 1 (mouse)
Band	1|1 E4	Start	133,164,210 bp
Band	1|1 E4	End	133,303,435 bp
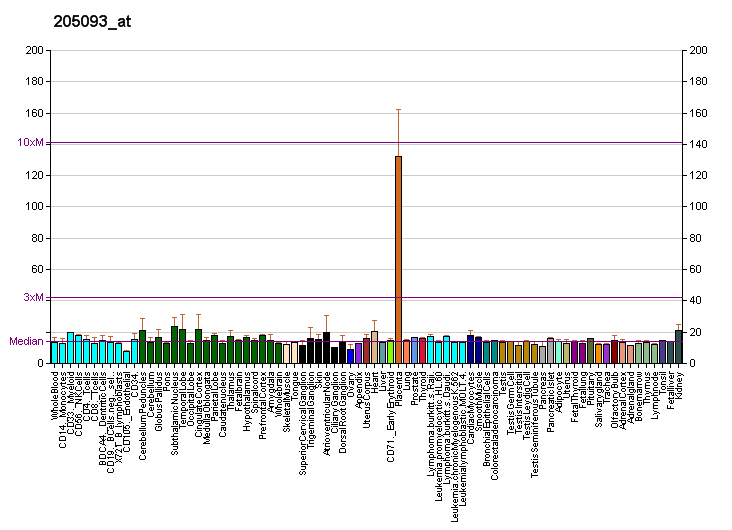
RNA expression pattern
Bgee	Human / Mouse (ortholog); Top expressed in: C1 segment; Brodmann area 23; right hemisphere of cerebellum; rectum; middle temporal gyrus; mucosa of transverse colon; endothelial cell; primary visual cortex; right frontal lobe; apex of heart / Top expressed in: interventricular septum; spermatid; neural layer of retina; zygote; visual cortex; primary visual cortex; right kidney; superior frontal gyrus; cerebellar cortex; deep cerebellar nuclei; More reference expression data
BioGPS	More reference expression data
Orthologs
Databases	NCBI: entry; OMA: entry
Species	Human	Mouse
Entrez	22874	240753
Ensembl	ENSG00000143850	ENSMUSG00000041757
UniProt	Q9Y2H5	Q7TQG1
RefSeq (mRNA)	NM_014935; NM_138480	NM_001160268; NM_182930
RefSeq (protein)	NP_055750	NP_001153740; NP_891846
Location (UCSC)	Chr 1: 204.22 – 204.38 Mb	Chr 1: 133.16 – 133.3 Mb
PubMed search
- Wikidata
View/Edit Human	View/Edit Mouse

Pleckstrin homology domain-containing family A member 6 is a protein that in humans is encoded by the PLEKHA6 gene.
