= PHLDB1 =

Protein-coding gene in the species Homo sapiens

Identifiers
- Aliases: PHLDB1, LL5A, pleckstrin homology like domain family B member 1
- External IDs: OMIM: 612834; MGI: 2143230; GeneCards: PHLDB1

Gene location (Human)
Chr.	Chromosome 11 (human)
Band	11q23.3	Start	118,606,440 bp
Band	11q23.3	End	118,658,031 bp

Gene location (Mouse)
Chr.	Chromosome 9 (mouse)
Band	9|9 A5.2	Start	44,686,304 bp
Band	9|9 A5.2	End	44,735,198 bp
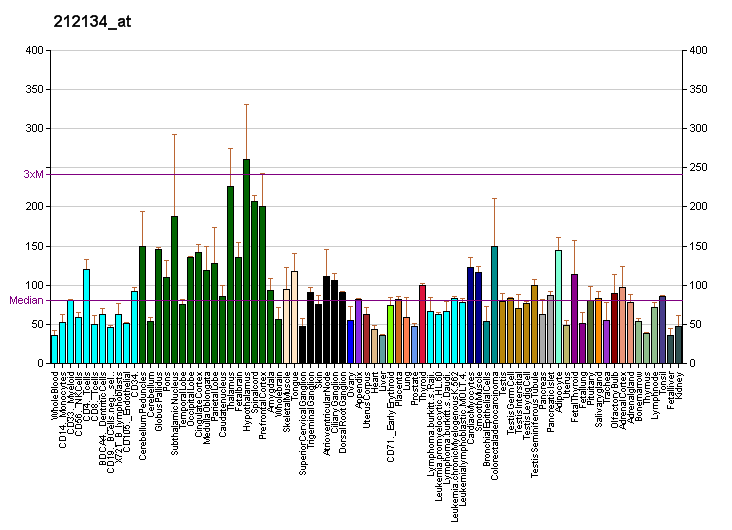
RNA expression pattern
Bgee	Human / Mouse (ortholog); Top expressed in: sural nerve; middle frontal gyrus; C1 segment; apex of heart; gastric mucosa; left uterine tube; canal of the cervix; corpus callosum; body of uterus; right auricle of heart / Top expressed in: saccule; otic vesicle; Rostral migratory stream; ankle joint; motor neuron; otic placode; molar; external carotid artery; calvaria; lip; More reference expression data
BioGPS	More reference expression data
Orthologs
Databases	NCBI: entry; OMA: entry
Species	Human	Mouse
Entrez	23187	102693
Ensembl	ENSG00000019144	ENSMUSG00000048537
UniProt	Q86UU1	Q6PDH0
RefSeq (mRNA)	NM_001144758; NM_001144759; NM_015157	NM_153537
RefSeq (protein)	NP_001138230; NP_001138231; NP_055972; NP_001138231.1	NP_705765
Location (UCSC)	Chr 11: 118.61 – 118.66 Mb	Chr 9: 44.69 – 44.74 Mb
PubMed search
- Wikidata
View/Edit Human	View/Edit Mouse

Pleckstrin homology-like domain family B member 1 is a protein that in humans is encoded by the PHLDB1 gene.

The first PHLDB1 cDNA was cloned from a rat pituitary cDNA library and named as LL5 after the clone number.
