= MCF2L =

Gene found in humans

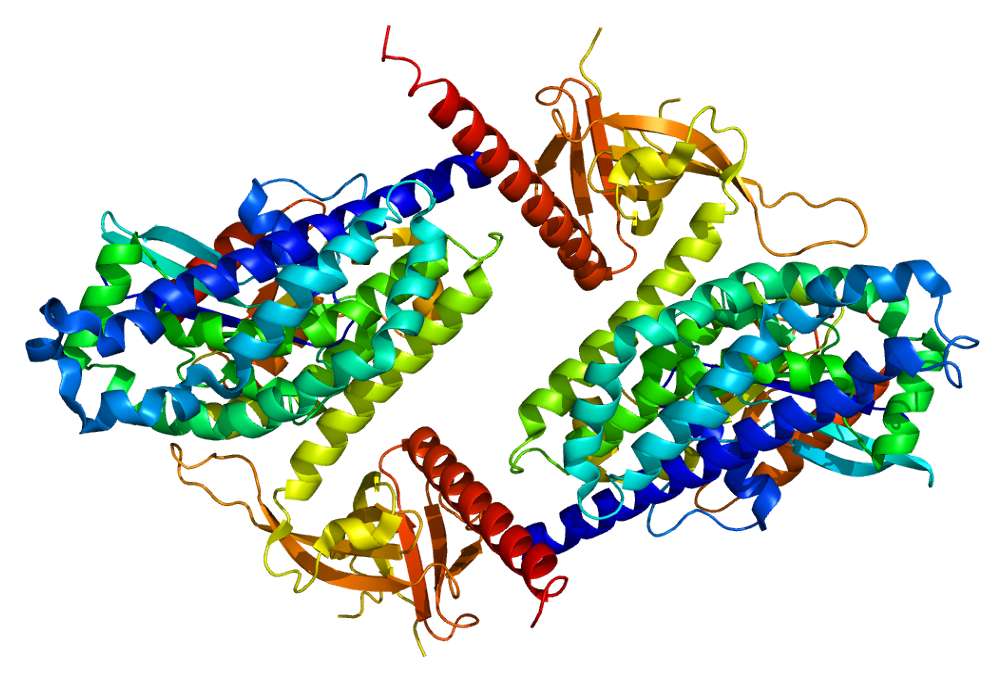

Identifiers
- Aliases: MCF2L, ARHGEF14, DBS, OST, MCF.2 cell line derived transforming sequence like
- External IDs: OMIM: 609499; MGI: 103263; GeneCards: MCF2L
Available structures
PDB	Ortholog search: PDBe RCSB
PDB	List of PDB id codes 1KZ7, 1KZG, 1LB1, 1RJ2

Gene location (Human)
Chr.	Chromosome 13 (human)
Band	13q34	Start	112,894,378 bp
Band	13q34	End	113,099,742 bp

Gene location (Mouse)
Chr.	Chromosome 8 (mouse)
Band	8|8 A1.1	Start	12,873,806 bp
Band	8|8 A1.1	End	13,020,905 bp
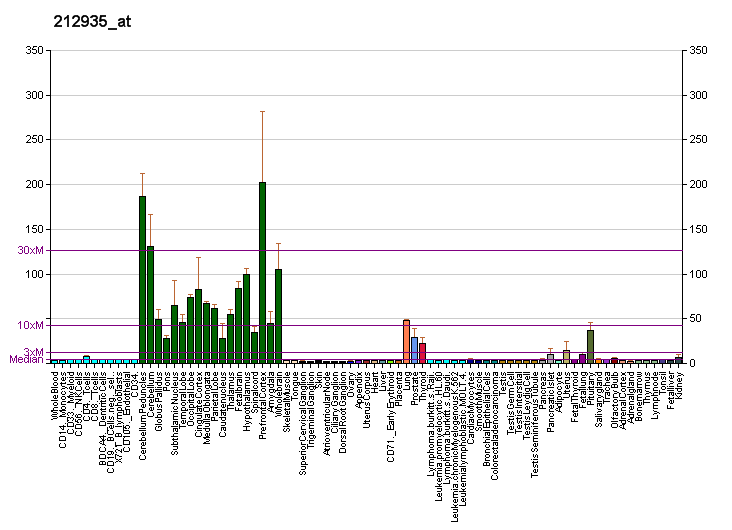

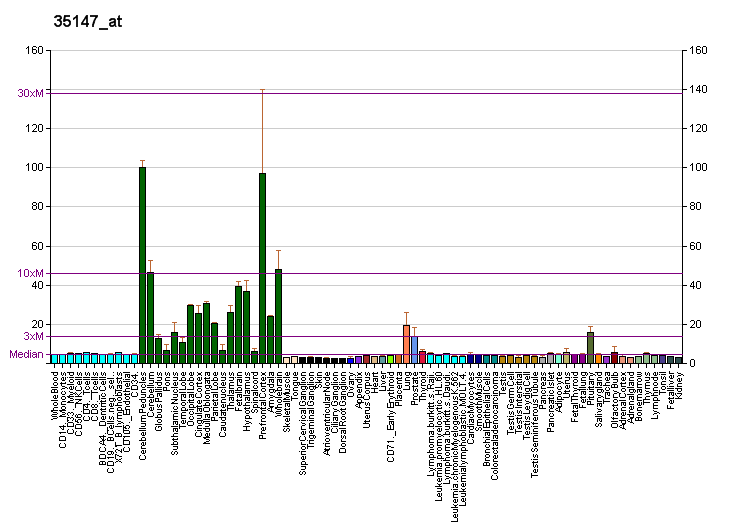
RNA expression pattern
Bgee	Human / Mouse (ortholog); Top expressed in: right hemisphere of cerebellum; right frontal lobe; paraflocculus of cerebellum; pituitary gland; apex of heart; anterior pituitary; C1 segment; Brodmann area 9; prefrontal cortex; primary visual cortex / Top expressed in: olfactory epithelium; neural layer of retina; cerebellar cortex; primary visual cortex; superior frontal gyrus; dentate gyrus of hippocampal formation granule cell; pituitary gland; lobe of cerebellum; cerebellar vermis; islet of Langerhans; More reference expression data
BioGPS	More reference expression data
Gene ontology
Molecular function	phosphatidylinositol binding; lipid binding; guanyl-nucleotide exchange factor activity
Cellular component	cytoplasm; extrinsic component of cytoplasmic side of plasma membrane; cytosol; plasma membrane; membrane; endomembrane system; extracellular space
Biological process	positive regulation of Rho protein signal transduction; regulation of Rho protein signal transduction; intracellular signal transduction; regulation of small GTPase mediated signal transduction; positive regulation of apoptotic process; G protein-coupled receptor signaling pathway; regulation of molecular function
Sources:Amigo / QuickGO
Orthologs
Databases	NCBI: entry; OMA: entry
Species	Human	Mouse
Entrez	23263	17207
Ensembl	ENSG00000126217	ENSMUSG00000031442
UniProt	O15068	Q64096
RefSeq (mRNA)	NM_001112732; NM_024979; NM_001320815; NM_001320816; NM_001320817 NM_001366644; NM_001366645; NM_001366646	NM_001159485; NM_001159486; NM_178076
RefSeq (protein)	NP_001106203; NP_001307744; NP_001307745; NP_001307746; NP_079255 NP_001353573; NP_001353574; NP_001353575	n/a
Location (UCSC)	Chr 13: 112.89 – 113.1 Mb	Chr 8: 12.87 – 13.02 Mb
PubMed search
- Wikidata
View/Edit Human	View/Edit Mouse

Guanine nucleotide exchange factor DBS is a protein that in humans is encoded by the MCF2L gene.
