= PLEKHB2 =

Protein-coding gene in the species Homo sapiens

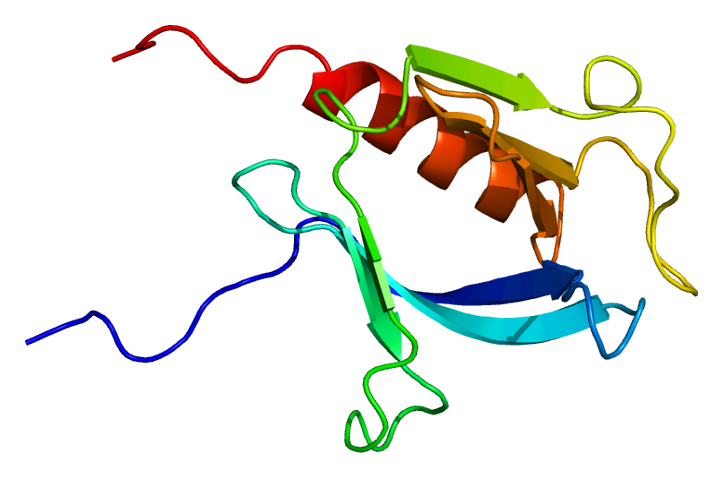

Identifiers
- Aliases: PLEKHB2, EVT2, pleckstrin homology domain containing B2
- External IDs: OMIM: 618452; MGI: 2385825; GeneCards: PLEKHB2
Available structures
| PDB | Ortholog search: PDBe RCSB |
| PDB | List of PDB id codes 3AJ4, 3VIA |

Gene location (Human)
| Chr. | Chromosome 2 (human) |
| Band | 2q21.1 | Start | 131,104,847 bp |
| Band | 2q21.1 | End | 131,353,709 bp |

Gene location (Mouse)
| Chr. | Chromosome 1 (mouse) |
| Band | 1|1 B | Start | 34,889,057 bp |
| Band | 1|1 B | End | 34,918,661 bp |
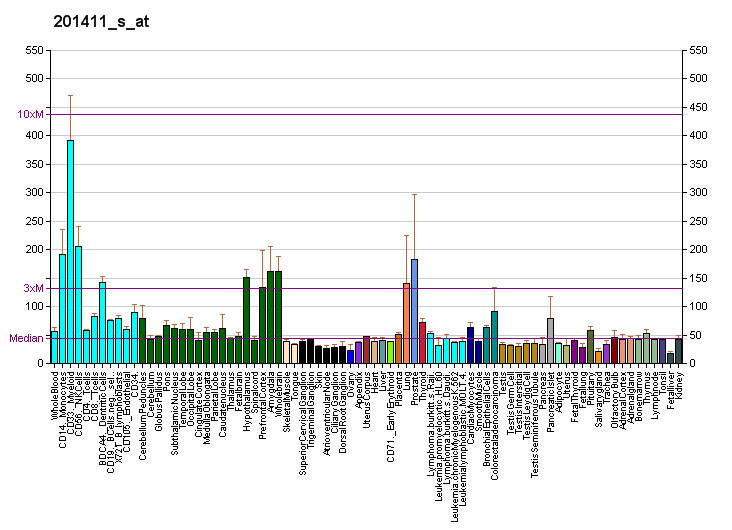

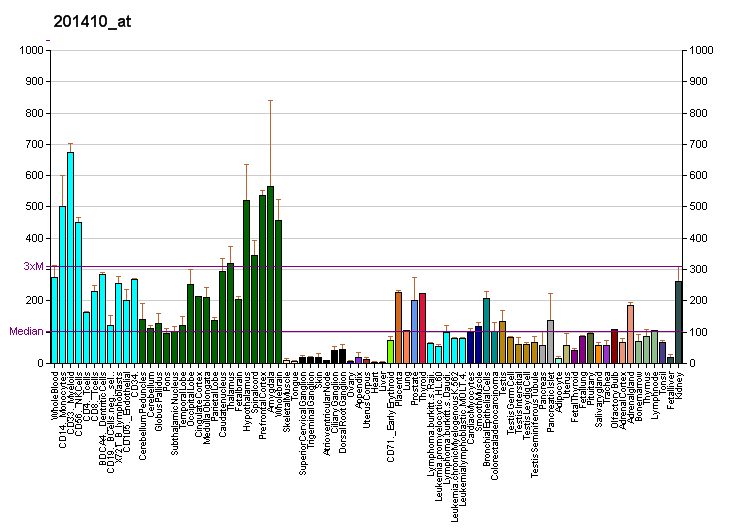
RNA expression pattern
| Bgee | Human / Mouse (ortholog); Top expressed in: pons; endothelial cell; superior vestibular nucleus; inferior ganglion of vagus nerve; pars compacta; Brodmann area 23; cerebellar vermis; spinal ganglia; lateral nuclear group of thalamus; pars reticulata / Top expressed in: choroid plexus of fourth ventricle; medulla oblongata; superior colliculus; medial vestibular nucleus; entorhinal cortex; perirhinal cortex; neural layer of retina; pyloric antrum; dorsal tegmental nucleus; right kidney; More reference expression data |
| BioGPS | More reference expression data |
Gene ontology
| Molecular function | protein binding; phosphatidylinositol-3,4,5-trisphosphate binding |
| Cellular component | membrane; recycling endosome membrane; endosome; integral component of membrane |
| Biological process | regulation of cell differentiation |
Sources:Amigo / QuickGO
Orthologs
| Databases | NCBI: entry; OMA: entry |
| Species | Human | Mouse |
| Entrez | 55041 | 226971 |
| Ensembl | ENSG00000115762 | ENSMUSG00000026123 |
| UniProt | Q96CS7 | Q9QZC7 |
| RefSeq (mRNA) | NM_001031706; NM_001100623; NM_001267062; NM_001267063; NM_001267064 NM_001267065; NM_001267066; NM_001267067; NM_001267068; NM_001309448; NM_001309450; NM_001309451; NM_001309452; NM_017958 | NM_145516; NM_175421; NM_001357425 |
| RefSeq (protein) | NP_001094093; NP_001253991; NP_001253992; NP_001253993; NP_001253994 NP_001253995; NP_001253996; NP_001253997; NP_001296377; NP_001296379; NP_001296380; NP_001296381; NP_060428; NP_001094093.1 | NP_663491; NP_780630; NP_001344354 |
| Location (UCSC) | Chr 2: 131.1 – 131.35 Mb | Chr 1: 34.89 – 34.92 Mb |
| PubMed search |
- Wikidata
| View/Edit Human | View/Edit Mouse |

Pleckstrin homology domain-containing family B member 2 is a protein that in humans is encoded by the PLEKHB2 gene.
