= PLEKHM2 =

Protein-coding gene in humans

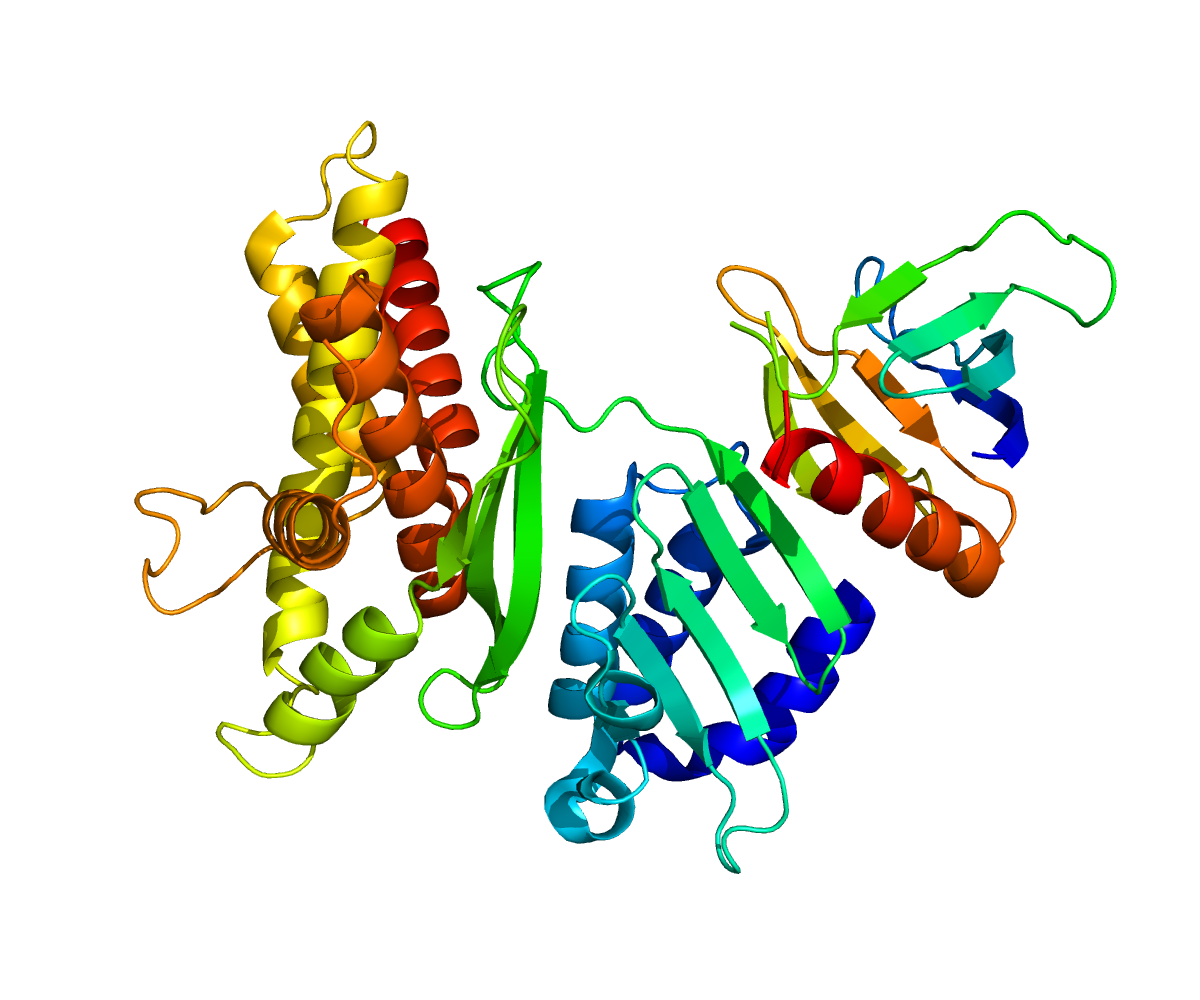

Identifiers
- Aliases: PLEKHM2, SKIP, pleckstrin homology and RUN domain containing M2
- External IDs: OMIM: 609613; MGI: 1916832; GeneCards: PLEKHM2
Available structures
PDB	Ortholog search: PDBe RCSB
PDB	List of PDB id codes 3CXB, 3HW2, 3ZFW

Gene location (Human)
Chr.	Chromosome 1 (human)
Band	1p36.21	Start	15,684,320 bp
Band	1p36.21	End	15,734,769 bp

Gene location (Mouse)
Chr.	Chromosome 4 (mouse)
Band	4|4 D3	Start	141,353,045 bp
Band	4|4 D3	End	141,392,210 bp
RNA expression pattern
Bgee	Human / Mouse (ortholog); Top expressed in: right frontal lobe; apex of heart; cingulate gyrus; anterior cingulate cortex; gastrocnemius muscle; muscle of thigh; prefrontal cortex; right hemisphere of cerebellum; stromal cell of endometrium; Brodmann area 9 / Top expressed in: interventricular septum; primary visual cortex; superior frontal gyrus; muscle of thigh; cerebellar cortex; genital tubercle; lip; spermatid; dentate gyrus of hippocampal formation granule cell; neural layer of retina; More reference expression data
BioGPS	n/a
Gene ontology
Molecular function	protein binding; kinesin binding
Cellular component	cytoplasm; endosome membrane
Biological process	positive regulation of membrane tubulation; Golgi organization; regulation of protein localization; lysosome localization
Sources:Amigo / QuickGO
Orthologs
Databases	NCBI: entry; OMA: entry
Species	Human	Mouse
Entrez	23207	69582
Ensembl	ENSG00000116786	ENSMUSG00000028917
UniProt	Q8IWE5	Q80TQ5
RefSeq (mRNA)	NM_015164	NM_001033150; NM_001347237
RefSeq (protein)	NP_055979	NP_001028322; NP_001334166
Location (UCSC)	Chr 1: 15.68 – 15.73 Mb	Chr 4: 141.35 – 141.39 Mb
PubMed search
- Wikidata
View/Edit Human	View/Edit Mouse

Pleckstrin homology domain-containing family M member 2 is a protein that in humans is encoded by the PLEKHM2 gene.
