= APBB1IP =

Protein-coding gene in the species Homo sapiens

Identifiers
- Aliases: APBB1IP, amyloid beta (A4) precursor protein-binding, family B, member 1 interacting protein, INAG1, PREL1, RARP1, RIAM, amyloid beta precursor protein binding family B member 1 interacting protein
- External IDs: OMIM: 609036; MGI: 1861354; GeneCards: APBB1IP
Available structures
PDB	Ortholog search: PDBe RCSB
PDB	List of PDB id codes 2MWN, 3ZDL

Gene location (Human)
Chr.	Chromosome 10 (human)
Band	10p12.1	Start	26,438,341 bp
Band	10p12.1	End	26,567,803 bp

Gene location (Mouse)
Chr.	Chromosome 2 (mouse)
Band	2|2 A3	Start	22,664,106 bp
Band	2|2 A3	End	22,765,665 bp
RNA expression pattern
Bgee	Human / Mouse (ortholog); Top expressed in: blood; monocyte; granulocyte; inferior ganglion of vagus nerve; trabecular bone; spleen; synovial joint; lactiferous duct; lymph node; superficial temporal artery / Top expressed in: granulocyte; thymus; ankle joint; lactiferous gland; spleen; mesenteric lymph nodes; bone marrow; blood; molar; pharynx; More reference expression data
BioGPS	n/a
Gene ontology
Molecular function	protein binding
Cellular component	cytoplasm; cell junction; cell projection; T cell receptor complex; cytoskeleton; membrane; focal adhesion; lamellipodium; cytosol; plasma membrane
Biological process	T cell activation via T cell receptor contact with antigen bound to MHC molecule on antigen presenting cell; signal transduction; positive regulation of cell adhesion
Sources:Amigo / QuickGO
Orthologs
Databases	NCBI: entry; OMA: entry
Species	Human	Mouse
Entrez	54518	54519
Ensembl	ENSG00000077420	ENSMUSG00000026786
UniProt	Q7Z5R6	Q8R5A3
RefSeq (mRNA)	NM_019043	NM_019456
RefSeq (protein)	NP_061916	NP_062329
Location (UCSC)	Chr 10: 26.44 – 26.57 Mb	Chr 2: 22.66 – 22.77 Mb
PubMed search
- Wikidata
View/Edit Human	View/Edit Mouse

Amyloid beta A4 precursor protein-binding family B member 1-interacting protein (APBB1IP), also known as APBB1-interacting protein 1 or Rap1-GTP-interacting adapter molecule (RIAM) is a protein that in humans is encoded by the APBB1IP gene.
