= RhoGEF domain =

Protein domain

DH/PH RhoGEF domain
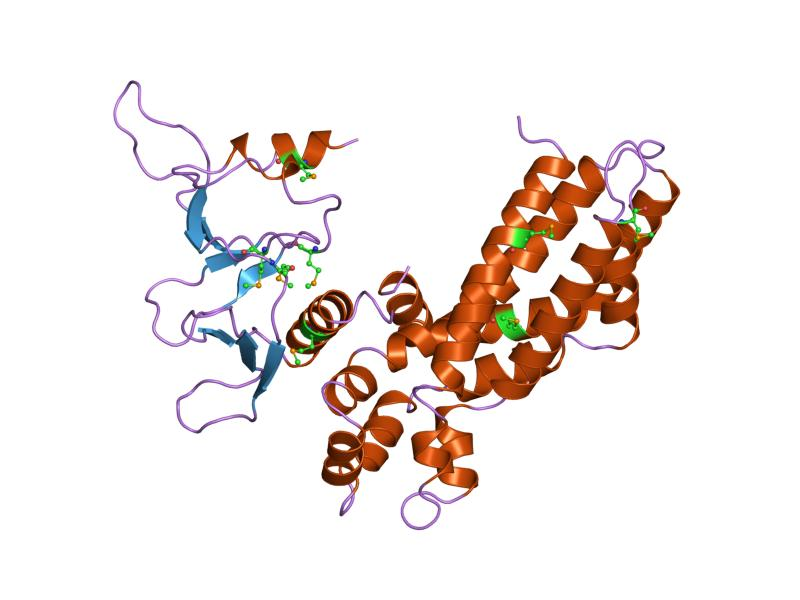
- Structure of the RhoGEF domain from the human Son of sevenless protein, an example of a DH/PH domain RhoGEF.

Identifiers
- Symbol: RhoGEF
- Pfam: PF00621
- InterPro: IPR035899 IPR000219, IPR035899
- SMART: RhoGEF
- SCOP2: 1dbh / SCOPe / SUPFAM
- OPM protein: 1xd4
- CDD: cd00160
Available protein structures:
- Pfam: structures / ECOD
- PDB: RCSB PDB; PDBe; PDBj
- PDBsum: structure summary
- PDB: 1foeE:1044-1233 1f5xA:198-372 1ki1D:1241-1422 1ntyA:1237-1407 1kzgC:636-811 1lb1C:636-811 1kz7C:636-811 1rj2D:511-686 1xcgE:738-922 1txdA:791-976 1x86E:791-976 1by1A:275-450 1dbhA:204-389 1xdvB:204-389 1xd4A:204-389

Dedicator of cytokinesis (DOCK) RhoGEF domain

Identifiers
- Symbol: RhoGEF
- Pfam: PF06920
- InterPro: IPR010703 IPR026791, IPR010703
- SCOP2: 1wg7 / SCOPe / SUPFAM
- CDD: cd11684
Available protein structures:
- Pfam: structures / ECOD
- PDB: RCSB PDB; PDBe; PDBj
- PDBsum: structure summary
- PDB: 1wg7

RhoGEF domain describes two distinct structural domains with guanine nucleotide exchange factor (GEF) activity to regulate small GTPases in the Rho family. Rho small GTPases are inactive when bound to GDP but active when bound to GTP; RhoGEF domains in proteins are able to promote GDP release and GTP binding to activate specific Rho family members, including RhoA, Rac1 and Cdc42.

The largest class of RhoGEFs is composed of proteins containing the "Dbl-homology" (DH) domain, which almost always is found together with a pleckstrin-homology (PH) domain to form a combined DH/PH domain structure.

A distinct class of RhoGEFs is those proteins containing the DOCK/CZH/DHR-2 domain. This structure has no sequence similarity with DBL-homology domains.

== Human proteins containing DH/PH RhoGEF domain ==
ABR; AKAP13/ARHGEF13/Lbc; ALS2; ALS2CL; ARHGEF1/p115-RhoGEF; ARHGEF10; ARHGEF10L; ARHGEF11/PDZ-RhoGEF.; ARHGEF12/LARG; ARHGEF15; ARHGEF16; ARHGEF17; ARHGEF18; ARHGEF19; ARHGEF2; ARHGEF25; ARHGEF26; ARHGEF28; ARHGEF3; ARHGEF33; ARHGEF35; ARHGEF37; ARHGEF38; ARHGEF39; ARHGEF4; ARHGEF40; ARHGEF5; ARHGEF6/alpha-PIX; ARHGEF7/beta-PIX; ARHGEF9; BCR; DNMBP; ECT2; ECT2L; FARP1; FARP2; FGD1; FGD2; FGD3; FGD4; FGD5; FGD6; ITSN1/Intersectin 1; ITSN2/Intersectin 2; KALRN/Kalirin; MCF2; MCF2L; MCF2L2; NET1; NGEF; OBSCN; PLEKHG1; PLEKHG2; PLEKHG3; PLEKHG4; PLEKHG4B; PLEKHG5; PLEKHG6; PREX1; PREX2; RASGRF1; RASGRF2; SPATA13; TIAM1; TIAM2; TRIO; VAV1; VAV2; VAV3.

== Human proteins containing DOCK/CZH RhoGEF domain ==
DOCK1/DOCK180; DOCK2; DOCK3/MOCA; DOCK4; DOCK5; DOCK6/ZIR1; DOCK7/ZIR2; DOCK8/ZIR3; DOCK9/Zizimin1; DOCK10/Zizimin2; DOCK11/Zizimin3

== See also ==
- GTPase
- Small GTPase
- Guanine nucleotide exchange factor
- Rho family of GTPases
