= Dedicator of cytokinesis protein 7 =

Protein found in humans

DOCK7

Identifiers
- Aliases: DOCK7, EIEE23, ZIR2, Dock7, dedicator of cytokinesis 7, DEE23
- External IDs: OMIM: 615730; MGI: 1914549; GeneCards: DOCK7

Gene location (Human)
Chr.	Chromosome 1 (human)
Band	1p31.3	Start	62,454,298 bp
Band	1p31.3	End	62,688,386 bp

Gene location (Mouse)
Chr.	Chromosome 4 (mouse)
Band	4 C6|4 45.6 cM	Start	98,824,908 bp
Band	4 C6|4 45.6 cM	End	99,009,152 bp
RNA expression pattern
Bgee	Human / Mouse (ortholog); Top expressed in: ventricular zone; Achilles tendon; sural nerve; tibia; ganglionic eminence; retinal pigment epithelium; skin of arm; cartilage tissue; epithelium of colon; corpus callosum / Top expressed in: tail of embryo; medullary collecting duct; secondary oocyte; ganglionic eminence; genital tubercle; renal corpuscle; ventricular zone; zygote; retinal pigment epithelium; superior cervical ganglion; More reference expression data
BioGPS	n/a
Gene ontology
Molecular function	guanyl-nucleotide exchange factor activity; protein binding
Cellular component	cell projection; focal adhesion; growth cone; basal part of cell; intracellular anatomical structure; axon; neuron projection; COP9 signalosome
Biological process	cell differentiation; establishment of neuroblast polarity; axonogenesis; activation of GTPase activity; small GTPase mediated signal transduction; interkinetic nuclear migration; nervous system development; positive regulation of peptidyl-serine phosphorylation; multicellular organism development; neuron projection development; regulation of neurogenesis; microtubule cytoskeleton organization; positive regulation of vascular associated smooth muscle cell migration; negative regulation of cold-induced thermogenesis
Sources:Amigo / QuickGO
Orthologs
Databases	NCBI: entry; OMA: entry
Species	Human	Mouse
Entrez	85440	67299
Ensembl	ENSG00000116641	ENSMUSG00000028556
UniProt	Q96N67	Q8R1A4
RefSeq (mRNA)	NM_001271999; NM_001272000; NM_001272001; NM_001272002; NM_033407 NM_001330614; NM_001367561	NM_001290636; NM_026082; NM_001369285; NM_001369286
RefSeq (protein)	NP_001258928; NP_001258929; NP_001258930; NP_001258931; NP_001317543 NP_212132; NP_001354490	n/a
Location (UCSC)	Chr 1: 62.45 – 62.69 Mb	Chr 4: 98.82 – 99.01 Mb
PubMed search
- Wikidata
View/Edit Human	View/Edit Mouse

Dedicator of cytokinesis protein (Dock7) is a large (~240 kDa) protein encoded in the human by the DOCK7 gene, involved in intracellular signalling networks. It is a member of the DOCK-C subfamily of the DOCK family of guanine nucleotide exchange factors (GEFs) which function as activators of small G-proteins. Dock7 activates isoforms of the small G protein Rac.

== Discovery ==
Dock7 was identified as one of a number of proteins which share high sequence similarity with the previously described protein Dock180, the archetypal member of the DOCK family. Dock7 expression has been reported in neurons and in the HEK 293 cell line.

== Structure and function ==
Dock7 is part of a large class of proteins (GEFs) which contribute to cellular signalling events by activating small G proteins. In their resting state G proteins are bound to Guanosine diphosphate (GDP) and their activation requires the dissociation of GDP and binding of guanosine triphosphate (GTP). GEFs activate G proteins by promoting this nucleotide exchange.

Dock7 and other DOCK family proteins differ from other GEFs in that they do not possess the canonical structure of tandem DH-PH domains known to elicit nucleotide exchange. Instead they possess a DHR2 domain which mediates G protein activation by stabilising it in its nucleotide free state. They also contain a DHR1 domain which, in many DOCK family members, interacts with phospholipids. Dock7 shares the highest level of sequence similarity with Dock6 and Dock8, the other members of the DOCK-C subfamily. However, the specificity of the Dock7 DHR2 domain appears to resemble that of DOCK-A/B subfamily proteins in that it binds Rac but not Cdc42. Many DOCK family proteins contain important structural features at their N- and C-termini, however, these regions in Dock7 are poorly characterised thus far and no such features have been identified.

== Regulation of Dock7 Activity ==
Many members of the DOCK family are regulated by protein-protein interactions mediated via domains at their N- and C-termini, however, the mechanisms by which Dock7 is regulated are largely unknown. There is evidence that the production of PtdIns(3,4,5)P_{3} by members of the Phosphoinositide 3-kinase (PI3K) family is important for efficient recruitment of Dock7 since the PI3K inhibitor LY294002 was shown to block Dock7-dependent functions in neurons. This observation is consistent with the role of the DHR1 domain in other DOCK family proteins. In neurons of the hippocampus Dock7 undergoes striking changes in subcellular localisation during the progressive stages of neuronal development, resulting in an abundance of this protein in a single neurite which goes on to form the axon of the polarised neuron.

In Schwann cells (which generate an insulating layer, known as the myelin sheath, around axons of the peripheral nervous system) Dock7 appears to be activated downstream of the neuregulin receptor ErbB2, which receives signals from the axon that induce Schwann cell proliferation, migration and myelination. ErbB2 has been shown to tyrosine phosphorylate Dock7 and thus promote Schwann cell migration.

== Signalling downstream of Dock7 ==
DOCK proteins are known activators of small G proteins of the Rho family. A study of Dock7 in HEK 293 cells and hippocampal neurons has shown that it can bind and promote nucleotide exchange on the Rac subfamily isoforms Rac1 and Rac3. This work suggests that Dock7 is a key mediator of the process that specifies which of the many neurites will become the axon. Indeed, overexpression of Dock7 induced the formation of multiple axons and RNA interference knock-down of Dock7 prevented axon formation. In Schwann cells Dock7 was shown to regulate the activation of Cdc42 as well as Rac1 however no direct interaction between Dock7 and Cdc42 has been demonstrated. Dock7 has also been reported to interact with the TSC1-TSC2 (also known as hamartin-tuberin) complex, the normal function of which is disrupted in sufferers of Tuberous sclerosis. It was subsequently suggested that Dock7 may function as a GEF for Rheb, a small G protein that functions downstream of the TSC1-TSC2 complex. Although DOCK family proteins are generally considered as GEFs specific for Rho family G proteins Dock4 has been shown to bind and activate Rap1, which is not a member of the Rho family. This apparent promiscuity among DOCK proteins and their targets, coupled with the fact that Rheb is highly expressed in the brain means that Dock7 GEF activity towards Rheb, although not yet demonstrated, would not be surprising.
