= Dedicator of cytokinesis protein 4 =

Protein found in humans

DOCK4

Identifiers
- Aliases: DOCK4, Dock4, dedicator of cytokinesis 4
- External IDs: OMIM: 607679; MGI: 1918006; GeneCards: DOCK4

Gene location (Human)
| Chr. | Chromosome 7 (human) |
| Band | 7q31.1 | Start | 111,726,110 bp |
| Band | 7q31.1 | End | 112,206,407 bp |

Gene location (Mouse)
| Chr. | Chromosome 12 (mouse) |
| Band | 12 B1|12 18.06 cM | Start | 40,495,951 bp |
| Band | 12 B1|12 18.06 cM | End | 40,896,873 bp |
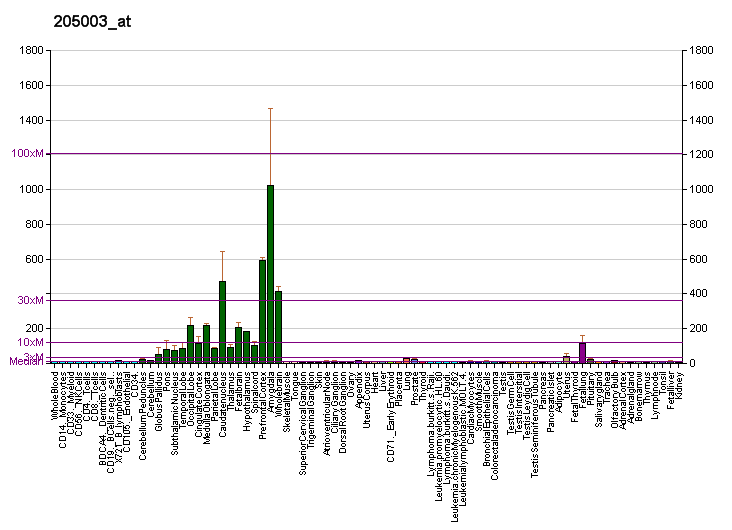
RNA expression pattern
| Bgee | Human / Mouse (ortholog); Top expressed in: endothelial cell; Region I of hippocampus proper; external globus pallidus; middle frontal gyrus; Brodmann area 23; corpus callosum; frontal pole; pars reticulata; entorhinal cortex; postcentral gyrus / Top expressed in: lateral septal nucleus; subiculum; hippocampus proper; Rostral migratory stream; subdivision of hippocampus; dentate gyrus; Region I of hippocampus proper; piriform cortex; lobe of cerebellum; anterior amygdaloid area; More reference expression data |
| BioGPS | More reference expression data |
Gene ontology
| Molecular function | SH3 domain binding; receptor tyrosine kinase binding; PDZ domain binding; protein binding; guanyl-nucleotide exchange factor activity; GTPase activator activity |
| Cellular component | stereocilium bundle; cytoplasm; cytosol; cell projection; membrane; stereocilium; nucleolus; Golgi apparatus; plasma membrane; intracellular anatomical structure |
| Biological process | small GTPase mediated signal transduction; cell chemotaxis; negative regulation of vascular associated smooth muscle contraction; positive regulation of GTPase activity; positive regulation of vascular associated smooth muscle cell migration |
Sources:Amigo / QuickGO
Orthologs
| Databases | NCBI: entry; OMA: entry |
| Species | Human | Mouse |
| Entrez | 9732 | 238130 |
| Ensembl | ENSG00000128512 | ENSMUSG00000035954 |
| UniProt | Q8N1I0 | P59764 |
| RefSeq (mRNA) | NM_014705; NM_001363540 | NM_172803 |
| RefSeq (protein) | NP_055520; NP_001350469 | NP_766391 |
| Location (UCSC) | Chr 7: 111.73 – 112.21 Mb | Chr 12: 40.5 – 40.9 Mb |
| PubMed search |
- Wikidata
| View/Edit Human | View/Edit Mouse |

Dedicator of cytokinesis protein 4 (Dock4), is a large (~190 kDa) protein encoded in the human by the DOCK4 gene, involved in intracellular signalling networks. It is a member of the DOCK-B subfamily of the DOCK family of guanine nucleotide exchange factors (GEFs) which function as activators of small G-proteins. Dock4 activates the small G proteins Rac and Rap1.

== Discovery ==
Dock4 was discovered as a gene product which was disrupted during tumour progression in a murine cancer model-derived osteosarcoma cell line. Subsequent Northern blot analysis revealed high levels of Dock4 expression in skeletal muscle, prostate and ovary as well as lower levels in the heart, placenta and colon. A separate study has reported expression of a Dock4 splice variant (Dock4-Ex49) in the brain, inner ear and eye.

== Structure and function ==
Dock4 is part of a large class of proteins (GEFs) which contribute to cellular signalling events by activating small G proteins. In their resting state G proteins are bound to Guanosine diphosphate (GDP) and their activation requires the dissociation of GDP and binding of guanosine triphosphate (GTP). GEFs activate G proteins by promoting this nucleotide exchange.

The domain arrangement of Dock4 is largely equivalent to that of Dock180 (the archetypal member of the DOCK family) and other DOCK-A/B family members (35% sequence identity with Dock180, 39% with Dock2 and 54% with Dock3). Dock4, however, contains a unique set of motifs at its proline-rich C-terminus which include a Src-binding site that is shared with CED-5, the C. elegans ortholog of mammalian DOCK proteins. Dock4 also contains a DHR2 domain (also known as Docker2 or CZH2) which is conserved among DOCK family proteins and mediates GEF-dependent functions, and a DHR1 domain (CZH1/Docker1) which has been shown to bind PtdIns(3,4,5)P_{3}, an important step in recruitment to the plasma membrane.

== Regulation of Dock4 activity ==
DOCK family proteins are inefficient at promoting nucleotide exchange on their own since they appear to adopt an autoinhibitory conformation in their resting state. The adaptor protein ELMO has been shown to bind DOCK proteins and induce a conformational change which relieves the inhibition and allows G proteins access to the DHR2 domain. Binding to ELMO requires the atypical PH domain of ELMO and also involves an interaction between the N-terminal SH3 domain of DOCK and a proline-rich motif at the ELMO C-terminus. ELMO also binds the activated form of the small G protein RhoG and this has been shown to promote DOCK-dependent signalling by helping recruit the ELMO-DOCK complex to areas of high substrate availability (usually the plasma membrane). The C-terminus of DOCK proteins interacts with another adaptor protein, Crk. Dock4 undergoes RhoG/ELMO-dependent recruitment to the plasma membrane and promotes migration in fibroblasts. In rat hippocampal neurones Dock4 forms a trimeric complex with ELMO2 and CrkII which is required for the normal development of dendrites. More recently, a role has been described for Dock4 as part of the Wnt signalling pathway which regulates cell proliferation and migration. In this system Dock4 was reported to undergo phosphorylation by Glycogen synthase kinase 3 (GSK-3) which stimulated an increase in Dock4 GEF activity.

== Signalling downstream of Dock4 ==
DOCK family proteins contribute to cell signalling by activating G proteins of the Rho family, such as Rac and Cdc42. Dock4 has also been shown to activate Rap1, a feature not reported in any of the other DOCK family proteins to date. Dock4 dependent Rac activation regulates reorganisation of the cytoskeleton and leads to the formation of membrane protrusions (e.g. lamellipodia) which are a crucial step in neuronal development and cell migration. The effect of Dock4 on the Wnt pathway appears to be mediated through Rac activation as well as through GEF-independent associations with components of the "β-catenin degradation complex".

== Dock4 in cancer ==
Mutations in Dock4 have been described in a number of cancers. The exact mechanism and extent to which it regulates cancer-associated signalling pathways is poorly understood thus far although a mutation in Dock4 which affects its GEF specificity has been reported to promote detachment and invasion of cancer cells.
