= Dedicator of cytokinesis protein 10 =

Protein found in humans

DOCK10

Identifiers
- Aliases: DOCK10, DRIP2, Nbla10300, ZIZ3, Dock10, dedicator of cytokinesis 10
- External IDs: OMIM: 611518; MGI: 2146320; GeneCards: DOCK10

Gene location (Human)
Chr.	Chromosome 2 (human)
Band	2q36.2	Start	224,765,090 bp
Band	2q36.2	End	225,042,468 bp

Gene location (Mouse)
Chr.	Chromosome 1 (mouse)
Band	1|1 C5	Start	80,478,790 bp
Band	1|1 C5	End	80,736,244 bp
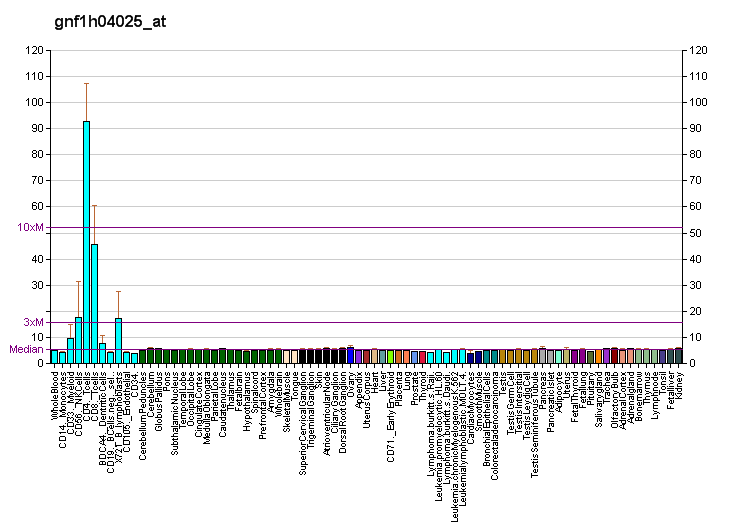

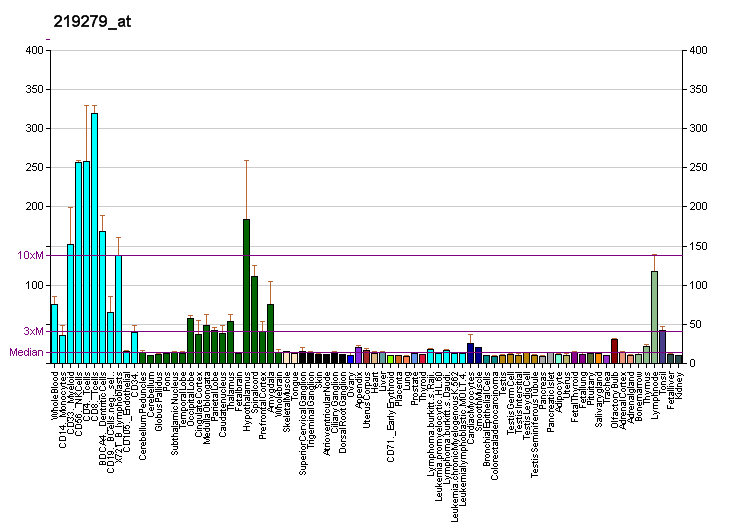

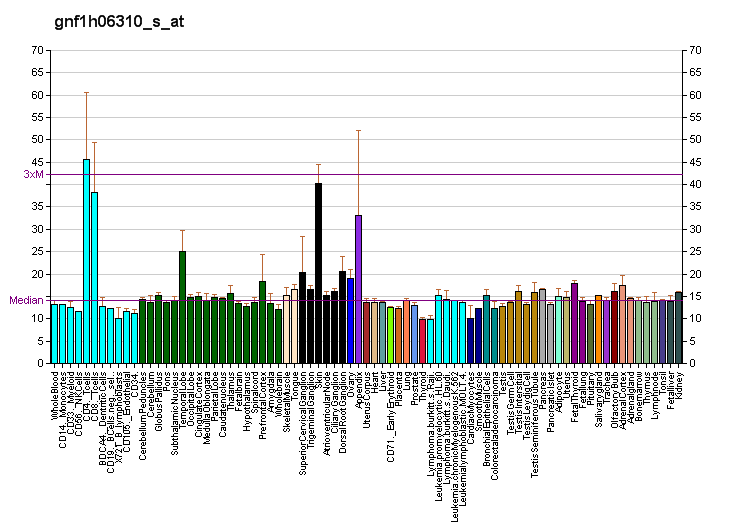
RNA expression pattern
Bgee	Human / Mouse (ortholog); Top expressed in: corpus callosum; internal globus pallidus; C1 segment; buccal mucosa cell; inferior ganglion of vagus nerve; spleen; granulocyte; substantia nigra; bone marrow cell; subthalamic nucleus / Top expressed in: mesenteric lymph nodes; otolith organ; utricle; lateral septal nucleus; spleen; globus pallidus; sciatic nerve; stroma of bone marrow; substantia nigra; suprachiasmatic nucleus; More reference expression data
BioGPS	More reference expression data
Gene ontology
Molecular function	protein binding; guanyl-nucleotide exchange factor activity; molecular function
Cellular component	extracellular exosome; membrane; nucleus; cytoplasm; cell projection; dendritic spine; nucleoplasm; cytosol; intracellular anatomical structure
Biological process	small GTPase mediated signal transduction; regulation of cell migration; B cell homeostasis; marginal zone B cell differentiation; positive regulation of GTPase activity; dendritic spine morphogenesis
Sources:Amigo / QuickGO
Orthologs
Databases	NCBI: entry; OMA: entry
Species	Human	Mouse
Entrez	55619	210293
Ensembl	ENSG00000135905	ENSMUSG00000038608
UniProt	Q96BY6	Q8BZN6
RefSeq (mRNA)	NM_001290263; NM_014689; NM_017718; NM_001363762	NM_001285927; NM_175291
RefSeq (protein)	NP_001277192; NP_055504; NP_001350691	NP_001272856; NP_780500; NP_001393483; NP_001393484
Location (UCSC)	Chr 2: 224.77 – 225.04 Mb	Chr 1: 80.48 – 80.74 Mb
PubMed search
- Wikidata
View/Edit Human	View/Edit Mouse

Dedicator of cytokinesis protein 10 (Dock10), also known as Zizimin3, is a large (~240 kDa) protein involved in intracellular signalling networks that in humans is encoded by the DOCK10 gene. It is a member of the DOCK-D subfamily of the DOCK family of guanine nucleotide exchange factors, which function as activators of small G-proteins.

== Discovery ==
Dock10 was identified via bioinformatic approaches as one of a family of evolutionarily conserved proteins (the DOCK family) that share significant sequence homology. Dock10 is expressed in peripheral blood leukocytes as well as in the brain, spleen, lung and thymus.

== Structure and function ==
Dock10 shares the same domain arrangement as other members of the DOCK-D/Zizimin subfamily as well as a high level of sequence similarity. It contains a DHR2 domain that is involved in G protein binding and a DHR1 domain, which, in some DOCK family proteins, interacts with membrane phospholipids. Like other DOCK-D subfamily proteins Dock10 contains an N-terminal PH domain, which, in Dock9/Zizimin1, mediates recruitment to the plasma membrane. The DHR2 domain of Dock10 appears to bind to the small G proteins Cdc42, TC10 and TCL although these interactions are of low affinity. The physiological role of Dock10 is poorly characterised, however a study in lymphocytes has shown that Dock10 expression is upregulated in B-lymphocytes and Chronic Lymphocytic Leukemia (CLL) cells in response to the cytokine IL-4. This suggests that Dock10 may have a role in B-cell activation and proliferation. Another study in 2006 identified Dock10 as a protein that was overexpressed in some aggressive papillary thyroid carcinomas.
