= Dedicator of cytokinesis protein 2 =

Protein found in humans

DOCK2
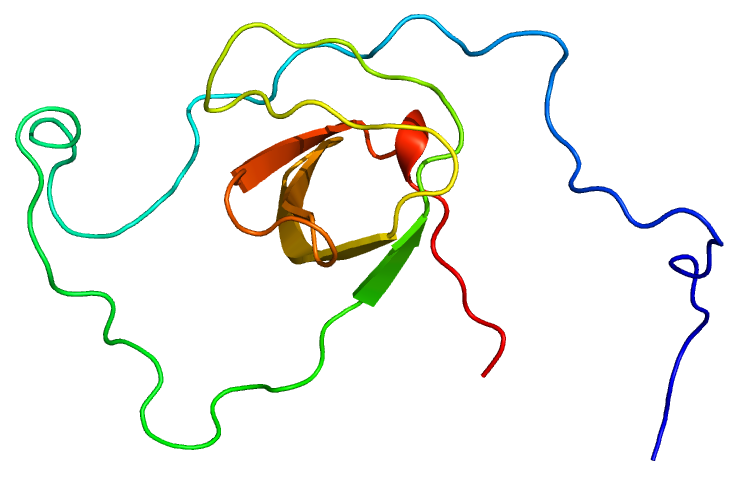

Identifiers
- Aliases: DOCK2, IMD40, Dock2, dedicator of cytokinesis 2
- External IDs: OMIM: 603122; MGI: 2149010; GeneCards: DOCK2
Available structures
PDB	Ortholog search: PDBe RCSB
PDB	List of PDB id codes 2RQR, 2YIN, 3A98, 3B13

Gene location (Human)
Chr.	Chromosome 5 (human)
Band	5q35.1	Start	169,637,268 bp
Band	5q35.1	End	170,083,382 bp

Gene location (Mouse)
Chr.	Chromosome 11 (mouse)
Band	11|11 A4	Start	34,176,815 bp
Band	11|11 A4	End	34,674,719 bp
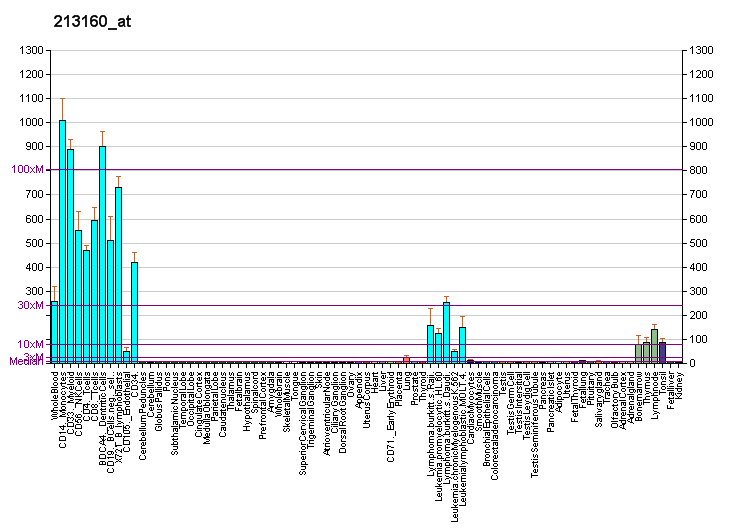
RNA expression pattern
Bgee	Human / Mouse (ortholog); Top expressed in: bone marrow cell; monocyte; granulocyte; blood; spleen; lymph node; appendix; epithelium of colon; trabecular bone; thymus / Top expressed in: granulocyte; mesenteric lymph nodes; spleen; thymus; stroma of bone marrow; blood; tibiofemoral joint; subcutaneous adipose tissue; ankle; white adipose tissue; More reference expression data
BioGPS	More reference expression data
Gene ontology
Molecular function	GTPase activator activity; guanyl-nucleotide exchange factor activity; protein binding; T cell receptor binding
Cellular component	cytoplasm; cytosol; membrane; extracellular exosome; cytoskeleton; endomembrane system; extracellular region; specific granule lumen
Biological process	positive regulation of phagocytosis; small GTPase mediated signal transduction; alpha-beta T cell activation; mitigation of host defenses by virus; membrane raft polarization; negative thymic T cell selection; T cell proliferation; chemotaxis; alpha-beta T cell proliferation; macropinocytosis; cytoskeleton organization; myeloid dendritic cell activation involved in immune response; positive thymic T cell selection; establishment of T cell polarity; immunological synapse formation; actin cytoskeleton organization; T cell activation; positive regulation of GTPase activity; neutrophil degranulation; regulation of molecular function
Sources:Amigo / QuickGO
Orthologs
Databases	NCBI: entry; OMA: entry
Species	Human	Mouse
Entrez	1794	94176
Ensembl	ENSG00000134516	ENSMUSG00000020143
UniProt	Q92608	Q8C3J5
RefSeq (mRNA)	NM_004946	NM_033374
RefSeq (protein)	NP_004937	NP_203538
Location (UCSC)	Chr 5: 169.64 – 170.08 Mb	Chr 11: 34.18 – 34.67 Mb
PubMed search
- Wikidata
View/Edit Human	View/Edit Mouse

Dedicator of cytokinesis protein 2 (Dock2) is a protein encoded in the human by the DOCK2 gene. Dock2 is a large (~180 kDa) protein involved in intracellular signalling networks. It is a member of the DOCK-A subfamily of the DOCK family of guanine nucleotide exchange factors (GEFs) which function as activators of small G-proteins. Dock2 specifically activates isoforms of the small G protein Rac.

== Discovery ==
Dock2 was first characterised as one of a number of proteins which shared high sequence similarity with the previously described protein Dock180, the archetypal member of the DOCK family. Whereas Dock180 expression is near ubiquitous in mammals, Dock2 appears to be expressed specifically in leukocytes and is considered to be the principal DOCK family member in these cells.

== Structure and function ==
Dock2 is part of a large class of proteins (GEFs) which contribute to cellular signalling events by activating small G proteins. In their resting state G proteins are bound to Guanosine diphosphate (GDP) and their activation requires the dissociation of GDP and binding of guanosine triphosphate (GTP). GEFs activate G proteins by promoting this nucleotide exchange.

Dock2 and other DOCK family proteins differ from other GEFs in that they do not possess the canonical structure of tandem DH-PH domains known to elicit nucleotide exchange. Instead they possess a DHR2 domain which mediates Rac activation by stabilising it in its nucleotide-free state. They also contain a DHR1 domain which binds phospholipids and is required for the interaction between Dock2 and the plasma membrane. As with other members of the DOCK-A and DOCK-B subfamilies, Dock2 contains an N-terminal SH3 domain which is involved in binding to ELMO proteins (see below). Dock180 contains a C-terminal proline rich region which mediates binding to Crk, however, Dock2 lacks this feature despite the fact that it is able to bind the Crk-like protein CrkL.

== Regulation of activity ==
Efficient Dock180 GEF activity in a cellular context is known to require the formation of a complex between Dock180 and its cognate adaptor proteins, which assist its translocation to the plasma membrane and binding to Rac. Similarly, Dock2 has been shown to form a complex with the well described DOCK-binding protein ELMO1 and this interaction is required for Dock2-mediated Rac activation in lymphocyte cell lines. ELMO proteins contain a C-terminal proline-rich region which binds to the N-terminal SH3 domain of DOCK proteins and mediates their recruitment to sites of high Rac availability (primarily the plasma membrane). ELMO proteins also contain a PH domain which appears to induce conformational changes in DOCK and thus allow binding to Rac.

== Signalling downstream of Dock2 ==
Like other DOCK-A and DOCK-B subfamily proteins Dock2 GEF activity is specific for Rac. Leukocytes express both Rac1 and Rac2 and Dock2 has been shown to bind and promote nucleotide exchange on both of these isoforms. Rac isoforms regulate a multitude of processes in leukocytes and studies so far have shown that Dock2-dependent Rac activation regulates the neutrophil NADPH oxidase and is also important for chemotaxis in neutrophils, lymphocytes and plasmacytoid dendritic cells. Dock2-dependent NADPH oxidase activation was reported in response to the soluble agonist fMLP, which acts via G protein-coupled receptors in neutrophils. Dock2-dependent chemotaxis has been reported in response to the chemokines CXCL12/SDF-1 in T lymphocytes, CXCL13/BLC in B lymphocytes and CCL19/ELC in thymocytes (immature lymphocytes) emigrating from the thymus as well as CCL21/SLC in ex vivo plasmacytoid dendritic cells. In neutrophil chemotaxis Dock2 signals downstream of the C5a and CXCL8/IL-8 receptors. Additional receptors which signal through Dock2 include the T cell receptor/TCR and EDG1, a sphingosine-1-phosphate (S1P) receptor. The HIV-1 protein Nef is able to constitutively activate Dock2 in T lymphocytes which disrupts chemotaxis and immunological synapse formation thereby inhibiting the antiviral immune response.

== Interactions ==
Dock2 has been shown to interact with CRKL.
