= Dedicator of cytokinesis protein 11 =

Protein-coding gene in humans

DOCK11

Identifiers
- Aliases: DOCK11, ACG, ZIZ2, bB128O4.1, Dock11, dedicator of cytokinesis 11
- External IDs: OMIM: 300681; MGI: 1923224; GeneCards: DOCK11

Gene location (Human)
Chr.	X chromosome (human)
Band	Xq24	Start	118,495,815 bp
Band	Xq24	End	118,686,163 bp

Gene location (Mouse)
Chr.	X chromosome (mouse)
Band	X|X A3.3	Start	35,152,485 bp
Band	X|X A3.3	End	35,340,215 bp
RNA expression pattern
Bgee	Human / Mouse (ortholog); Top expressed in: parietal pleura; germinal epithelium; Achilles tendon; visceral pleura; subcutaneous adipose tissue; synovial membrane; granulocyte; blood; synovial joint; abdominal fat / Top expressed in: hand; primitive streak; umbilical cord; lymph node; trigeminal ganglion; mesenteric lymph nodes; blood; spinal ganglia; conjunctival fornix; subcutaneous adipose tissue; More reference expression data
BioGPS	n/a
Gene ontology
Molecular function	protein binding; guanyl-nucleotide exchange factor activity
Cellular component	cytosol
Biological process	small GTPase mediated signal transduction; blood coagulation; B cell homeostasis; marginal zone B cell differentiation; positive regulation of GTPase activity; positive regulation of filopodium assembly
Sources:Amigo / QuickGO
Orthologs
Databases	NCBI: entry; OMA: entry
Species	Human	Mouse
Entrez	139818	75974
Ensembl	ENSG00000147251	ENSMUSG00000031093
UniProt	Q5JSL3	A2AF47
RefSeq (mRNA)	NM_144658	NM_001009947; NM_177745
RefSeq (protein)	NP_653259	NP_001009947
Location (UCSC)	Chr X: 118.5 – 118.69 Mb	Chr X: 35.15 – 35.34 Mb
PubMed search
- Wikidata
View/Edit Human	View/Edit Mouse

Dedicator of cytokinesis protein 11 (Dock11), also known as Zizimin2, is a large (~240 kDa) protein encoded in the human by the DOCK11 gene, involved in intracellular signalling networks. It is a member of the DOCK-D subfamily of the DOCK family of guanine nucleotide exchange factors (GEFs) which function as activators of small G-proteins. Dock11 activates the small G protein Cdc42.

== Discovery ==
Dock11 was identified as a protein which is highly expressed in germinal center B lymphocytes. Subsequent RT-PCR analysis revealed expression of this protein in the spleen, thymus, bone marrow and in peripheral blood lymphocytes. Dock11 is expressed at lower levels in NIH-3T3 fibroblasts, C2C12 myoblasts and Neuro-2A neuroblastoma cells. Dock11 mRNA has also been detected in the pars intermedia.

== Structure and function ==
Dock11 exhibits the same domain arrangement as other members of the DOCK-D/Zizimin subfamily and shares the highest level of sequence identity with Dock9. It contains a DHR2 domain which mediates GEF activity and a DHR1 domain which may interact with membrane phospholipids. It also contains an N-terminal PH domain which may be involved in its recruitment to the plasma membrane. Dock11 binds and activates nucleotide-free Cdc42 via its DHR2 domain and has also been reported to mediate positive feedback on active, GTP-bound Cdc42, although this interaction required a small N-terminal region of Dock11 in addition to the DHR2 domain. Cdc42 in turn regulates signaling pathways that control diverse cellular functions including morphology, migration, endocytosis and cell cycle progression. Gene expression studies have suggested that Dock11 may have a role in the development of pituitary and testicular tumours.

== Deficiency in humans ==
Hemizygous DOCK11 mutations in humans are associated with early-onset and severe autoimmunity. In eight male patients, from seven unrelated pedigrees, with hemizygous DOCK11 missense variants, a reduction in DOCK11 expression was observed. The patients presented with early-onset autoimmunity, including cytopenia, systemic lupus erythematosus, skin, and digestive manifestations. Platelets and lymphocytes exhibited abnormal ultrastructural morphology and spreading as well as impaired CDC42 activity. The patients' cells exhibited aberrant protrusions and abnormal migration speed in confined channels concomitant with altered actin polymerization during migration. A DOCK11 knock-down in monocytes-derived dendritic cells (MDDC) and in T cells from healthy controls, recapitulated these abnormal cellular phenotypes. Abnormal regulatory T cells (Tregs) phenotype with profoundly reduced FOXP3 and IKZF2 expression was also observed, consistent with the autoimmune features developed by the DOCK11-deficient patients. Moreover, the authors observed a reduced T cell proliferation and an impaired STAT5B phosphorylation upon IL2 stimulation of the patients' lymphocytes. DOCK11 deficiency is therefore a new X-linked immune-related actinopathy leading to abnormal actin cytoskeleton remodeling, impaired CDC42 activity and STAT5 activation, and associated with early-onset autoimmunity.
