= MCF2 =

Protein-coding gene in the humans

Identifiers
- Aliases: MCF2, ARHGEF21, DBL, MCF.2 cell line derived transforming sequence
- External IDs: OMIM: 311030; MGI: 96932; GeneCards: MCF2

Gene location (Mouse)
Chr.	X chromosome (mouse)
Band	X A6|X 33.5 cM	Start	59,101,316 bp
Band	X A6|X 33.5 cM	End	59,224,449 bp
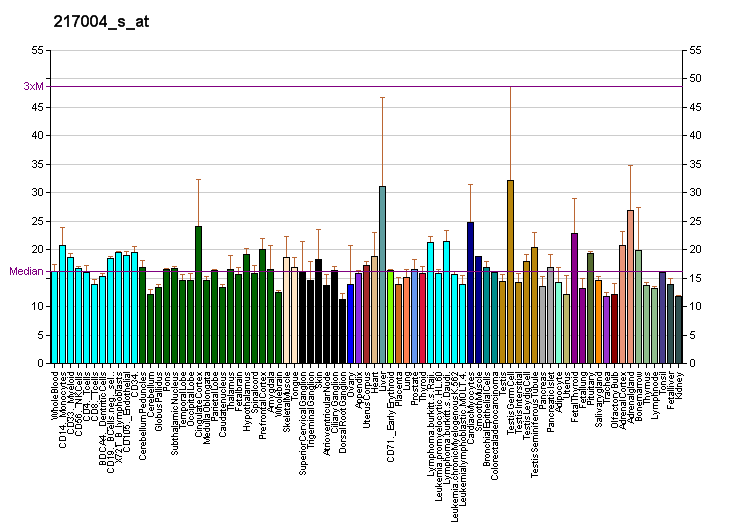

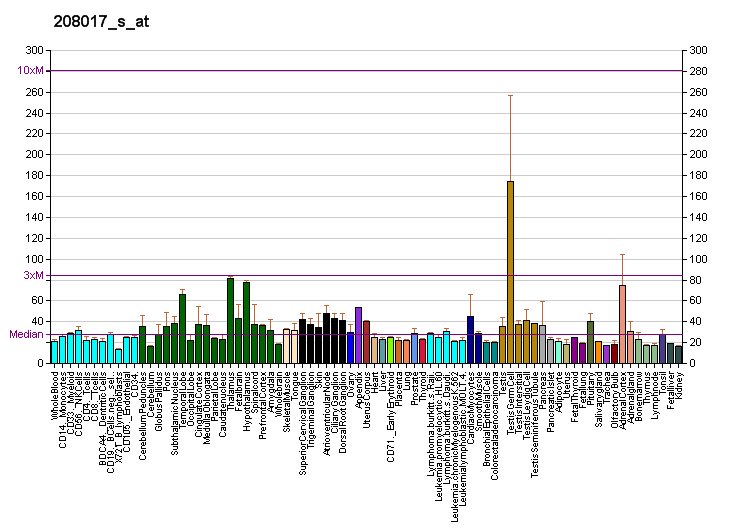
RNA expression pattern
Bgee	Human / Mouse (ortholog); Top expressed in: seminal vesicula; endothelial cell; Brodmann area 23; hypothalamus; Brodmann area 9; prefrontal cortex; substantia nigra; pons; middle temporal gyrus; nucleus accumbens / Top expressed in: lumbar subsegment of spinal cord; facial motor nucleus; anterior horn of spinal cord; epiblast; embryo; zygote; spermatocyte; embryo; substantia nigra; lateral geniculate nucleus; More reference expression data
BioGPS	More reference expression data
Gene ontology
Molecular function	protein binding; guanyl-nucleotide exchange factor activity
Cellular component	cytoplasm; cytosol; cytoskeleton; membrane
Biological process	regulation of Rho protein signal transduction; intracellular signal transduction; regulation of small GTPase mediated signal transduction; positive regulation of apoptotic process; G protein-coupled receptor signaling pathway; negative regulation of axonogenesis; dendrite development; cellular response to leukemia inhibitory factor
Sources:Amigo / QuickGO
Orthologs
Databases	NCBI: entry
Species	Human	Mouse
Entrez	4168	109904
Ensembl	n/a	ENSMUSG00000031139
UniProt	P10911	n/a
RefSeq (mRNA)	NM_001099855; NM_001171876; NM_001171877; NM_001171878; NM_001171879 NM_005369	NM_001289730; NM_001289731; NM_133197; NM_001358998; NM_001358999 NM_001359000; NM_001359001
RefSeq (protein)	NP_001093325; NP_001165347; NP_001165348; NP_001165349; NP_001165350 NP_005360	n/a
Location (UCSC)	n/a	Chr X: 59.1 – 59.22 Mb
PubMed search
- Wikidata
View/Edit Human	View/Edit Mouse

Proto-oncogene DBL is a protein that in humans is encoded by the MCF2 gene.

The commonly used name DBL is derived from “diffuse B-cell lymphoma”, the cancer type where this gene was first identified as an oncogene, while the name MCF2 name derives from “MCF.2 cell line-derived transforming sequence”.

DBL is the founding member of a large family of guanine nucleotide exchange factors that share a common DBL-homology (DH) domain), so DBL is also named as a member of this RhoGEF family as ARHGEF21. DH domains function to activate small GTPases of the Rho family by facilitating release of GDP from an inactive Rho GTPase and binding of GTP to activate it. In particular, DBL activates the Rho family member Cdc42.

Gene recombinations that result in the loss of N-terminal regions produce MCF2 variants with oncogenic activity.[supplied by OMIM]
