= Dedicator of cytokinesis protein 8 =

Protein found in humans

DOCK8

Identifiers
- Aliases: DOCK8, HEL-205, MRD2, ZIR8, Dock8, dedicator of cytokinesis 8
- External IDs: OMIM: 611432; MGI: 1921396; GeneCards: DOCK8
Available structures
PDB	Ortholog search: PDBe RCSB
PDB	List of PDB id codes 3VHL

Gene location (Human)
Chr.	Chromosome 9 (human)
Band	9p24.3	Start	214,854 bp
Band	9p24.3	End	465,259 bp

Gene location (Mouse)
Chr.	Chromosome 19 (mouse)
Band	19|19 B	Start	24,976,898 bp
Band	19|19 B	End	25,179,796 bp
RNA expression pattern
Bgee	Human / Mouse (ortholog); Top expressed in: bone marrow cell; white blood cell; monocyte; thymus; blood; spleen; granulocyte; lymph node; appendix; pancreatic ductal cell / Top expressed in: granulocyte; thymus; spleen; tibiofemoral joint; mesenteric lymph nodes; transitional epithelium of urinary bladder; bone marrow; blood; olfactory epithelium; subcutaneous adipose tissue; More reference expression data
BioGPS	n/a
Gene ontology
Molecular function	protein binding; guanyl-nucleotide exchange factor activity
Cellular component	cytosol; cell leading edge; leading edge membrane; cytoplasm; plasma membrane; membrane; lamellipodium membrane; cell projection; intracellular anatomical structure
Biological process	negative regulation of T cell apoptotic process; small GTPase mediated signal transduction; immunological synapse formation; blood coagulation; memory T cell proliferation; dendritic cell migration; positive regulation of GTPase activity; positive regulation of establishment of T cell polarity; cellular response to chemokine; positive regulation of T cell migration
Sources:Amigo / QuickGO
Orthologs
Databases	NCBI: entry; OMA: entry
Species	Human	Mouse
Entrez	81704	76088
Ensembl	ENSG00000107099	ENSMUSG00000052085
UniProt	Q8NF50	Q8C147
RefSeq (mRNA)	NM_001190458; NM_001193536; NM_203447	NM_028785; NM_175233
RefSeq (protein)	NP_001177387; NP_001180465; NP_982272; NP_001180465.1	NP_083061
Location (UCSC)	Chr 9: 0.21 – 0.47 Mb	Chr 19: 24.98 – 25.18 Mb
PubMed search
- Wikidata
View/Edit Human	View/Edit Mouse

Dedicator of cytokinesis protein 8 (Dock8) is a large (~190 kDa) protein encoded in the human by the DOCK8 gene, involved in intracellular signalling networks. It is a member of the DOCK-C subfamily of the DOCK family of guanine nucleotide exchange factors (GEFs) which function as activators of small G-proteins.

== Discovery ==
Dock8 was identified during a yeast two hybrid (YTH) screen for proteins that interact with the Rho family small G protein Cdc42. Subsequent northern blot analysis revealed high levels of Dock8 expression in the placenta, lung, kidney and pancreas as well as lower levels in the heart, brain and skeletal muscle.

== Function ==
Dock8 shares the same core domain arrangement as all other DOCK proteins, with a DHR2 domain which, in other proteins, contains GEF activity and a DHR1 domain known, in other proteins, to interact with phospholipids. In the YTH system Dock8 was reported to interact with both Rac1 and Cdc42. However, no stable interaction between Dock8 and these small G proteins was observed in a GST-pulldown assay. This may be due to the fact many DOCK-G protein interactions require the presence of adaptor proteins to stabilise the complex and thus facilitate nucleotide exchange.

== Clinical significance ==
A mutation in the DOCK8 gene is associated with the autosomal recessive form of Job's syndrome or hyper-IgE Syndrome. It is manifested in infancy and the patient survives till late childhood or adolescence. The disease is characterized by eczema, recurrent cold staphylococcal abscesses, recurrent lung infections, coarse facial features, primary teeth remnants (2 rows of teeth present), high IgE levels and eosinophilia.

== Somatic mutations ==
Despite the fact that little is known about the cellular role of Dock8 its importance has been highlighted in several studies which have identified disruption of the DOCK8 gene in disease. Deletion and reduced expression of Dock8 have been reported in a human lung cancer cell line and Dock8 was also identified as a putative candidate gene associated with progression of gliomas.

== Clinical significance of germline mutations ==
Autosomal recessive DOCK8 deficiency is associated with a variant of combined immunodeficiency. This variant of Hyperimmunoglobulin E syndrome (HIES) was first described in 2004 and this clinical entity is known to be due to having biallelic germline mutations in the DOCK8 gene. HIES due to DOCK8-deficiency has a distinct clinical presentation compared to other forms of HIES and in inherited in an autosomal recessive manner.

The clinical manifestations of DOCK8 immunodefiency include recurrent infections, allergies, and malignancies. Nearly all patients have recurrent or chronic upper and lower respiratory tract infections, with many requiring sinus surgery and myringotomy tube placement. Recurrent lung infections may lead to bronchiectasis or damage to the airways leaving them widened and scarred. The cutaneous or skin infections are distinctive and include severe and difficult to treat viral infections, such as herpes simplex virus, human papilloma virus, and molluscum contagiosum; bacteria such as Staphylococcus aureus; as well as fungal infections of the mouth or skin with Candida. Eczema is common, and can be quite severe and further complicated by bacterial infection. Together, these skin infections can become disfiguring.

DOCK8 immunodefiency patients frequently have allergies to many food and environmental allergens, as well as asthma. Autoimmunity has been seen in some patients, such as autoimmune hemolytic anemia, as well as vasculitis and vasculopathy. Patients are also at increased risk for developing squamous cell carcinomas and lymphoid malignancies. Some but not all lymphomas are associated with poor control of the cancer-causing virus, Epstein–Barr. These cancer risks are significant and patients should be monitored closely for signs of malignancy.

This disorder is considered a combined immunodeficiency because it includes both decreased lymphocyte numbers and defective lymphocyte function. It can also be classified as a type of autosomal recessive hyperimmunoglobulinemia E syndrome. Laboratory manifestations include progressive lymphopenia that primarily affects CD4 and CD8 T cell subsets, reduced B cell and/or NK cell counts in some patients, eosinophilia, and immunoglobulin abnormalities. Antibody responses to vaccines are frequently poor. Loss of Dock8 protein expression can be demonstrated by diagnostic intracellular flow cytometry testing.

Once a diagnosis is made, treatment is based on an individual's clinical condition and may include medication and other strategies for managing infections, allergies, and asthma. Supportive care includes prophylactic antimicrobials, and consideration of immune globulin replacement. Interferon alpha has been used for control of serious viral infections, such as widespread warts or herpes simplex virus. Hematopoietic stem cell transplant is curative in many primary immunodeficiencies and has successfully been used for patients with DOCK8 immunodefiency.
