= SGEF =

ARHGEF26

Identifiers
- Aliases: ARHGEF26, CSGEF, HMFN1864, SGEF, Rho guanine nucleotide exchange factor 26
- External IDs: OMIM: 617552; MGI: 1918053; GeneCards: ARHGEF26

Gene location (Human)
Chr.	Chromosome 3 (human)
Band	3q25.2	Start	154,121,003 bp
Band	3q25.2	End	154,257,827 bp

Gene location (Mouse)
Chr.	Chromosome 3 (mouse)
Band	3|3 E1	Start	62,245,765 bp
Band	3|3 E1	End	62,369,642 bp
RNA expression pattern
Bgee	Human / Mouse (ortholog); Top expressed in: tibial nerve; muscle layer of sigmoid colon; testicle; sural nerve; right lung; Descending thoracic aorta; right lobe of liver; upper lobe of left lung; gonad; ascending aorta / Top expressed in: otolith organ; utricle; neural layer of retina; right lung; vestibular sensory epithelium; subdivision of hippocampus; Region I of hippocampus proper; deep cerebellar nuclei; right lung lobe; retinal pigment epithelium; More reference expression data
BioGPS	n/a
Gene ontology
Molecular function	guanyl-nucleotide exchange factor activity
Cellular component	cell projection; ruffle; cytosol
Biological process	ruffle assembly; regulation of Rho protein signal transduction; endothelial cell morphogenesis; positive regulation of apoptotic process; regulation of small GTPase mediated signal transduction; G protein-coupled receptor signaling pathway
Sources:Amigo / QuickGO
Orthologs
Databases	NCBI: entry; OMA: entry
Species	Human	Mouse
Entrez	26084	622434
Ensembl	ENSG00000114790; ENSG00000277101	ENSMUSG00000036885
UniProt	Q96DR7	n/a
RefSeq (mRNA)	NM_001251962; NM_001251963; NM_015595	NM_001081295
RefSeq (protein)	NP_001238891; NP_001238892; NP_056410	n/a
Location (UCSC)	Chr 3: 154.12 – 154.26 Mb	Chr 3: 62.25 – 62.37 Mb
PubMed search
- Wikidata
View/Edit Human	View/Edit Mouse

SGEF (Src homology 3 domain-containing Guanine nucleotide Exchange Factor) is a protein that in humans is encoded by ARHGEF26 gene. SGEF is a 97 kDa protein involved in intracellular signalling networks. It functions as a guanine nucleotide exchange factor (GEF) for RhoG, a small G protein of the Rho family.

== Discovery ==
SGEF was discovered during a screen for androgen-responsive genes in human prostate cancer cells. Subsequent northern blot analysis revealed expression of SGEF in tissues of the heart, brain, placenta, lung, liver, kidney, pancreas, prostate, testis, small intestine and colon. SGEF is also expressed in endothelial cells of the vasculature. Several widely used cell lines express this protein, these include A431, HeLa, HUT78, HEK-293, Jurkat, THP, PC12, RAJI, U937 and Meg-01. SGEF was identified to contribute to the formation of atherosclerosis through promoting endothelial docking structures that resulted in retention of leukocytes at athero-prone sites of inflammation. Genetic variants in SGEF have been associated with coronary artery disease

== Structure and function ==
SGEF is part of a large class of proteins (GEFs) that function to activate small G proteins. In their resting state G proteins are bound to guanosine diphosphate (GDP) and their activation requires the dissociation of GDP and binding of guanosine triphosphate (GTP). GEFs activate G proteins by promoting nucleotide exchange.

SGEF has the canonical GEF structure of tandem DH and PH domains, which elicit nucleotide exchange and, in addition, contains an N-terminal proline-rich motif and a C-terminal SH3 domain. Proline regions and SH3 domains often mediate recruitment and binding to adaptor proteins suggesting that SGEF is probably involved in the formation of heteromultimeric protein complexes.

== Regulation of activity ==
Data from several studies suggest that SGEF is regulated by its recruitment to transmembrane receptor-linked adaptor proteins via its SH3 domain. In one study, mutation of the SH3 domain disrupted SGEF-dependent functions in NIH-3T3 fibroblasts. In endothelial cells SGEF was recruited to the intracellular domain of the transmembrane adhesion molecule ICAM-1 upon leukocyte adhesion to the endothelium.
