= Dedicator of cytokinesis protein 6 =

Protein found in humans

DOCK6

Identifiers
- Aliases: DOCK6, AOS2, ZIR1, Dock6, dedicator of cytokinesis 6
- External IDs: OMIM: 614194; MGI: 1914789; GeneCards: DOCK6

Gene location (Human)
Chr.	Chromosome 19 (human)
Band	19p13.2	Start	11,199,295 bp
Band	19p13.2	End	11,262,524 bp

Gene location (Mouse)
Chr.	Chromosome 9 (mouse)
Band	9|9 A3	Start	21,711,156 bp
Band	9|9 A3	End	21,763,931 bp
RNA expression pattern
Bgee	Human / Mouse (ortholog); Top expressed in: epithelium of colon; right lung; apex of heart; upper lobe of left lung; left lobe of thyroid gland; right lobe of thyroid gland; skin of leg; skin of abdomen; subcutaneous adipose tissue; gastric mucosa / Top expressed in: interventricular septum; tail of embryo; lip; ascending aorta; left lung; semi-lunar valve; aortic valve; left lung lobe; internal carotid artery; muscle of thigh; More reference expression data
BioGPS	n/a
Gene ontology
Molecular function	guanyl-nucleotide exchange factor activity
Cellular component	perinuclear region of cytoplasm; cytoplasm; cytosol
Biological process	small GTPase mediated signal transduction; blood coagulation
Sources:Amigo / QuickGO
Orthologs
Databases	NCBI: entry; OMA: entry
Species	Human	Mouse
Entrez	57572	319899
Ensembl	ENSG00000130158	ENSMUSG00000032198
UniProt	Q96HP0	Q8VDR9
RefSeq (mRNA)	NM_020812; NM_001367830	NM_177030
RefSeq (protein)	NP_065863; NP_001354759	NP_796004
Location (UCSC)	Chr 19: 11.2 – 11.26 Mb	Chr 9: 21.71 – 21.76 Mb
PubMed search
- Wikidata
View/Edit Human	View/Edit Mouse

Dedicator of cytokinesis protein 6 (Dock6), also known as Zir1, is a large (~200 kDa) protein encoded in the human by the DOCK6 gene, involved in intracellular signalling networks. It is a member of the DOCK-C subfamily of the DOCK family of guanine nucleotide exchange factors which function as activators of small G-proteins.

== Discovery ==
Dock6 was identified as one of a family of proteins which share high sequence similarity with Dock180, the archetypal member of the DOCK family. It has a similar domain arrangement to other DOCK proteins, with a DHR1 domain known in other proteins to bind phospholipids, and a DHR2 domain containing the GEF activity.

== Function ==
There is currently very little information about the cellular role of this protein. However, Dock6 has been reported to exhibit dual GEF specificity towards the small G proteins Rac1 and Cdc42. It is the only DOCK family member reported to activate both of these G proteins. The same study also showed that transfection of the Dock6 DHR2 domain into N1E-115 neuroblastoma cells promoted Rac- and Cdc42-dependent neurite outgrowth, although the physiological significance of this has yet to be demonstrated.
