= DOCK (protein) =

Dedicator of cytokinesis

Identifiers
- Symbol: Ded_cyto
- Pfam: PF06920
- InterPro: IPR026791
- SCOP2: 1wg7 / SCOPe / SUPFAM
- CDD: cd11684
Available protein structures:
- PDB: 1wg7 IPR026791 PF06920 (ECOD; PDBsum)
- AlphaFold: IPR026791; PF06920

Dedicator of cytokinesis, (DOCK) is a family of related proteins involved in intracellular signalling networks. DOCK family members contain a RhoGEF domain to function as guanine nucleotide exchange factors to promote GDP release and GTP binding to specific Small GTPases of the Rho family (e.g., Rac and Cdc42), leading to their activation since Rho proteins are inactive when bound to GDP but active when bound to GTP.

== Subfamilies ==
DOCK family proteins are categorised into four subfamilies based on their sequence homology:

- DOCK-A subfamily
  - Dock180 (also known as Dock1)
  - Dock2
  - Dock5
- DOCK-B subfamily
  - Dock3 (also known as MOCA and PBP)
  - Dock4
- DOCK-C subfamily (also known as Zir subfamily)
  - Dock6 (also known as Zir1)
  - Dock7 (also known as Zir2)
  - Dock8 (also known as Zir3)
- DOCK-D subfamily (also known as Zizimin subfamily)
  - Dock9 (also known as Zizimin1)
  - Dock10 (also known as Zizimin3)
  - Dock11 (also known as Zizimin2)
