= Dedicator of cytokinesis protein 9 =

Protein found in humans

DOCK9
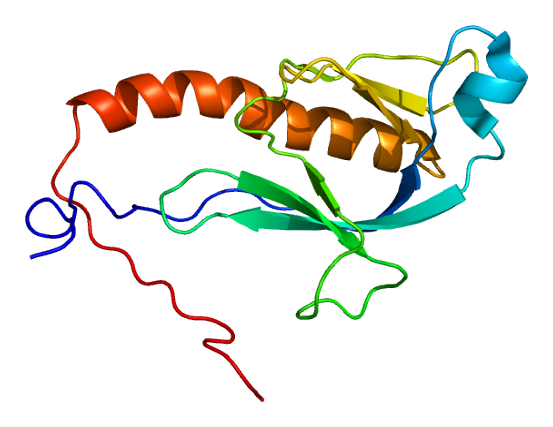

Identifiers
- Aliases: DOCK9, ZIZ1, ZIZIMIN1, Dock9, dedicator of cytokinesis 9
- External IDs: OMIM: 607325; MGI: 106321; GeneCards: DOCK9
Available structures
PDB	Ortholog search: PDBe RCSB
PDB	List of PDB id codes 1WG7, 2WM9, 2WMN, 2WMO

Gene location (Human)
Chr.	Chromosome 13 (human)
Band	13q32.3	Start	98,793,429 bp
Band	13q32.3	End	99,086,625 bp

Gene location (Mouse)
Chr.	Chromosome 14 (mouse)
Band	14 E5|14 65.28 cM	Start	121,779,458 bp
Band	14 E5|14 65.28 cM	End	122,035,249 bp
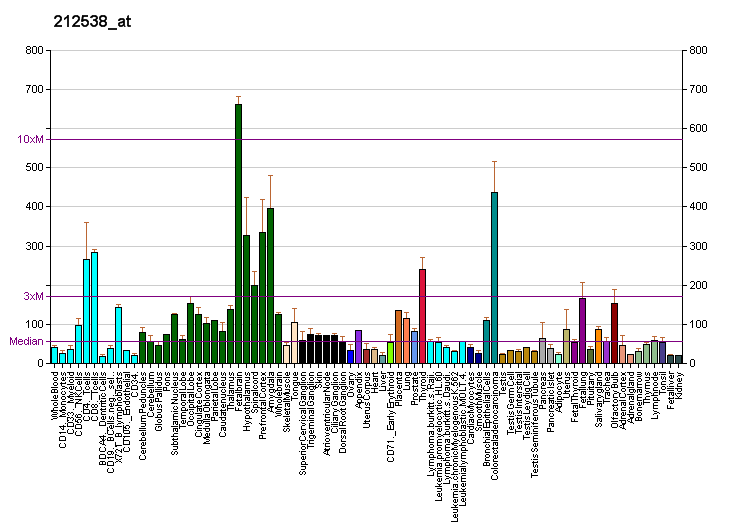

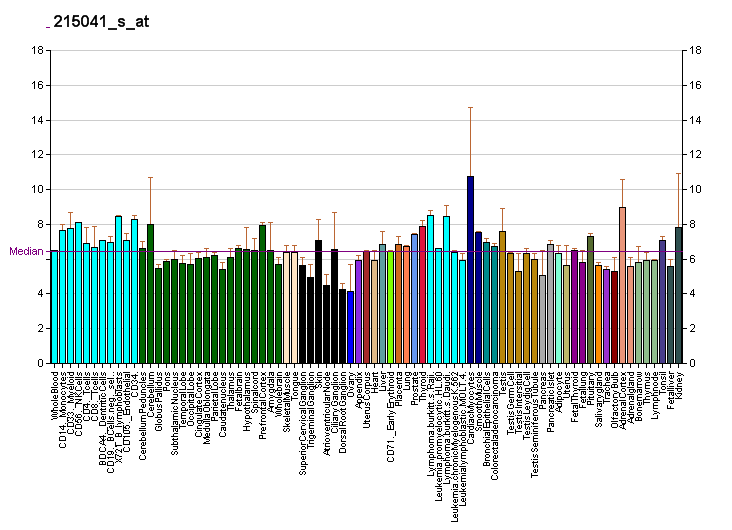

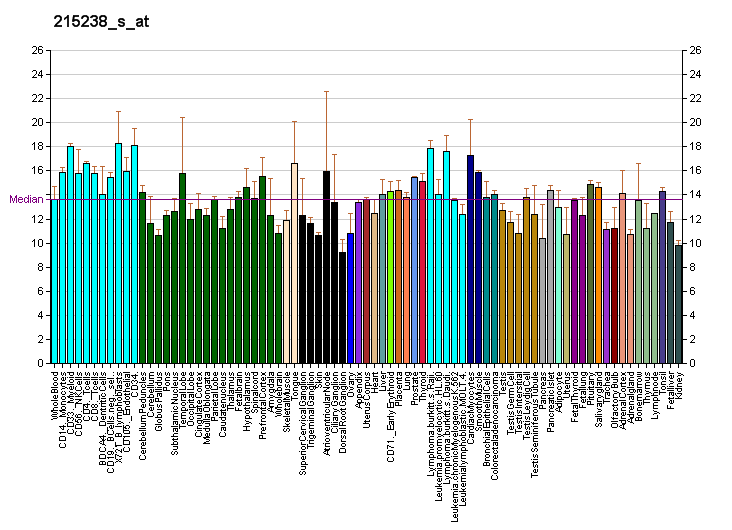
RNA expression pattern
Bgee	Human / Mouse (ortholog); Top expressed in: Achilles tendon; right lung; corpus callosum; Region I of hippocampus proper; lower lobe of lung; oral cavity; sural nerve; skin of hip; inferior olivary nucleus; upper lobe of lung / Top expressed in: subiculum; right lung lobe; sciatic nerve; CA3 field; cerebellar vermis; Region I of hippocampus proper; lobe of cerebellum; tunica adventitia of aorta; deep cerebellar nuclei; endothelial cell of lymphatic vessel; More reference expression data
BioGPS	More reference expression data
Gene ontology
Molecular function	protein binding; guanyl-nucleotide exchange factor activity; cadherin binding
Cellular component	cytosol; endomembrane system; membrane
Biological process	blood coagulation; small GTPase mediated signal transduction; positive regulation of GTPase activity; biological process
Sources:Amigo / QuickGO
Orthologs
Databases	NCBI: entry; OMA: entry
Species	Human	Mouse
Entrez	23348	105445
Ensembl	ENSG00000088387	ENSMUSG00000025558
UniProt	Q9BZ29	Q8BIK4
RefSeq (mRNA)	NM_001130048; NM_001130049; NM_001130050; NM_015296; NM_001318849 NM_001366676; NM_001366677; NM_001366678; NM_001366679; NM_001366680; NM_001366681; NM_001366682; NM_001366683; NM_001366684	NM_001081039; NM_001128307; NM_001128308; NM_134074; NM_001347596
RefSeq (protein)	NP_001123520; NP_001123521; NP_001123522; NP_001305778; NP_056111 NP_001353605; NP_001353606; NP_001353607; NP_001353608; NP_001353609; NP_001353610; NP_001353611; NP_001353612; NP_001353613	n/a
Location (UCSC)	Chr 13: 98.79 – 99.09 Mb	Chr 14: 121.78 – 122.04 Mb
PubMed search
- Wikidata
View/Edit Human	View/Edit Mouse

Dedicator of cytokinesis protein 9 (Dock9), also known as Zizimin1, is a large (~230 kDa) protein encoded in the human by the DOCK9 gene, involved in intracellular signalling networks. It is a member of the DOCK-D subfamily of the DOCK family of guanine nucleotide exchange factors that function as activators of small G-proteins. Dock9 activates the small G protein Cdc42.

== Discovery ==
Dock9 was discovered using an affinity proteomic approach designed to identify novel activators of the small G protein Cdc42 in fibroblasts. Subsequent northern blot analysis revealed that Dock9 is expressed primarily in the brain, heart, skeletal muscle, kidney, placenta and lung. Lower levels were detected in the colon, thymus, liver, small intestine and in leukocytes from peripheral blood.

== Structure and function ==
Dock9 shares a similar structure of two core domains (known as DHR1 and DHR2), which are shared by all DOCK family members. The C-terminal DHR2 domain functions as an atypical GEF domain for small G proteins (see Dock180: structure and function) and the DHR1 domain is known, in some DOCK-A/B/C subfamily proteins, to be involved in their recruitment to the plasma membrane. Unlike DOCK-A/B/C proteins DOCK-D proteins (including Dock9) contain an N-terminal pleckstrin homology (PH) domain that mediates their recruitment to the membrane. Dock9, along with other DOCK-C/D subfamily members, can activate Cdc42 in vitro and in vivo via its DHR2 domain. However, Dock9 adopts an autoinhibitory conformation that masks the DHR2 domain in its resting state. The mechanism by which this autoinhibition is overcome is still unclear although in some other DOCK proteins, which also undergo autoinhibition, it requires an interaction with adaptor proteins such as ELMO. Dock9 has also been reported to dimerise, under resting conditions, via its DHR2 domains and this study suggests that other DOCK family proteins may also behave in the same way. Recent analysis of a chromosomal region associated with susceptibility to bipolar disorder revealed that single nucleotide polymorphisms in the DOCK9 gene contribute to the risk and severity of this condition.
