= Dedicator of cytokinesis protein 3 =

Protein found in humans

DOCK3

Identifiers
- Aliases: DOCK3, MOCA, PBP, Dock3, dedicator of cytokinesis 3, NEDIDHA
- External IDs: OMIM: 603123; MGI: 2429763; GeneCards: DOCK3

Gene location (Human)
| Chr. | Chromosome 3 (human) |
| Band | 3p21.2 | Start | 50,674,927 bp |
| Band | 3p21.2 | End | 51,384,198 bp |

Gene location (Mouse)
| Chr. | Chromosome 9 (mouse) |
| Band | 9|9 F1 | Start | 106,770,024 bp |
| Band | 9|9 F1 | End | 107,109,108 bp |
RNA expression pattern
| Bgee | Human / Mouse (ortholog); Top expressed in: frontal pole; Brodmann area 10; paraflocculus of cerebellum; middle frontal gyrus; postcentral gyrus; Brodmann area 46; orbitofrontal cortex; superior frontal gyrus; cerebellar vermis; dorsolateral prefrontal cortex / Top expressed in: dentate gyrus of hippocampal formation granule cell; superior frontal gyrus; primary visual cortex; piriform cortex; primary motor cortex; olfactory tubercle; zygote; prefrontal cortex; cerebellar cortex; temporal lobe; More reference expression data |
| BioGPS | n/a |
Gene ontology
| Molecular function | SH3 domain binding; protein binding; guanyl-nucleotide exchange factor activity |
| Cellular component | cytoplasm; cytosol |
| Biological process | small GTPase mediated signal transduction; positive regulation of non-membrane spanning protein tyrosine kinase activity |
Sources:Amigo / QuickGO
Orthologs
| Databases | NCBI: entry; OMA: entry |
| Species | Human | Mouse |
| Entrez | 1795 | 208869 |
| Ensembl | ENSG00000088538 | ENSMUSG00000039716 |
| UniProt | Q8IZD9 | Q8CIQ7 |
| RefSeq (mRNA) | NM_004947 | NM_153413 |
| RefSeq (protein) | NP_004938 | n/a |
| Location (UCSC) | Chr 3: 50.67 – 51.38 Mb | Chr 9: 106.77 – 107.11 Mb |
| PubMed search |
- Wikidata
| View/Edit Human | View/Edit Mouse |

Dedicator of cytokinesis protein 3 (Dock3), also known as MOCA (modifier of cell adhesion) and PBP (presenilin-binding protein), is a large (~180 kDa) protein encoded in the human by the DOCK3 gene, involved in intracellular signalling networks. It is a member of the DOCK-B subfamily of the DOCK family of guanine nucleotide exchange factors (GEFs) which function as activators of small G-proteins. Dock3 specifically activates the small G protein Rac.

== Discovery ==
Dock3 was originally discovered in a screen for proteins that bind presenilin (a transmembrane protein which is mutated in early onset Alzheimer's disease). Dock3 is specifically expressed in neurons (primarily in the cerebral cortex and hippocampus).

== Structure and function ==
Dock3 is part of a large class of proteins (GEFs) which contribute to cellular signalling events by activating small G proteins. In their resting state G proteins are bound to Guanosine diphosphate (GDP) and their activation requires the dissociation of GDP and binding of guanosine triphosphate (GTP). GEFs activate G proteins by promoting this nucleotide exchange.

Dock3 exhibits the same domain arrangement as Dock180 (a member of the DOCK-A subfamily and the archetypal member of the DOCK family) and these proteins share a considerable (40%) degree of sequence similarity.

== Regulation ==
Since Dock3 shares the same domain arrangement as Dock180 it is predicted to have a similar array of binding partners, although this has yet to be demonstrated. It contains an N-terminal SH3 domain, which in Dock180 binds ELMO (a family of adaptor proteins which mediate recruitment and efficient GEF activity of Dock180), and a C-terminal proline-rich region which, in Dock180, binds the adaptor protein CRK.

== Downstream signalling ==
Dock3 GEF activity is directed specifically at Rac1. Dock3 has not been shown to interact with Rac3, another Rac protein which is expressed in neuronal cells, and this may be because Rac3 is primarily located in the perinuclear region. In fact, Rac1 and Rac3 appear to have distinct and antagonistic roles in these cells. Dock3-mediated Rac1 activation promotes reorganisation of the cytoskeleton in SH-SY5Y neuroblastoma cells and primary cortical neurones as well as morphological changes in fibroblasts. It has also been shown to regulate neurite outgrowth and cell-cell adhesion in B103 and PC12 cells.

== In neurological disorders ==
The first indication that Dock3 might be involved in neurological disorders came when Dock3 was shown to bind to presenilin, a transmembrane enzyme involved in the generation of beta amyloid (Aβ), accumulation of which is an important step in the development of Alzheimer's disease. Dock3 has been shown to undergo redistribution and association with neurofibrillary tangles in brain samples from patients with Alzheimer's disease. A mutation in Dock3 was also identified in a family displaying a phenotype resembling attention-deficit hyperactivity disorder (ADHD).
