= GDP-glucosidase =

Class of enzymes

Identifiers
- EC no.: 3.2.1.42
- CAS no.: 37288-36-1

Databases
- BRENDA: enzyme data
- ExPASy: NiceZyme view
- KEGG: enzyme entry
- MetaCyc: metabolic pathway
- Rhea: reactions
- PDB structures: RCSB PDB PDBe PDBsum
- Gene Ontology: AmiGO / QuickGO
Search
- PMC: articles
- PubMed: articles
- NCBI: proteins

The enzyme GDP-glucosidase (EC 3.2.1.42) catalyzes the chemical reaction

GDP-glucose
H_{2}O
D-glucose
+
guanosine diphosphate

The enzyme characterised from yeast hydrolyses guanosine diphosphate glucose (GDP-glucose) to D-glucose and guanosine diphosphate.

This enzyme is a hydrolase, specifically a glycosidase that hydrolyse O- and S-glycosyl compounds. The systematic name of this enzyme class is GDP-glucose glucohydrolase. Other names in use include guanosine diphosphoglucosidase, and guanosine diphosphate D-glucose glucohydrolase.
