= Guanosine-3',5'-bis(diphosphate) 3'-diphosphatase =

Class of enzymes

guanosine-3′,5′-bis(diphosphate) 3′-diphosphatase

Identifiers
- EC no.: 3.1.7.2
- CAS no.: 70457-12-4

Databases
- BRENDA: enzyme data
- ExPASy: NiceZyme view
- KEGG: enzyme entry
- MetaCyc: metabolic pathway
- Rhea: reactions
- PDB structures: RCSB PDB PDBe PDBsum
- Gene Ontology: AmiGO / QuickGO
Search
- PMC: articles
- PubMed: articles
- NCBI: proteins

The enzyme guanosine-3′,5′-bis(diphosphate) 3′-diphosphatase (EC 3.1.7.2) catalyzes the reaction

guanosine 3',5'-bis(diphosphate)
H_{2}O
PP_{i}
guanosine diphosphate

The enzyme characterised from Escherichia coli and other bacteria hydrolyses guanosine 3',5'-bis(diphosphate) to guanosine diphosphate and pyrophosphate (PP_{i}).

This enzyme is a hydrolase, specifically one acting on diphosphoric monoester bonds. The systematic name is guanosine-3′,5′-bis(diphosphate) 3′-diphosphohydrolase. Other names in use include guanosine-3′,5′-bis(diphosphate) 3′-pyrophosphatase, PpGpp-3'-pyrophosphohydrolase, and PpGpp phosphohydrolase.

== Structural studies ==
As of late 2007, only one structure has been solved for this class of enzymes, with the PDB accession code PDB: 1VJ7.
