= CDC25 =

CDC25 can refer to:

- Cdc25, a cell division cycle protein
- Another name for ras-GRF1, a guanine nucleotide exchange factor
