= TCL1 MTCP1 protein domain =

Protein domain

TCL1_MTCP1
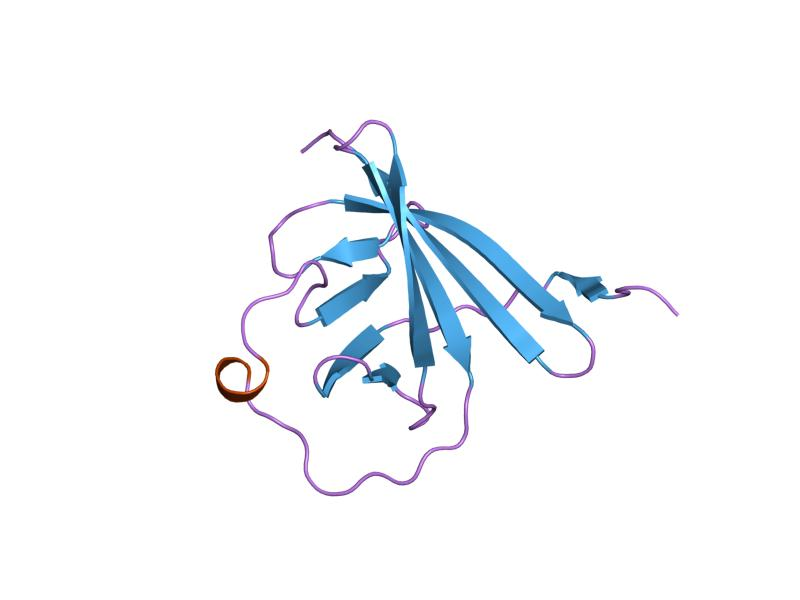
- crystal structure of p14tcl1, an oncogene product involved in t-cell prolymphocytic leukemia, reveals a novel b-barrel topology

Identifiers
- Symbol: TCL1_MTCP1
- Pfam: PF01840
- InterPro: IPR004832
- SCOP2: 1jsg / SCOPe / SUPFAM
Available protein structures:
- PDB: IPR004832 PF01840 (ECOD; PDBsum)
- AlphaFold: IPR004832; PF01840

In molecular biology, TCL-1/MTCP-1 is a protein domain found in proteins encoded for by two related protooncogenes, other words by genes that help promote cancer. They are, T-cell leukemia/lymphoma protein 1A TCL1A encoded by oncogene TCL-1 SWISSPROT and Protein p13 MTCP-1 encoded by MTCP-1 SWISSPROT.

These are overexpressed in T cell prolymphocytic leukemias as a result of chromosomal rearrangements that involve the translocation of one T cell receptor gene to either chromosome 14q32 or Xq28.

== Function ==
Enhances the phosphorylation and activation of Akt. Once Akt is activated this will in turn trigger cell survival. Further more it helps to stabilise mitochondrial membrane potential.

== Structure ==
This protein exists as a homodimer. It interacts with AKT1, AKT2 and AKT3 via the PH protein domain. It interacts with PNPT1; the interaction has no effect on PNPT1 exonuclease activity.
