= Dedicator of cytokinesis protein 5 =

Protein found in humans

DOCK5

Identifiers
- Aliases: DOCK5, Dock5, dedicator of cytokinesis 5
- External IDs: OMIM: 616904; MGI: 2652871; GeneCards: DOCK5

Gene location (Human)
Chr.	Chromosome 8 (human)
Band	8p21.2	Start	25,184,689 bp
Band	8p21.2	End	25,418,082 bp

Gene location (Mouse)
Chr.	Chromosome 14 (mouse)
Band	14|14 D1	Start	67,989,584 bp
Band	14|14 D1	End	68,170,891 bp
RNA expression pattern
Bgee	Human / Mouse (ortholog); Top expressed in: mucosa of ileum; sural nerve; corpus callosum; inferior ganglion of vagus nerve; blood; pons; germinal epithelium; internal globus pallidus; subthalamic nucleus; pancreatic epithelial cell / Top expressed in: epithelium of lens; granulocyte; secondary oocyte; zygote; gastrula; ciliary body; Ileal epithelium; retinal pigment epithelium; primary oocyte; decidua; More reference expression data
BioGPS	n/a
Gene ontology
Molecular function	guanyl-nucleotide exchange factor activity; protein binding; GTPase activator activity
Cellular component	plasma membrane; membrane; cytoplasm; cytosol
Biological process	small GTPase mediated signal transduction; negative regulation of vascular associated smooth muscle contraction; positive regulation of vascular associated smooth muscle cell migration; positive regulation of substrate adhesion-dependent cell spreading; positive regulation of epithelial cell migration; cell migration; positive regulation of GTPase activity
Sources:Amigo / QuickGO
Orthologs
Databases	NCBI: entry; OMA: entry
Species	Human	Mouse
Entrez	80005	68813
Ensembl	ENSG00000147459	ENSMUSG00000044447
UniProt	Q9H7D0	B2RY04
RefSeq (mRNA)	NM_024940; NM_001322810	NM_177780
RefSeq (protein)	NP_001309739; NP_079216	NP_808448
Location (UCSC)	Chr 8: 25.18 – 25.42 Mb	Chr 14: 67.99 – 68.17 Mb
PubMed search
- Wikidata
View/Edit Human	View/Edit Mouse

Dedicator of cytokinesis protein 5 (Dock5) is a large (~180 kDa) protein encoded in the human by the DOCK5 gene, involved in intracellular signalling networks. It is a member of the DOCK-A subfamily of the DOCK family of guanine nucleotide exchange factors (GEFs) which function as activators of small G-proteins. Dock5 is predicted to activate the small G protein Rac.

== Function ==
Dock5 shares significant sequence identity with Dock180, the archetypal member of the DOCK family. It is therefore predicted to partake in similar interactions although this has yet to be demonstrated. Indeed, the function and signalling properties of Dock5 are poorly understood thus far. Dock5 has been identified as a crucial signalling protein in osteoclasts, and suppression of Dock5 expression with shRNA has been shown to inhibit survival and differentiation of osteoclast precursor cells. In addition, a mutation in Dock5 has been associated with the rupture of murine lens cataracts. In zebrafish Dock5 has been implicated in myoblast fusion.
