= PREX1 =

Protein-coding gene in the species Homo sapiens

Identifiers
- Aliases: PREX1, P-REX1, phosphatidylinositol-3,4,5-trisphosphate dependent Rac exchange factor 1
- External IDs: OMIM: 606905; MGI: 3040696; GeneCards: PREX1
Available structures
PDB	Ortholog search: PDBe RCSB
PDB	List of PDB id codes 3QIK, 4YON, 5D3W, 5D3V, 5FI0, 5D27, 5D3Y, 5FI1, 5D3X

Gene location (Human)
Chr.	Chromosome 20 (human)
Band	20q13.13	Start	48,624,252 bp
Band	20q13.13	End	48,827,999 bp

Gene location (Mouse)
Chr.	Chromosome 2 (mouse)
Band	2|2 H3	Start	166,408,262 bp
Band	2|2 H3	End	166,555,752 bp
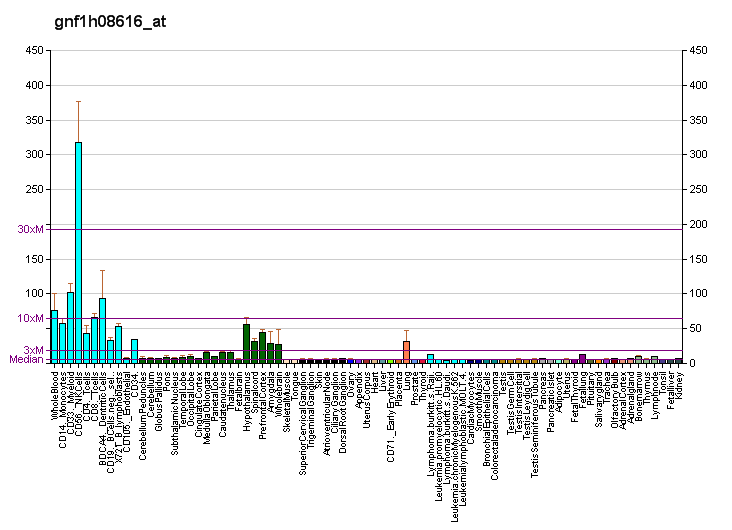
RNA expression pattern
Bgee	Human / Mouse (ortholog); Top expressed in: inferior ganglion of vagus nerve; blood; corpus callosum; C1 segment; granulocyte; ganglionic eminence; right lung; subthalamic nucleus; external globus pallidus; substantia nigra / Top expressed in: granulocyte; decidua; lymph node; gastrula; mesenteric lymph nodes; thymus; membranous bone; trigeminal ganglion; tail of embryo; superior frontal gyrus; More reference expression data
BioGPS	More reference expression data
Gene ontology
Molecular function	GTPase activator activity; protein binding; enzyme binding; phospholipid binding; guanyl-nucleotide exchange factor activity
Cellular component	membrane; growth cone; plasma membrane; dendritic shaft; perinuclear region of cytoplasm; cytoplasm; cytosol
Biological process	intracellular signal transduction; neutrophil activation; regulation of dendrite development; neutrophil chemotaxis; reactive oxygen species metabolic process; regulation of actin filament polymerization; actin filament polymerization; positive regulation of GTPase activity; positive regulation of substrate adhesion-dependent cell spreading; T cell differentiation; regulation of Rho protein signal transduction; superoxide metabolic process; positive regulation of cell adhesion; negative regulation of protein kinase activity; positive regulation of cell migration; negative regulation of TOR signaling; positive regulation of apoptotic process; regulation of small GTPase mediated signal transduction; G protein-coupled receptor signaling pathway
Sources:Amigo / QuickGO
Orthologs
Databases	NCBI: entry; OMA: entry
Species	Human	Mouse
Entrez	57580	277360
Ensembl	ENSG00000124126	ENSMUSG00000039621
UniProt	Q8TCU6	Q69ZK0
RefSeq (mRNA)	NM_020820	NM_177782
RefSeq (protein)	NP_065871	NP_808450
Location (UCSC)	Chr 20: 48.62 – 48.83 Mb	Chr 2: 166.41 – 166.56 Mb
PubMed search
- Wikidata
View/Edit Human	View/Edit Mouse

Phosphatidylinositol 3,4,5-trisphosphate-dependent Rac exchanger 1 protein is a protein that in humans is encoded by the PREX1 gene.

== Function ==
The protein encoded by this gene acts as a guanine nucleotide exchange factor for the RHO family of small GTP-binding proteins (RACs). It has been shown to bind to and activate RAC1 by exchanging bound GDP for free GTP. The encoded protein, which is found mainly in the cytoplasm, is activated by phosphatidylinositol-3,4,5-trisphosphate and the beta-gamma subunits of heterotrimeric G proteins. The activation of P-REX1 is efficient when chemotactic receptors coupled to Gi proteins are activated, as a consequence of a better release of the Gβɣ heterodimer.

== Clinical significance ==
The protein has been implicated in the spread of melanoma skin cancer.
