= Dock4-Ex49 =

Protein in Homo sapiens

Dock4-Ex49 is a splice variant of the signalling protein Dock4 (Dedicator of cytokinesis 4). It has been found in the brain, inner ear and eye. It is able to bind and activate the small G protein Rac and may regulate the organisation of the actin cytoskeleton in the Stereocilia of the inner ear.
