= Kalirin =

Protein-coding gene in the species Homo sapiens

KALRN

Identifiers
- Aliases: KALRN, ARHGEF24, CHD5, CHDS5, DUET, DUO, HAPIP, TRAD, kalirin, RhoGEF kinase, kalirin RhoGEF kinase
- External IDs: OMIM: 604605; MGI: 2685385; GeneCards: KALRN
Available structures
PDB	Ortholog search: PDBe RCSB
PDB	List of PDB id codes 1WFW
Enzyme activity
EC #	BRENDA	ExPASy	KEGG	MetaCyc
2.7.11.1	↗	↗	↗	↗

Gene location (Human)
Chr.	Chromosome 3 (human)
Band	3q21.1-q21.2	Start	124,033,369 bp
Band	3q21.1-q21.2	End	124,726,325 bp

Gene location (Mouse)
Chr.	Chromosome 16 (mouse)
Band	16|16 B3	Start	33,789,443 bp
Band	16|16 B3	End	34,393,902 bp
RNA expression pattern
Bgee	Human / Mouse (ortholog); Top expressed in: secondary oocyte; frontal pole; Brodmann area 10; ascending aorta; Descending thoracic aorta; right coronary artery; dorsolateral prefrontal cortex; primary visual cortex; right frontal lobe; sural nerve / Top expressed in: cingulate gyrus; primary motor cortex; prefrontal cortex; CA3 field; dentate gyrus; visual cortex; primary visual cortex; Region I of hippocampus proper; dentate gyrus of hippocampal formation granule cell; hippocampus proper; More reference expression data
BioGPS	n/a
Gene ontology
Molecular function	transferase activity; nucleotide binding; protein kinase activity; guanyl-nucleotide exchange factor activity; metal ion binding; kinase activity; protein serine/threonine kinase activity; protein binding; ATP binding; GTPase activator activity
Cellular component	cytoplasm; actin cytoskeleton; extracellular exosome; cytoskeleton; nucleoplasm; cytosol; postsynaptic density
Biological process	intracellular signal transduction; phosphorylation; ephrin receptor signaling pathway; nervous system development; protein phosphorylation; positive regulation of apoptotic process; regulation of Rho protein signal transduction; regulation of small GTPase mediated signal transduction; vesicle-mediated transport; signal transduction; positive regulation of dendritic spine morphogenesis; behavioral response to cocaine; behavioral fear response; social behavior; regulation of protein localization to plasma membrane; positive regulation of GTPase activity; regulation of synaptic transmission, glutamatergic; memory; positive regulation of dendritic spine development; Rho protein signal transduction; neuromuscular junction development; lactation; adult locomotory behavior; response to mechanical stimulus; smooth muscle cell migration; maternal behavior; habituation; regulation of neuronal synaptic plasticity; smooth muscle cell proliferation; negative regulation of growth hormone secretion; maternal process involved in parturition; behavioral response to formalin induced pain; positive regulation of long-term synaptic potentiation; G protein-coupled receptor signaling pathway
Sources:Amigo / QuickGO
Orthologs
Databases	NCBI: entry; OMA: entry
Species	Human	Mouse
Entrez	8997	545156
Ensembl	ENSG00000160145	ENSMUSG00000061751
UniProt	O60229	A2CG49
RefSeq (mRNA)	NM_001024660; NM_003947; NM_007064; NM_001322988; NM_001322989 NM_001322990; NM_001322991; NM_001322992; NM_001322993; NM_001322994; NM_001322995; NM_001322996; NM_001322997; NM_001322998; NM_001322999; NM_001323000; NM_001323001; NM_001388412; NM_001388413; NM_001388414; NM_001388415; NM_001388416; NM_001388417; NM_001388418; NM_001388419	NM_001164268; NM_177357
RefSeq (protein)	NP_001019831; NP_001309917; NP_001309918; NP_001309919; NP_001309920 NP_001309921; NP_001309922; NP_001309923; NP_001309924; NP_001309925; NP_001309926; NP_001309927; NP_001309928; NP_001309929; NP_001309930; NP_003938; NP_008995	NP_001157740; NP_796331
Location (UCSC)	Chr 3: 124.03 – 124.73 Mb	Chr 16: 33.79 – 34.39 Mb
PubMed search
- Wikidata
View/Edit Human	View/Edit Mouse

Kalirin, also known as Huntingtin-associated protein-interacting protein (HAPIP), protein duo (DUO), or serine/threonine-protein kinase with Dbl- and pleckstrin homology domain, is a protein that in humans is encoded by the KALRN gene. Kalirin was first identified in 1997 as a protein interacting with huntingtin-associated protein 1. Is also known to play an important role in nerve growth and axonal development.

Kalirin is a member of the Dbl family of proteins and is a Rho guanine nucleotide exchange factor.

It is named after the multiple-handed Hindu goddess Kali for its ability to interact with numerous other proteins. Kalirin's other name, DUO, comes from the fact that it is 98% identical to rat DUO protein and 80.6% identical to a human protein named TRIO. Unlike TRIO, which is expressed in numerous tissues, Kalirin isoforms are mainly found in the brain.

== Clinical significance ==
Several isoforms of Kalirin are produced through alternative splicing. One of the isoforms, Kalirin-7, was found to be necessary for the remodeling of synapses in mature cortical neurons and is thought to be important in the development of schizophrenia, as demonstrated by adolescent development of schizophrenia-like symptoms in kalirin knockout mice. Alzheimer's disease may also be linked to kalirin-7.

The KALRN gene, has been linked to multiple neurological disorders both through large exome and genome sequencing efforts, as well as post mortem and clinical studies.

Several mutations within KALRN have been linked to neurological disease. In autism spectrum disorder, a frameshift mutation was found that is likely to lead to transcript decay, and heterozygosity. Another, found within the second GEF domain, is predicted to be highly deleterious to RhoA-GEF activity and likely affects the function of kalirin9 and 12 isoforms early in neuronal development. A patient harboring a homozygous mutation in kalirin's spectrin repeat domain was found to have severe intellectual disability, and both truncating and missense mutations have been identified in patients with developmental delay. Several intronic variants have been associated with addiction and were found to alter the function of brain regions responsible for reward anticipation. This link to addiction is supported by animal models, where loss of kalirin results in altered cocaine self-administration and synaptic and expression changes in response to cocaine. Perhaps the most compelling genetic links are between kalirin and schizophrenia. Numerous missense mutations in KALRN have been identified in exome sequencing studies of schizophrenia cohorts that are predicted to be deleterious to protein function.

Neuronal studies have provided insight into the mechanisms of some missense mutations, particularly within the GEF domains of KALRN. A mutation found within the Rac-GEF domain was found to induce strong reductions in Rac activation, neuronal branching, and spine density. These effects were mirrored by mutations in the RhoA-GEF domain, producing similar neuronal deficits, but by promoting RhoA-GEF activity. In addition to exome sequencing, post-mortem studies have consistently found alterations in kalirin transcript levels within the brain further supporting a role for kalirin in the etiology of schizophrenia.

In addition to neurodevelopmental disorders, kalirin has been found to be underexpressed in the post-mortem Alzheimer's brain. This loss of kalirin expression was recapitulated in animal models of Alzheimer's disease. Moreover, introduction of kalirin7 into culture or animal models of Alzheimer's disease was able to rescue synaptic and behavioral deficits, suggesting an important role for kalirin in regulating synapse loss and cognitive impairment in Alzheimer's disease.

== Function ==
The majority of kalirin's effects are induced through its catalytic GEF domain signaling. By promoting the release of GDP from Rac and RhoA, it acts as an activator of GTPase signaling within the cell. Although able to activate Rac and RhoA, much of its activity in regulating neuronal morphology has been attributed to Rac-PAK pathway activation. kalirin has found been found to exert control over dendritic arborization, axonal growth, dendritic spine formation and synaptic activity and plasticity. These effects are regulated by protein-protein interactions and post-translational modifications within the non-catalytic domains, and have been shown to exert control over kalirin subcellular targeting and activation.

Kalirin has been found to play a critical role in synaptic activity and plasticity. Loss of KALRN results in decreased nMDAr and AMPAr-mediated mEPSC, and kalirin7 knockout animals show strong deficits in NMDAr mediated long-term potentiation and long term depression. This may be linked to the ability to regulate RAC-PAK signaling and actin dynamics, which in turn can regulate the size and density of dendritic spines. Within dendritic spines, kalirin interacts with multiple disease-related proteins to regulate synapse strength. It directly interacts with the schizophrenia risk factor DISC1 that can act to suppress kalirin function within the spine. Furthermore, kalirin7 directly interacts with the GluN2B subunit of the NMDA receptor and PSD95 within the post-synaptic density.

The importance of KALRN in neurodevelopment is supported by knockout animal models that display profound deficiencies in multiple behavioral tasks. Kalirin knockout animals display reduced GEF activity, dendritic arborization and spine density. These deficits may be linked to the observed reductions in prepulse inhibition, sociability and increased locomotor activity. Notably, loss of kalirin results in deficits in working memory, but not reference memory. The generation of a kalirin7 specific knockout animal model revealed similar deficits in spine density, suggesting a central role of kalirin7 in regulating neuronal connectivity. Both full and kalirin7 specific knockout animals show decreased anxiety-like behavior and impaired contextual fear learning.

== Expression ==
Multiple isoforms, arising from alternate splicing and promoter usage, display varying tissue and developmental expression. Control over kalirin expression is exerted through the use of alternate promoters which produce alternate start sites and restrict expression to specific neuronal subpopulations, and alter kalirin activity within neurons. During early development, the long kalirin9 and 12 isoforms are predominant in the brain. These isoforms contain both a Rac and a RhoA selective GEF domain, and control axonal growth and dendritic branching. Kalirin9 and 12 are also expressed ubiquitously throughout the body and have functions outside the brain. However, during neurodevelopment, the kalirin7 isoform is preferentially expressed during periods of synaptogenesis, and this isoform displays highly restricted cortical expression. Kalirin7 expresses only the N-terminal domains, including the Rac-GEF domain along with a c-terminal PDZ-binding domain that strongly targets kalirin7 to the post-synaptic density. It is likely this subcellular distribution is vital to kalirin7 function, as this isoform exerts control dendritic spine density and synaptic plasticity. It is likely that mutations that result in deregulation of kalirin function within the brain is responsible for the role of kalirin within multiple neurological disorders.
