= TCL (GTPase) =

Small signaling G protein

TCL is a small (~21 kDa) signaling G protein (more specifically a GTPase), and is a member of the Rho family of GTPases.

TCL (TC10-like) shares 85% and 78% amino acid similarity to TC10 and Cdc42, respectively. TCL mRNA is 2.5 kb long and is mainly expressed in heart. In vitro, TCL shows rapid GDP/GTP exchange and displays higher GTP dissociation and hydrolysis rates than TC10. Like other Rac/Cdc42/RhoUV members, GTP-bound TCL interacts with CRIB domains, such as those found in PAK and WASP. TCL produces large and dynamic F-actin-rich ruffles on the dorsal cell membrane in REF-52 fibroblasts. TCL activity is blocked by dominant negative Rac1 and Cdc42 mutants, suggesting a cross-talk between these three Rho GTPases.

== N-terminus Regulation ==
TCL/RhoJ nucleotide exchange is influenced by amino acid regions outside of the nucleotide-bounding pocket though an allosteric regulation. One regulatory region is the N-terminus of TCL, which includes an extension of about 20 amino acids compared with Cdc42. Deletion of the TCL N-terminus produces a defect in GTP loading and exchange, with the effect mapped to the DEKK sequence consisting of Asp-17, Glu-18, Lys-19.

A second regulatory sequence distal of TCL includes the R2c subregion, which contributes to TCL-specific nucleotide loading. In TC10 reverse chimeras' experiments, insertion of TCL R2c region resulted into impaired nucleotide binding, while the same region inserted into Cdc42 did not inhibit nucleotide exchange.

== Disease Relevance ==
Hypoxia induced TCL expression has been linked to an epigenetic pathway involving myocardial related transcription factors (MRTF-A) and histone acetyltransferase, hMOF. Under hypoxic conditions, MRTF-A activates hMOF which acetylates the TCL promoter, resulting in the increase of colorectal cancer cell migration and invasion.

TCL is unrelated to TCL1A, a proto-oncogene implicated in the development of T-Cell Leukemias.

== See also ==
- TCL1A
