= Pleckstrin homology and RhoGEF domain containing G3 =

Protein-coding gene in the species Homo sapiens

PLEKHG3

Identifiers
- Aliases: PLEKHG3, ARHGEF43, KIAA0599, pleckstrin homology and RhoGEF domain containing G3
- External IDs: OMIM: 617940; MGI: 2388284; GeneCards: PLEKHG3

Gene location (Human)
Chr.	Chromosome 14 (human)
Band	14q23.3	Start	64,704,102 bp
Band	14q23.3	End	64,750,249 bp

Gene location (Mouse)
Chr.	Chromosome 12 (mouse)
Band	12|12 C3	Start	76,577,665 bp
Band	12|12 C3	End	76,627,262 bp
RNA expression pattern
Bgee	Human / Mouse (ortholog); Top expressed in: sural nerve; popliteal artery; tibial arteries; right coronary artery; corpus callosum; granulocyte; body of uterus; C1 segment; left uterine tube; left coronary artery / Top expressed in: ascending aorta; granulocyte; zygote; aortic valve; primary oocyte; molar; secondary oocyte; tail of embryo; lip; gastrula; More reference expression data
BioGPS	n/a
Orthologs
Databases	NCBI: entry; OMA: entry
Species	Human	Mouse
Entrez	26030	263406
Ensembl	ENSG00000126822	ENSMUSG00000052609
UniProt	A1L390	Q4VAC9
RefSeq (mRNA)	NM_001308147; NM_015549	NM_153804
RefSeq (protein)	NP_001295076	NP_722499; NP_001390126; NP_001390127
Location (UCSC)	Chr 14: 64.7 – 64.75 Mb	Chr 12: 76.58 – 76.63 Mb
PubMed search
- Wikidata
View/Edit Human	View/Edit Mouse

Pleckstrin homology and RhoGEF domain containing G3 is a protein that in humans is encoded by the PLEKHG3 gene.

== See also ==
- Pleckstrin homology domain
- RhoGEF domain
