= PLEKHG2 =

Protein-coding gene in the species Homo sapiens

Identifiers
- Aliases: PLEKHG2, ARHGEF42, CLG, LDAMD, pleckstrin homology and RhoGEF domain containing G2, CTB-60E11.4
- External IDs: OMIM: 611893; MGI: 2141874; GeneCards: PLEKHG2

Gene location (Human)
| Chr. | Chromosome 19 (human) |
| Band | 19q13.2 | Start | 39,412,669 bp |
| Band | 19q13.2 | End | 39,428,415 bp |

Gene location (Mouse)
| Chr. | Chromosome 7 (mouse) |
| Band | 7 A3|7 16.71 cM | Start | 28,359,604 bp |
| Band | 7 A3|7 16.71 cM | End | 28,372,599 bp |
RNA expression pattern
| Bgee | Human / Mouse (ortholog); Top expressed in: sural nerve; Descending thoracic aorta; right coronary artery; left uterine tube; ascending aorta; appendix; ganglionic eminence; gastric mucosa; bone marrow cell; stromal cell of endometrium / Top expressed in: internal carotid artery; external carotid artery; tail of embryo; genital tubercle; vas deferens; thymus; abdominal wall; Rostral migratory stream; tunica media of zone of aorta; ventricular zone; More reference expression data |
| BioGPS | n/a |
Gene ontology
| Molecular function | protein binding; guanyl-nucleotide exchange factor activity |
| Cellular component | cytosol |
| Biological process | regulation of Rho protein signal transduction; regulation of small GTPase mediated signal transduction; positive regulation of apoptotic process; regulation of actin filament polymerization; G protein-coupled receptor signaling pathway |
Sources:Amigo / QuickGO
Orthologs
| Databases | NCBI: entry; OMA: entry |
| Species | Human | Mouse |
| Entrez | 64857 | 101497 |
| Ensembl | ENSG00000090924 | ENSMUSG00000037552 |
| UniProt | Q9H7P9 | Q6KAU7 |
| RefSeq (mRNA) | NM_022835; NM_001351693; NM_001351694 | NM_001083912; NM_001290542; NM_138752 |
| RefSeq (protein) | NP_073746; NP_001338622; NP_001338623 | NP_001077381; NP_001277471; NP_620091 |
| Location (UCSC) | Chr 19: 39.41 – 39.43 Mb | Chr 7: 28.36 – 28.37 Mb |
| PubMed search |
- Wikidata
| View/Edit Human | View/Edit Mouse |

Pleckstrin homology domain containing, family G member 2 (PLEKHG2) is a protein that in humans is encoded by the PLEKHG2 gene. It is sometimes written as ARHGEF42, FLJ00018.

The PLEKHG2 protein is a huge protein of about 1300 amino acids, 130 kDa and has a Dbl homology (DH) domain and a pleckstrin homology (PH) domain near the N terminus of its structure. The DH domain is a domain responsible for guanine nucleotide exchange activity that converts GDP on the Rho family Small GTPase (RhoGTPase) to GTP, and PLEKHG2 having this domain also acts as a Rho-specific guanine nucleotide exchange factor (RhoGEF).

Activation of RhoGTPase reconstitute the actin cytoskeleton and changes the cell morphology, so PLEKHG2 might be contributes to cell motility and neuronal network development of neurons via RhoGTPase and actin remodeling (see later).

== Cloning ==
Recombinant BXH2 and AKXD inbred mice mutated by retroviral transduction are known to develop myeloid leukemia, B cell and T cell leukemia at high frequency.

In 2002, Himmel et al., used this model of acute myelogenous leukemia and showed that a novel Dbl family guanine nucleotide exchange factor gene is contained downstream of the retroviral uptake site called Evi24. They named this gene Clg. Hemmel and colleagues cloned Clg and showed homology with PLEKHG2 contained in human chromosome 19 chromosome 19q13.1 region. From these observations they pointed out association with acute myeloid leukemia.

== Functions ==
In a paper published by Hemmel et al., in 2002, they showed that a construct containing a DH-PH domain of Clg promotes guanine nucleotide exchange of Cdc42 but does not promote guanine nucleotide exchange of Rac1 or RhoA. In addition, DH-PH domains or full-length Clg were introduced into NIH3T3 cells and transformation occurred.

Later, Ueda and his colleagues introduced the expression construct of full-length human PLEKHG2 into HEK 293 cells. In this cell the Gβγ subunit of the trimeric G protein were interacted with PLEKHG2 directly. Ueda and colleagues also showed that PLEKHG2 were activated by Gbg and PLEKHG2 activates Rac1, Cdc42 of RhoGTPase and contributes to cell morphological change.

In 2013, Runne et al., showed that PLEKHG2 is elevated in several leukemia cell lines, including Jurkat T cells. In addition, they showed that GPCR signal-dependent activation of Rac and Cdc42 regulates the chemotaxis of lymphocytes via actin polymerization. From this observation PLEKHG2 was considered to an important regulator of cell motility.

Furthermore, in recent years, it has become clear that PLEKHG2 undergoes regulation through modification such as phosphorylation and interaction with other proteins by various intracellular signals (see the section on interaction / protein modification). However, the function in vivo is still unclear.

== Disease related with PLEKHG2 ==
In 2016, Edvardson et al., identified homozygosity for Arg204Trp mutation in the PLEKHG2 gene in the patients with dystonia or postnatal microcephaly.

== Interactions ==
PLEKHG2 is known to interacted with the following proteins.

・Gβγ

・β-actin

・Four and a Half LIM domain1 (FHL1)

・Gαs

== protein modification ==
It is known that PLEKHG2 undergoes modification such as phosphorylation by the following signals.

・SRC

・EGFR
