= ARHGEF35 =

Protein-coding gene in the species Homo sapiens

Identifiers
- Aliases: ARHGEF35, ARHGEF5L, Rho guanine nucleotide exchange factor 35
- External IDs: GeneCards: ARHGEF35

Gene location (Human)
Chr.	Chromosome 7 (human)
Band	7q35	Start	144,186,083 bp
Band	7q35	End	144,195,879 bp
RNA expression pattern
Bgee	Human / Mouse (ortholog); Top expressed in: mucosa of transverse colon; rectum; islet of Langerhans; duodenum; tonsil; zone of skin; skin of abdomen; skin of leg; mucosa of esophagus; olfactory zone of nasal mucosa / n/a; More reference expression data
BioGPS	n/a
Orthologs
Databases	NCBI: entry; OMA: entry
Species	Human	Mouse
Entrez	445328	n/a
Ensembl	ENSG00000213214; ENSG00000288422	n/a
UniProt	A5YM69	n/a
RefSeq (mRNA)	NM_001003702; NM_001368318	n/a
RefSeq (protein)	NP_001003702; NP_001355247	n/a
Location (UCSC)	Chr 7: 144.19 – 144.2 Mb	n/a
PubMed search		n/a
- Wikidata
View/Edit Human

Rho guanine nucleotide exchange factor (GEF) 35 is a protein in humans that is encoded by the ARHGEF35 gene.
