= Ras-GRF1 =

Guanine nucleotide exchange factor

RASGRF1

Identifiers
- Aliases: RASGRF1, CDC25, CDC25L, GNRP, GRF1, GRF55, H-GRF55, PP13187, ras-GRF1, Ras protein specific guanine nucleotide releasing factor 1
- External IDs: OMIM: 606600; MGI: 99694; GeneCards: RASGRF1
Available structures
PDB	Ortholog search: PDBe RCSB
PDB	List of PDB id codes 2IJE

Gene location (Human)
Chr.	Chromosome 15 (human)
Band	15q25.1	Start	78,959,906 bp
Band	15q25.1	End	79,090,780 bp

Gene location (Mouse)
Chr.	Chromosome 9 (mouse)
Band	9 E3.1|9 47.31 cM	Start	89,791,961 bp
Band	9 E3.1|9 47.31 cM	End	89,909,030 bp
RNA expression pattern
Bgee	Human / Mouse (ortholog); Top expressed in: C1 segment; right hemisphere of cerebellum; prefrontal cortex; right frontal lobe; Brodmann area 9; cingulate gyrus; anterior cingulate cortex; postcentral gyrus; islet of Langerhans; superior frontal gyrus / Top expressed in: pontine nuclei; paraventricular nucleus of hypothalamus; dorsal tegmental nucleus; dorsomedial hypothalamic nucleus; subiculum; motor neuron; arcuate nucleus; suprachiasmatic nucleus; lateral hypothalamus; anterior amygdaloid area; More reference expression data
BioGPS	n/a
Gene ontology
Molecular function	guanyl-nucleotide exchange factor activity; glutamate receptor binding
Cellular component	cytosol; growth cone; neuron projection; plasma membrane
Biological process	intracellular signal transduction; MAPK cascade; regulation of Rho protein signal transduction; positive regulation of GTPase activity; signal transduction; regulation of Rac protein signal transduction; regulation of synaptic plasticity; long-term memory; regulation of Ras protein signal transduction; regulation of neuronal synaptic plasticity; neuron projection development; regulation of NMDA receptor activity; activation of GTPase activity; cell population proliferation; small GTPase mediated signal transduction; positive regulation of Ras protein signal transduction; response to endoplasmic reticulum stress
Sources:Amigo / QuickGO
Orthologs
Databases	NCBI: entry; OMA: entry
Species	Human	Mouse
Entrez	5923	19417
Ensembl	ENSG00000058335	ENSMUSG00000032356
UniProt	Q13972	P27671
RefSeq (mRNA)	NM_001145648; NM_002891; NM_153815	NM_001039655; NM_011245; NM_001357743; NM_001357744
RefSeq (protein)	NP_001139120; NP_002882; NP_722522	NP_001034744; NP_035375; NP_001344672; NP_001344673
Location (UCSC)	Chr 15: 78.96 – 79.09 Mb	Chr 9: 89.79 – 89.91 Mb
PubMed search
- Wikidata
View/Edit Human	View/Edit Mouse

Ras protein-specific guanine nucleotide-releasing factor 1 (also known as Ras-GRF1) is a protein in humans that is encoded by the RASGRF1 gene.

Ras-GRF1 is a guanine nucleotide exchange factor. Its function is to release guanosine diphosphate, GDP, from the signaling protein RAS, thus increasing the activity of RAS by allowing it to bind to guanosine triphosphate, GTP, returning it to its active state. In this way, Ras-GRF1 has a key role in regulating the RAS signaling pathway. Ras-GRF1 mediates the activation of RAS via Ca^{2+} bound calmodulin protein.

== Function ==
Activation of Ras proteins occur through the phosphorylation of tyrosine receptors. This recruits adapter protein GRB2 which binds to SOS exchange factors, that bind and activate Ras. Ras/MAPK pathways is activated by the intracellular calcium that binds to the ilimaquinone domain (IQ) on Ras-GRF1. Activated Ras can go on to activate Raf/Mek/Erk kinases which can mediate the activation of CREB transcription factors. This can affect gene expression and cell proliferation.

Ras-GRF1 knockout mice have been shown to have learning and memory deficits associated with dysregulation of this pathway. Ras-GRF1 has also been shown to be upstream from IGF1, allowing it to control growth in mice. Although it is sometimes known as CDC25, it should not be confused with Cdc25. Ras-GRF1 is a paternally expressed imprinted gene, meaning that only the paternal allele of the gene is translated into protein. Disruption of this epigenetic imprinting also produces learning and memory deficits in neonatal mice.

Ras-GRF1 has been shown to mediate long term potentiation (LTP), affecting memory and learning. A signaling pathway involving Ras-GRF1/p38 MAP/CP -AMPAR has been shown to affect LTP. Ras-GRF1 knockout mice, induced with high frequency stimulation to induce LTP (HFS-LTP), displayed the inability to retain memory and distinguish similar concepts. A Ras-GRF1/ERK pathway has also been found to affect the activity of LTP in medium spiny neuron (MSN) pathways. Ras-GRF1 knockout mice treated with HFS-LTP have exhibited the inability to induce LTP in direct MSN pathways. Ras-GRF1 signaling has been thought to be involved with L-DOPA-induced dyskinesia, a condition in which LTP and MSN homeostasis are disrupted.

Alongside its regulation of learning and memory, Ras-GRF1 has exhibited the ability to impact pancreatic β-cell proliferation. Ras-GRF1 knockout mice have expressed decreased pancreatic β-cell concentration and activity. Reduction of β-cell mass and area has correlated to a decrease in circulating insulin levels, exposing a Ras-GRF1 signaling pathway that regulates glucose metabolism.
