= TCL1A =

Protein-coding gene in the species Homo sapiens

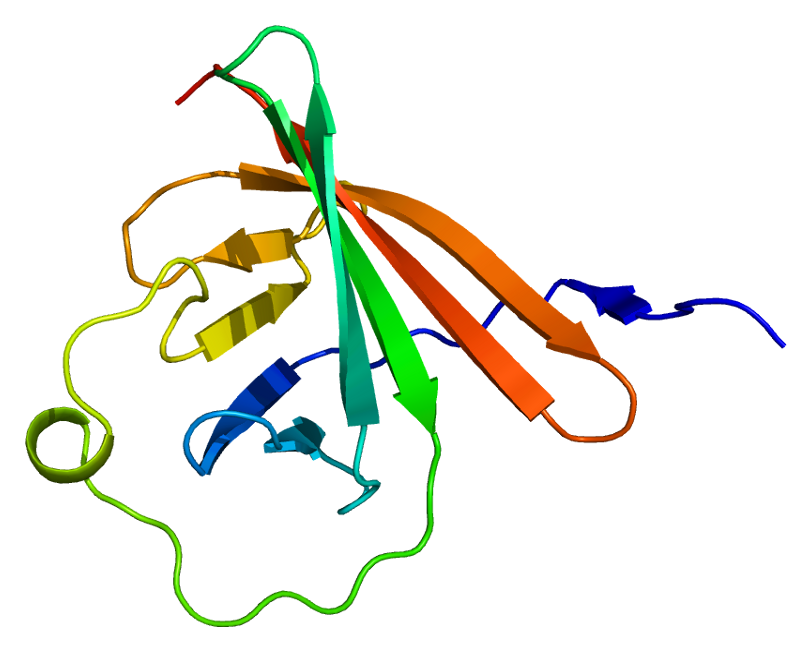
Available structures
PDB	Ortholog search: PDBe RCSB
PDB	List of PDB id codes 1JSG

Identifiers
- Aliases: TCL1A, TCL1, T-cell leukemia/lymphoma 1A, T cell leukemia/lymphoma 1A, TCL1 family AKT coactivator A
- External IDs: OMIM: 186960; MGI: 1097166; HomoloGene: 7565; GeneCards: TCL1A; OMA:TCL1A - orthologs

Gene location (Human)
Chr.	Chromosome 14 (human)
Band	14q32.13	Start	95,709,947 bp
Band	14q32.13	End	95,714,196 bp

Gene location (Mouse)
Chr.	Chromosome 12 (mouse)
Band	12 E|12 55.28 cM	Start	105,183,009 bp
Band	12 E|12 55.28 cM	End	105,189,052 bp
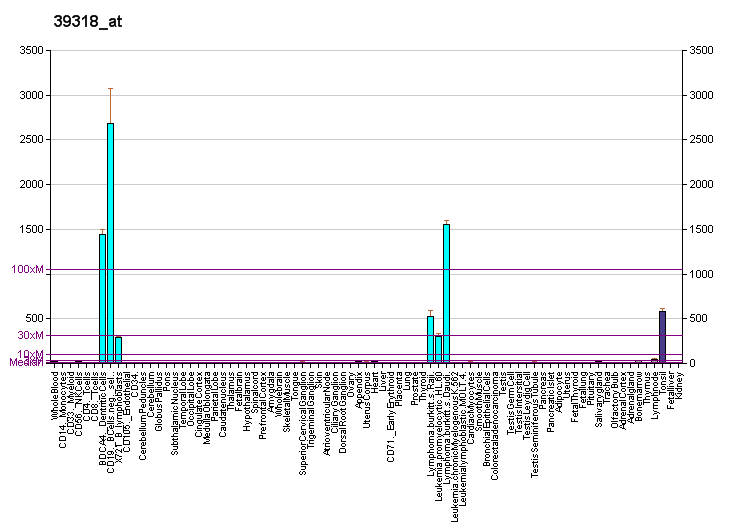

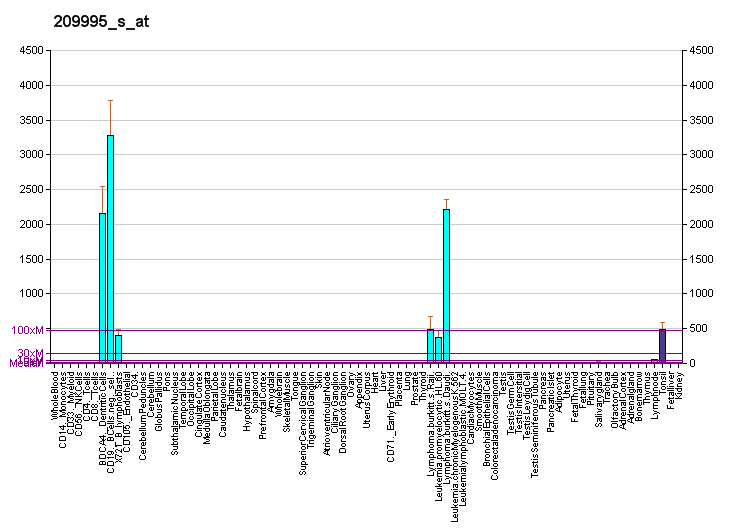
RNA expression pattern
Bgee	Human / Mouse (ortholog); Top expressed in: oocyte; secondary oocyte; gonad; granulocyte; lymph node; appendix; spleen; blood; testicle; bone marrow / Top expressed in: zygote; secondary oocyte; primary oocyte; blastocyst; morula; embryo; ovary; CA3 field; gastrula; Gonadal ridge; More reference expression data
BioGPS	More reference expression data
Gene ontology
Molecular function	protein binding; protein kinase binding; identical protein binding; protein serine/threonine kinase activator activity
Cellular component	cytoplasm; endoplasmic reticulum; intracellular membrane-bounded organelle; nucleus; protein-containing complex
Biological process	multicellular organism development; positive regulation of cell population proliferation; positive regulation of mitochondrial membrane potential; positive regulation of protein oligomerization; positive regulation of peptidyl-serine phosphorylation; negative regulation of apoptotic process; protein homotrimerization; cellular response to tumor necrosis factor; positive regulation of protein serine/threonine kinase activity
Sources:Amigo / QuickGO
Orthologs
Species	Human	Mouse
Entrez	8115	21432
Ensembl	ENSG00000100721	ENSMUSG00000041359
UniProt	P56279	P56280
RefSeq (mRNA)	NM_001098725; NM_021966	NM_001289468; NM_009337; NM_001309484; NM_001309485
RefSeq (protein)	NP_001092195; NP_068801; NP_001092195.1; NP_068801.1	NP_001276397; NP_001296413; NP_001296414; NP_033363
Location (UCSC)	Chr 14: 95.71 – 95.71 Mb	Chr 12: 105.18 – 105.19 Mb
PubMed search
- Wikidata
View/Edit Human	View/Edit Mouse

T-cell leukemia/lymphoma protein 1A is a protein that in humans is encoded by the TCL1A gene.

== Interactions ==
TCL1A has been shown to interact with AKT1 and AKT2.
