= TRIO (gene) =

Protein-coding gene in the species Homo sapiens

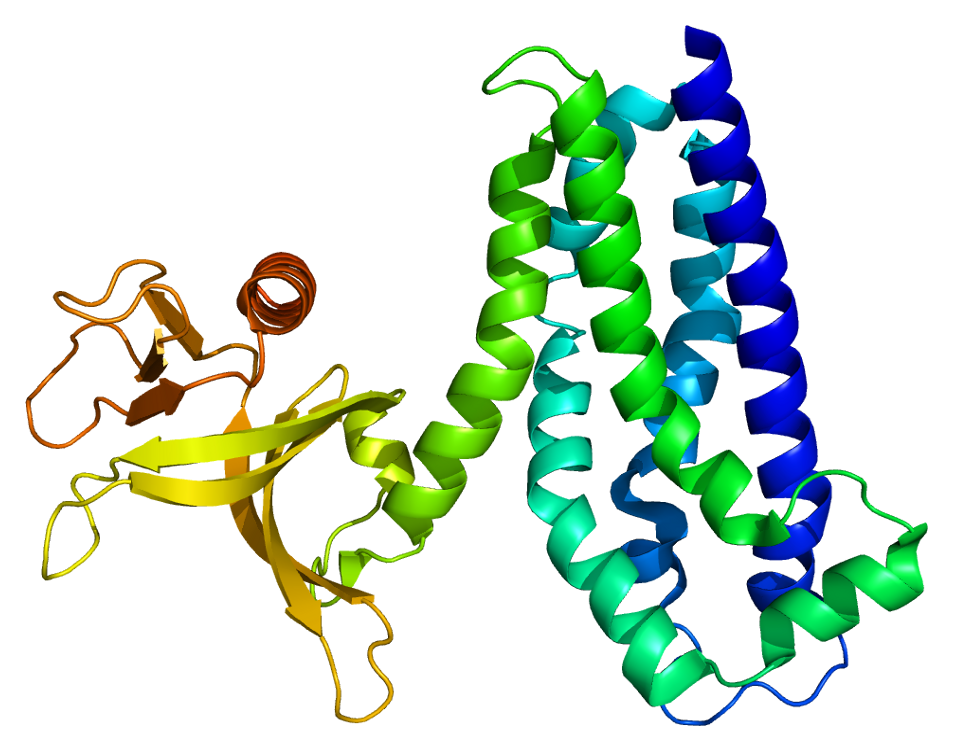

Identifiers
- Aliases: TRIO, ARHGEF23, tgat, trio Rho guanine nucleotide exchange factor, MEBAS, MRD44, MRD63, TRIO gene
- External IDs: OMIM: 601893; MGI: 1927230; GeneCards: TRIO
Available structures
PDB	Ortholog search: PDBe RCSB
PDB	List of PDB id codes 1NTY, 2NZ8
Enzyme activity
EC #	BRENDA	ExPASy	KEGG	MetaCyc
2.7.11.1	↗	↗	↗	↗

Gene location (Human)
Chr.	Chromosome 5 (human)
Band	5p15.2	Start	14,143,342 bp
Band	5p15.2	End	14,532,128 bp

Gene location (Mouse)
Chr.	Chromosome 15 (mouse)
Band	15|15 B1	Start	27,730,737 bp
Band	15|15 B1	End	28,025,934 bp
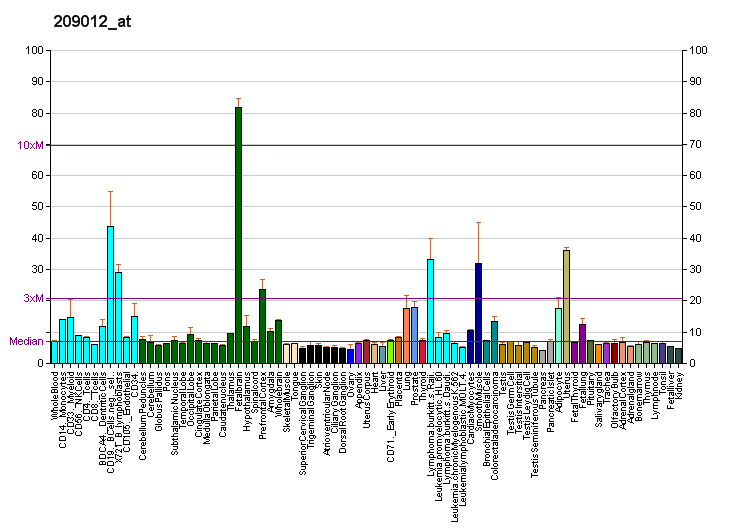

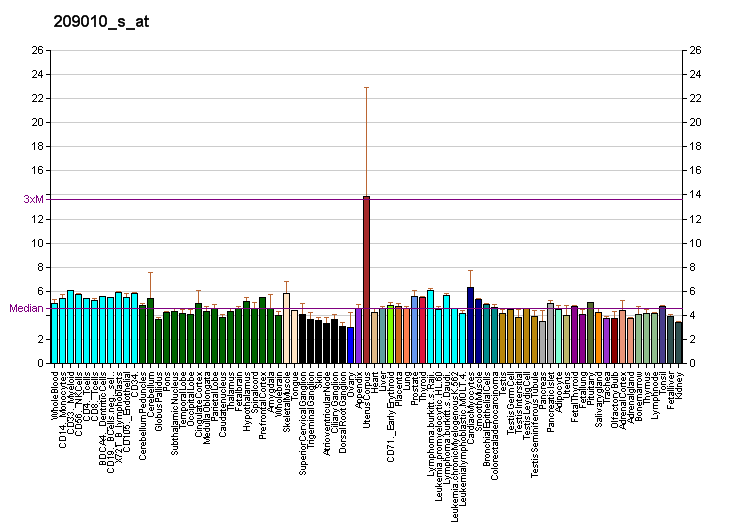

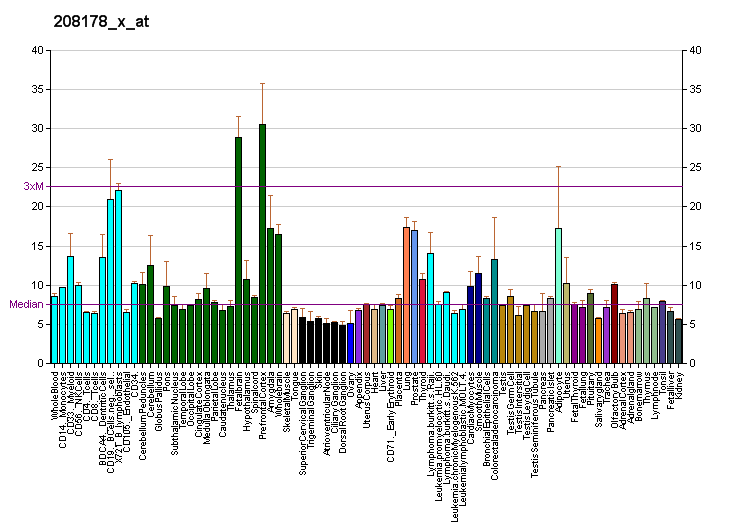
RNA expression pattern
Bgee	Human / Mouse (ortholog); Top expressed in: sural nerve; stromal cell of endometrium; gastric mucosa; ganglionic eminence; right hemisphere of cerebellum; right ovary; left ovary; Achilles tendon; epithelium of colon; body of uterus / Top expressed in: lateral septal nucleus; superior frontal gyrus; neural layer of retina; cerebellar cortex; internal carotid artery; human fetus; Rostral migratory stream; lateral geniculate nucleus; dentate gyrus of hippocampal formation granule cell; ventromedial nucleus; More reference expression data
BioGPS	More reference expression data
Gene ontology
Molecular function	transferase activity; nucleotide binding; protein kinase activity; guanyl-nucleotide exchange factor activity; kinase activity; protein serine/threonine kinase activity; protein binding; ATP binding
Cellular component	cytoplasm; cytosol
Biological process	phosphorylation; protein phosphorylation; transmembrane receptor protein tyrosine phosphatase signaling pathway; positive regulation of apoptotic process; regulation of Rho protein signal transduction; regulation of small GTPase mediated signal transduction; negative regulation of fat cell differentiation; G protein-coupled receptor signaling pathway; axon guidance; central nervous system development
Sources:Amigo / QuickGO
Orthologs
Databases	NCBI: entry; OMA: entry
Species	Human	Mouse
Entrez	7204	223435
Ensembl	ENSG00000038382	ENSMUSG00000022263
UniProt	O75962	Q0KL02
RefSeq (mRNA)	NM_007118	NM_001081302
RefSeq (protein)	NP_009049	NP_001074771
Location (UCSC)	Chr 5: 14.14 – 14.53 Mb	Chr 15: 27.73 – 28.03 Mb
PubMed search
- Wikidata
View/Edit Human	View/Edit Mouse

Triple functional domain protein is a protein that in humans is encoded by the TRIO gene.

== Interactions ==
TRIO (gene) has been shown to interact with Filamin and RHOA.
