= DHR2 domain =

Protein domain

DHR2 (DOCK homology region 2), also known as CZH2 or Docker2, is a protein domain of approximately 450-550 amino acids that is present in the DOCK family of proteins. This domain functions as a guanine nucleotide exchange factor (GEF) domain for small G proteins of the Rho family. DHR2 domains bear no significant similarity to the well described DH domain (Dbl homologous domain) present in other RhoGEFs such as Vav, P-Rex and TRIO. Indeed, the most divergent mammalian DHR2 domains share only 16-17% sequence similarity.
