= DHR1 domain =

DHR1 (DOCK homology region 1), also known as CZH1 or Docker1, is a protein domain of approximately 200–250 amino acids that is present in the DOCK family of signalling proteins. This domain binds phospholipids and so may assist in recruitment to cellular membranes. There is evidence that this domain may also mediate protein–protein interactions.
