= Small GTPase =

Class of enzymes

Small monomeric GTPase

Identifiers
- EC no.: 3.6.5.2

Databases
- BRENDA: enzyme data
- ExPASy: NiceZyme view
- KEGG: enzyme entry
- MetaCyc: metabolic pathway
- Rhea: reactions
- PDB structures: RCSB PDB PDBe PDBsum
Search
- PMC: articles
- PubMed: articles
- NCBI: proteins

Small GTPases (EC 3.6.5.2), also known as small G-proteins, are a family of hydrolase enzymes that can bind and hydrolyze guanosine triphosphate (GTP). They are a type of G-protein found in the cytosol that are homologous to the alpha subunit of heterotrimeric G-proteins, but unlike the alpha subunit of G proteins, a small GTPase can function independently as a hydrolase enzyme to bind to and hydrolyze a guanosine triphosphate (GTP) to form guanosine diphosphate (GDP). The best-known members are the Ras GTPases and hence they are sometimes called as Ras superfamily GTPases.

A typical G-protein is active when bound to GTP and inactive when bound to GDP (i.e. when the GTP is hydrolyzed to GDP). The GDP can then be replaced by free GTP. Therefore, a G-protein can be switched on and off. GTP hydrolysis is accelerated by GTPase activating proteins (GAPs), while GTP exchange is catalyzed by guanine nucleotide exchange factors (GEFs). Activation of a GEF typically activates its cognate G-protein, while activation of a GAP results in inactivation of the cognate G-protein. Guanosine nucleotide dissociation inhibitors (GDI) maintain small GTPases in the inactive state.

Small GTPases regulate a wide variety of processes in the cell, including growth, cellular differentiation, cell movement and lipid vesicle transport.

== The Ras superfamily ==
There are more than a hundred proteins in the Ras superfamily. Based on structure, sequence and function, the Ras superfamily is divided into five main families, (Ras, Rho, Ran, Rab and Arf GTPases). The Ras family itself is further divided into 6 subfamilies: Ras, Ral (Ral-A and Ral-B), Rit (Rit1 and Rit2), Rap, Rheb, and Rad. Miro is a recent contributor to the superfamily.

Each subfamily shares the common core G domain, which provides essential GTPase and nucleotide exchange activity.

The surrounding sequence helps determine the functional specificity of the small GTPase, for example the 'Insert Loop', common to the Rho subfamily, specifically contributes to binding to effector proteins such as IQGAP and WASP.

The Ras family is generally responsible for cell proliferation, Rho for cell morphology, Ran for nuclear transport and Rab and Arf for vesicle transport.

== See also ==
- GTP-binding protein regulators
