= Guanosine diphosphate =

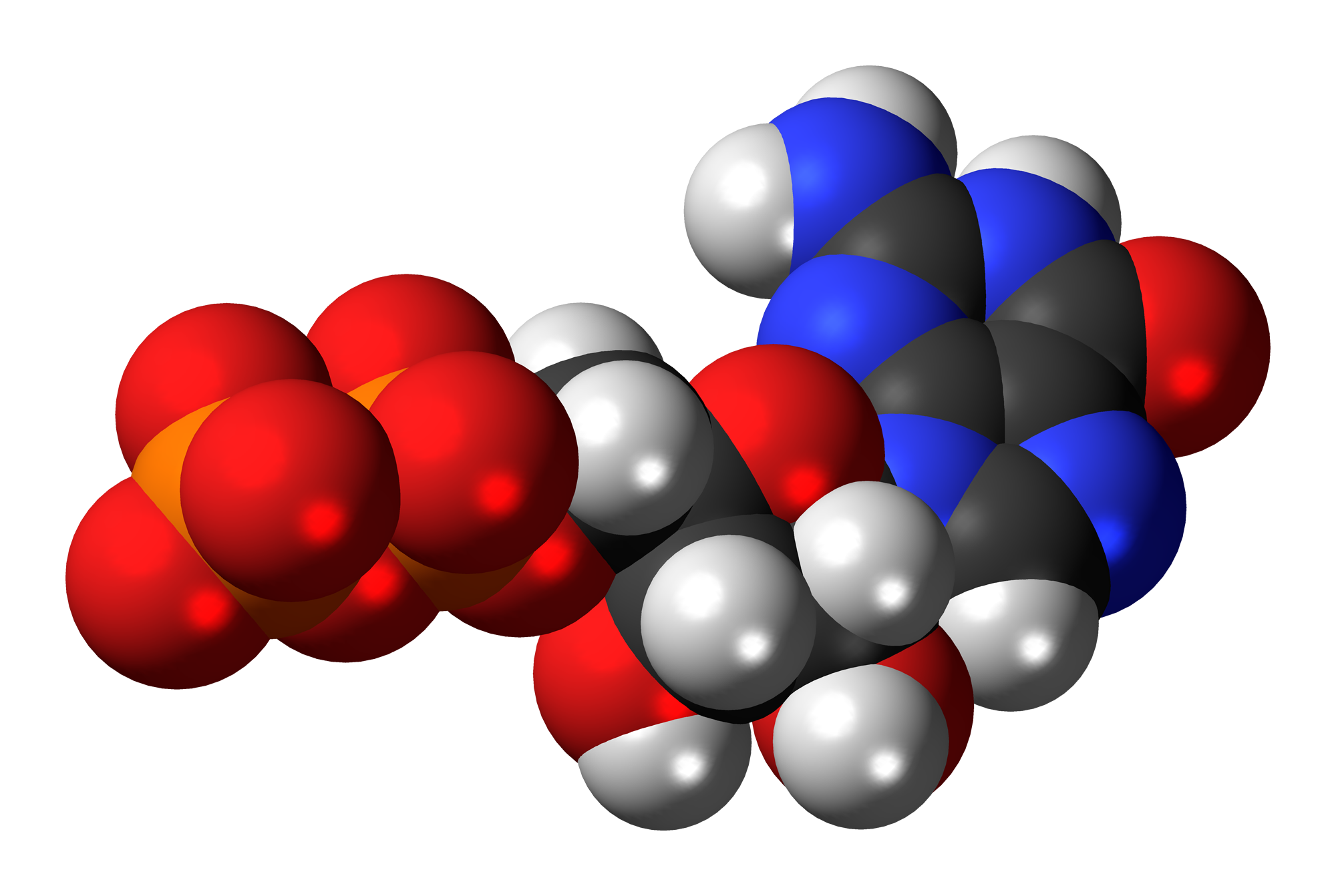

Identifiers
CAS Number	146-91-8
3D model (JSmol)	Interactive image
ChEBI	CHEBI:17552
ChEMBL	ChEMBL384759
ChemSpider	8630
IUPHAR/BPS	2410
PubChem CID	730
UNII	HLJ737P865
CompTox Dashboard (EPA)	DTXSID90163254
- InChI: InChI=1S/C10H15N5O11P2/c11-10-13-7-4(8(18)14-10)12-2-15(7)9-6(17)5(16)3(25-9)1-24-28(22,23)26-27(19,20)21/h2-3,5-6,9,16-17H,1H2,(H,22,23)(H2,19,20,21)(H3,11,13,14,18)/t3-,5-,6-,9-/m1/s1 Key: QGWNDRXFNXRZMB-UUOKFMHZSA-N
- SMILES: C1=NC2=C(N1C3C(C(C(O3)COP(=O)(O)OP(=O)(O)O)O)O)NC(=NC2=O)N

Properties
Chemical formula	C_{10}H_{15}N_{5}O_{11}P_{2}
Molar mass	443.200522
- Except where otherwise noted, data are given for materials in their standard state (at 25 °C [77 °F], 100 kPa). verify (what is ?) Infobox references

Guanosine diphosphate, abbreviated GDP, is a nucleoside diphosphate. It is an ester of pyrophosphoric acid with the nucleoside guanosine. GDP consists of a pyrophosphate group, a pentose sugar ribose, and the nucleobase guanine.

GDP is the product of GTP dephosphorylation by GTPases, e.g., the G-proteins that are involved in signal transduction.

GDP is converted into GTP with the help of pyruvate kinase and phosphoenolpyruvate.

== GDP and GTP ==
=== Hydrolysis of GTP into GDP ===
The hydrolysis of GTP to GDP is facilitated by GTPase enzymes, which utilize a conserved active site motif known as the GTPase-activating protein (GAP). Initially, a water molecule is coordinated by the active site residues of the GTPase enzyme. The water molecule attacks the γ-phosphate of GTP, leading to the formation of a pentavalent transition state. This transition state is stabilized by interactions with the active site residues, including conserved catalytic residues. As a result, the γ-phosphate is cleaved, and inorganic phosphate (Pi) is released. This step also causes a conformational change in the enzyme that promotes the release of GDP.

== Biochemical functions ==
=== Intracellular signaling ===
GDP is involved in intracellular signaling processes functioning as a critical regulator in the activity of GTPases. GTPases act as molecular switches, cycling between an active GTP-bound state and an inactive GDP-bound state. The interconversion between GDP and GTP is tightly controlled and serves as a molecular timer for signal transduction pathways. When an extracellular signal triggers the activation of a G-protein coupled receptor (GPCR), the associated G-protein exchanges its bound GDP for GTP, leading to a conformational change and activation of downstream signaling cascades. This activation can stimulate a variety of cellular responses, including modulation of gene expression, cytoskeletal rearrangements, and regulation of enzymatic activities. The hydrolysis of GTP to GDP by the GTPase activity of the G-protein restoring the inactive state, thus terminates the signaling event.

In a type of intracellular signaling referred to as the Nuclear Import process, cytosolic proteins like alpha and beta importins would bind the nuclear localization sequence that is located within the protein, to which this complex would bind to a nuclear pore complex that allows for translocation into the nucleus. RanGTPase would bind to the beta importin which removes it from the complex, followed by the removal of the alpha importin which is also bound to the RanGTPase. While bound to the RanGTPase, the importins leave the nucleus where the Ran is hydrolyzed, converting the bound GTP into GDP. Ran-GDP can return the nucleus through its bind to a nuclear transport factor, where a Guanine Nucleotide Exchange Factor Protein can come to catalyze the exchange of GTP for GDP. We also see GTP hydrolysis in situations with Ras proteins in which the same reaction occurs.

== See also ==
- DNA
- Guanosine triphosphate
- Nucleoside
- Nucleotide
- Oligonucleotide
- RNA
