= RhoG =

Protein-coding gene in the species Homo sapiens

RHOG

Identifiers
- Aliases: RHOG, ARHG, RhoG, ras homolog family member G
- External IDs: OMIM: 179505; MGI: 1928370; GeneCards: RHOG
Enzyme activity
EC #	BRENDA	ExPASy	KEGG	MetaCyc
3.6.5.2	↗	↗	↗	↗

Gene location (Human)
Chr.	Chromosome 11 (human)
Band	11p15.4	Start	3,826,978 bp
Band	11p15.4	End	3,840,959 bp

Gene location (Mouse)
Chr.	Chromosome 7 (mouse)
Band	7|7 E2	Start	101,888,330 bp
Band	7|7 E2	End	101,905,261 bp
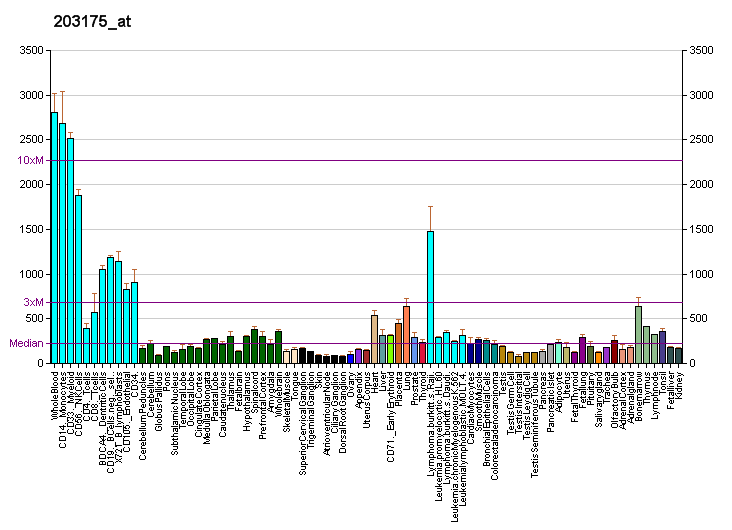
RNA expression pattern
Bgee	Human / Mouse (ortholog); Top expressed in: granulocyte; blood; monocyte; spleen; C1 segment; bone marrow; lymph node; olfactory bulb; bone marrow cell; right lung / Top expressed in: granulocyte; tibiofemoral joint; lip; bone marrow; stroma of bone marrow; thymus; yolk sac; blood; spleen; pyloric antrum; More reference expression data
BioGPS	More reference expression data
Gene ontology
Molecular function	nucleotide binding; GTP binding; protein binding; GTPase activity; protein kinase binding; phosphatidylinositol-4,5-bisphosphate 3-kinase activity
Cellular component	cytosol; endoplasmic reticulum membrane; membrane; focal adhesion; plasma membrane; extracellular exosome; secretory granule membrane; intracellular anatomical structure; cytoplasm; cell cortex; cell projection
Biological process	activation of GTPase activity; platelet activation; positive regulation of transcription, DNA-templated; Rho protein signal transduction; positive regulation of cell population proliferation; regulation of ruffle assembly; cell chemotaxis; Rac protein signal transduction; regulation of small GTPase mediated signal transduction; actin cytoskeleton organization; small GTPase mediated signal transduction; neutrophil degranulation; positive regulation of protein localization to plasma membrane; G protein-coupled receptor signaling pathway; actin filament organization; establishment or maintenance of cell polarity; regulation of cell shape; regulation of actin cytoskeleton organization; phosphatidylinositol phosphate biosynthetic process; positive regulation of protein kinase B signaling
Sources:Amigo / QuickGO
Orthologs
Databases	NCBI: entry; OMA: entry
Species	Human	Mouse
Entrez	391	56212
Ensembl	ENSG00000177105	ENSMUSG00000073982
UniProt	P84095	P84096
RefSeq (mRNA)	NM_001665	NM_019566
RefSeq (protein)	NP_001656	NP_062512
Location (UCSC)	Chr 11: 3.83 – 3.84 Mb	Chr 7: 101.89 – 101.91 Mb
PubMed search
- Wikidata
View/Edit Human	View/Edit Mouse

RhoG (Ras homology Growth-related) (or ARGH) is a small (~21 kDa) monomeric GTP-binding protein (G protein), and is an important component of many intracellular signalling pathways. It is a member of the Rac subfamily of the Rho family of small G proteins and is encoded by the gene RHOG.

== Discovery ==
RhoG was first identified as a coding sequence upregulated in hamster lung fibroblasts upon stimulation with serum. Expression of RhoG in mammals is widespread and studies of its function have been carried out in fibroblasts, leukocytes, neuronal cells, endothelial cells and HeLa cells. RhoG belongs to the Rac subgroup and emerged as a consequence of retroposition in early vertebrates. RhoG shares a subset of common binding partners with Rac, Cdc42 and RhoU/V members but a major specificity is its inability to bind to CRIB domain proteins such as PAKs.

== Function ==
Like most small G proteins RhoG is involved in a diverse set of cellular signalling mechanisms. In mammalian cells these include cell motility (through regulation of the actin cytoskeleton), gene transcription, endocytosis, neurite outgrowth, protection from anoikis and regulation of the neutrophil NADPH oxidase.

== Regulation of RhoG activity ==
As with all small G proteins RhoG is able to signal to downstream effectors when bound to GTP (Guanosine triphosphate) and unable to signal when bound to GDP (Guanosine diphosphate). Three classes of protein interact with RhoG to regulate GTP/GDP loading. The first are known as Guanine nucleotide exchange factors (GEFs) and these facilitate the exchange of GDP for GTP so as to promote subsequent RhoG-mediated signalling. The second class are known as GTPase activating proteins (GAPs) and these promote hydrolysis of GTP to GDP (via the intrinsic GTPase activity of the G protein) thus terminating RhoG-mediated signalling. A third group, known as Guanine nucleotide dissociation inhibitors (GDIs), inhibit dissociation of GDP and thus lock the G protein in its inactive state. GDIs can also sequester G proteins in the cytosol which also prevents their activation. The dynamic regulation of G protein signalling is necessarily complex and the 130 or more GEFs, GAPs and GDIs described thus far for the Rho family are considered to be the primary determinants of their spatiotemporal activity.

There are a number of GEFs reported to interact with RhoG, although in some cases the physiological significance of these interactions has yet to be proven. Well characterised examples include the dual specificity GEF TRIO which is able to promote nucleotide exchange on RhoG and Rac (via its GEFD1 domain) and also on RhoA via a separate GEF domain (GEFD2). Activation of RhoG by TRIO has been shown to promote NGF-induced neurite outgrowth in PC12 cells and phagocytosis of apoptotic cells in C. elegans. Another GEF, known as SGEF (Src homology 3 domain-containing Guanine nucleotide Exchange Factor), is thought to be RhoG-specific and has been reported to stimulate macropinocytosis (internalisation of extracellular fluid) in fibroblasts and apical cup assembly in endothelial cells (an important stage in leukocyte trans-endothelial migration). Other GEFs reported to interact with RhoG include Dbs, ECT2, VAV2 and VAV3.

There have been very few interactions reported between RhoG and negative regulators of G protein function. Examples include IQGAP2 and RhoGDI3.

== Signalling downstream of RhoG ==
Activated G proteins are able to couple to multiple downstream effectors and can therefore control a number of distinct signalling pathways (a characteristic known as pleiotropy). The extent to which RhoG regulates these pathways is poorly understood thus far, however, one specific pathway downstream of RhoG has received much attention and is therefore well characterised. This pathway involves RhoG-dependent activation of Rac via the DOCK (dedicator of cytokinesis)-family of GEFs. This family is divided into four subfamilies (A-D) and it is subfamilies A and B that are involved in the pathway described here. Dock180, the archetypal member of this family, is seen as an atypical GEF in that efficient GEF activity requires the presence of the DOCK-binding protein ELMO (engulfment and cell motility) which binds RhoG at its N-terminus. The proposed model for RhoG-dependent Rac activation involves recruitment of the ELMO/Dock180 complex to activated RhoG at the plasma membrane and this relocalisation, together with an ELMO-dependent conformational change in Dock180, is sufficient to promote GTP-loading of Rac. RhoG-mediated Rac signalling has been shown to promote neurite outgrowth and cell migration in mammalian cells as well as phagocytosis of apoptotic cells in C. elegans.

Other proteins known to bind RhoG in its GTP-bound state include the microtubule-associated protein kinectin, Phospholipase D1 and the MAP Kinase activator MLK3.

== Interactions ==
RhoG has been shown to interact with KTN1.
