= Ced-12 =

Protein-coding gene in the species Caenorhabditis elegans

Cell death abnormality gene 12

Identifiers
- Organism: Caenorhabditis elegans
- Symbol: CED-12
- Entrez: 172890
- Orthologs: NCBI: entry; OMA: entry
- RefSeq (mRNA): NM_060292.7
- RefSeq (Prot): NP_492693.1
- UniProt: Q8STE5

Other data
- Chromosome: I: 10.22 - 10.23 Mb
Search for
- Structures: Swiss-model
- Domains: InterPro

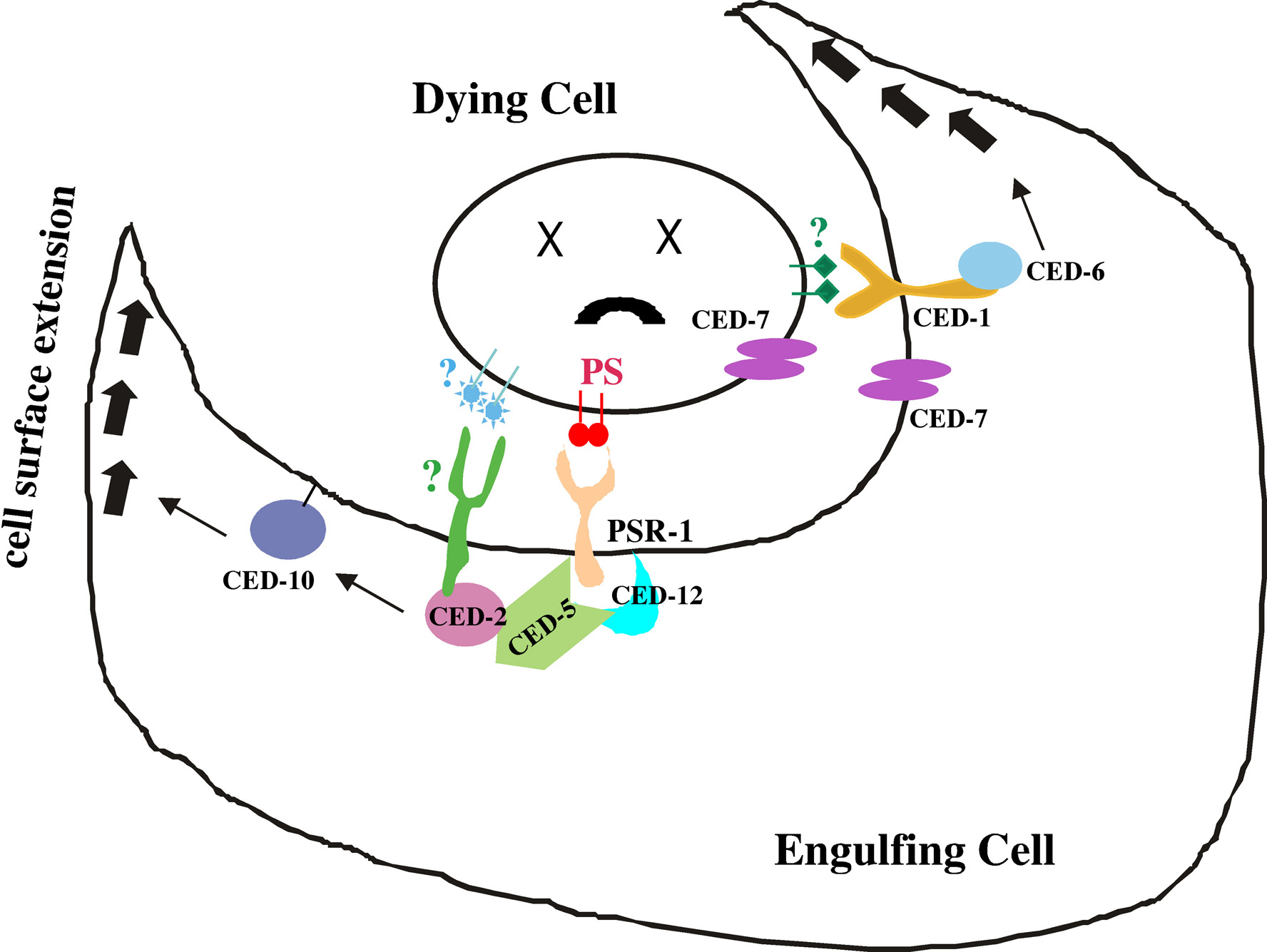
A cartoon drawing depicting the apoptotic phagocytosis process. The apoptotic cell releases signals which are recognized by a neighbouring cell. The cell recognizing the signal activates CED-12 (pictured as light blue half moon crescent), CED-2 and CED-5, which form a ternary structure that activates CED-10. CED-10 activates actin cytoskeleton remodelling, causing phagocytosis of the dying cell.

CED-12 (Cell Death Abnormality Protein-12) is a cytoplasmic, PH-domain containing adaptor protein found in Caenorhabditis elegans and Drosophila melanogaster. CED-12 is a homolog to the ELMO protein found in mammals. This protein is involved in Rac-GTPase activation, apoptotic cell phagocytosis, cell migration, and cytoskeletal rearrangements.

== Discovery ==
The discovery of CED-12 was done using knockout experiments. Its involvement in the apoptotic phagocytosis pathway was first noted when knocked-out ced-12 in C. elegans showed similar results in the apoptotic process to ced-5 and ced-2 knockouts. This lead researchers to believe, and later confirm, that the protein products of ced-12 (CED-12), ced-5 (CED-5), and ced-2 (CED-2) all functioned as part of the same pathway.

Researchers also noted direct protein-protein interactions between CED-12 and CED-10 (C. elegans homolog for Rac1), a Rac-GTPase (energy-dependent protein found used for cytoskeletal rearrangements among other functions). CED-10 was inactive when CED-12 was knocked-out. Expression of CED-12 with CED-5 and CED-2 activated CED-10, which lead to the activation of apoptotic phagocytosis.

== Function ==
CED-12 is an adaptor protein (proteins involved in facilitating the formation of signalling complexes) that is translated once apoptosis has been triggered in a cell. Apoptosis, also known as programmed cell death, activates during development as well as in situations where a cell has received sufficient physical damage. Many of the contents within a cell are reactive with the environment outside of the cell and must be disposed of without causing any harm to the surrounding tissues. Apoptotic cells are removed from their external environment by neighbouring cells that recognize cell-surface markers located on the apoptotic cell membrane. Marker recognition leads to the engulfment of apoptotic cells by phagocytosis. On a molecular level, recognition of the cell-surface markers leads to the translation of the CED-12 protein in the cytoplasm of the engulfing cell, which then gets localized to the cell membrane. CED-12 binds CED-2 (C. elegans homolog to CrkII in mammals), followed by CED-5 (C. elegans homolog for DOCK180 in mammals) and forms a ternary structure. Transmembrane CED-1 is an example of the cell-surface receptor on the engulfing cell. When receptors come in contact with cell surface markers on the apoptotic cell, a protein known as CED-6 (homolog for GULP in mammals) is expressed. Both the CED-2/CED-5/CED-12 ternary structure and CED-6 function to activate an effector protein known as CED-10. CED-10 is a RAC-GTPase protein that is directly responsible for the rearrangement of the actin cytoskeleton that initiates phagocytosis. This process is regulated by two pathways. The first is by CED-6, which is an adaptor protein that is responsible for coordinating protein-protein interactions between CED-10 and actin. The second pathway occurs when the CED-2/CED-5/CED-12 ternary structure form a GEF (guanine nucleotide exchange factor) with CED-10, which promotes the binding of a GTP energy molecule in order to activate the GTP-dependent CED-10.

CED-12 also functions in cell migration processes, which is regulated by the same interactions as the apoptotic phagocytosis pathway. It functions in distal tip cell migration in gonad development in C. elegans. Distal tip cells are somatic cells located at the tip of developing gonadal arms, and are responsible for the elongation of the gonadal arm as well as controlling mitotic and meiotic cell division of gonadal cells throughout development and adulthood. As C. elegans develops, the distal cells undergo a series of migrations in order to complete morphological changes, which define both gonad shape and size. This process occurs when integrins on the surface of the distal tip cells meet chemoattractants located on the extracellular matrix. The integrins form focal adhesions at the sites of the chemoattractants, which causes the localization of CED-5 to the adhesion points. CED-12 and CED-2 form the GEF-trio with CED-5 and activate the CED-10 Rac-GTPase in order to rearrange the actin cytoskeleton and promote the forward propagation of the distal tip cells.

== Gene and protein structure ==
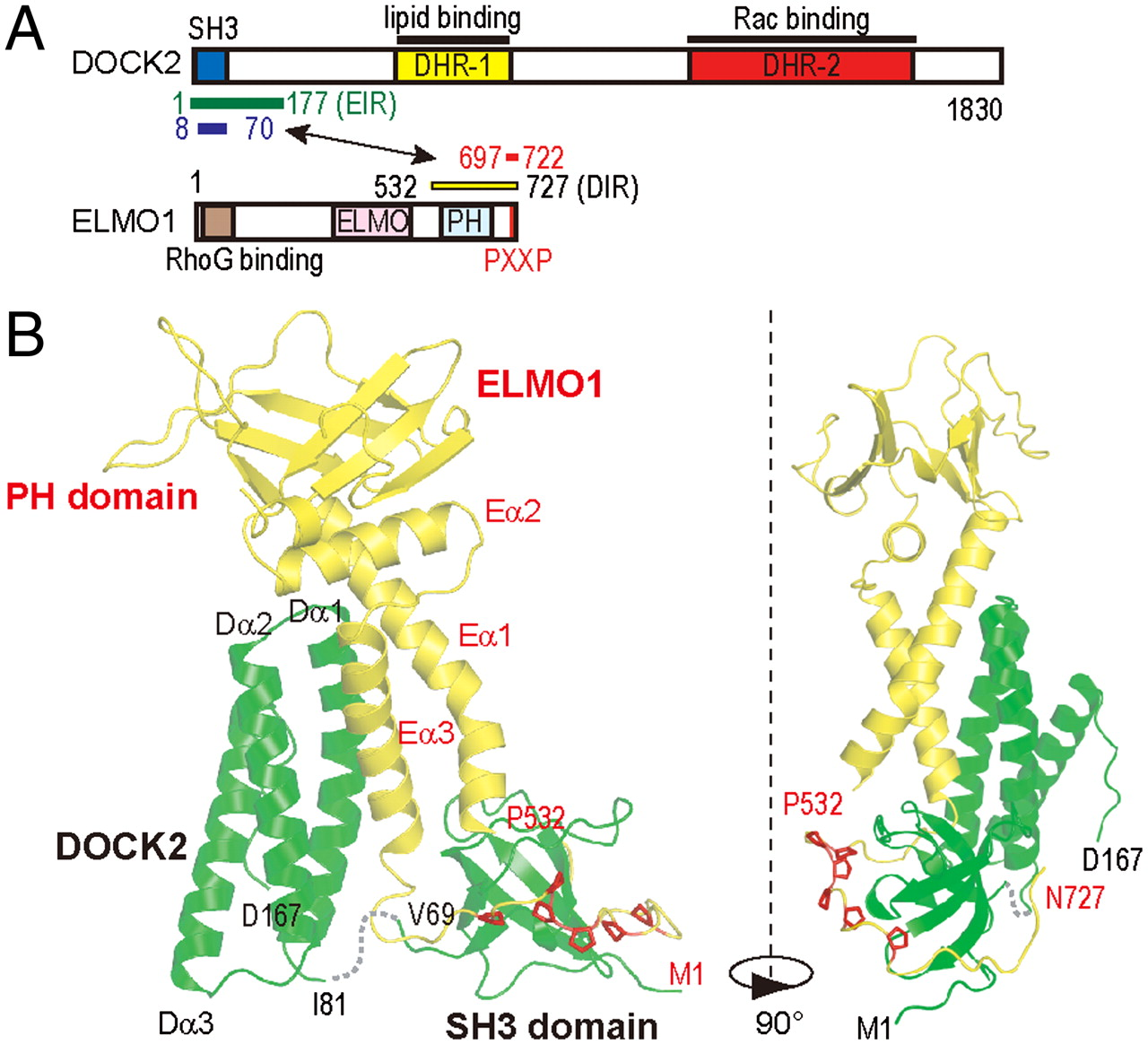
(A) A simplified graphical representation of the protein domains for DOCK2 (mammalian homolog to CED-5) and ELMO1 (mammalian homolog for CED-12). On DOCK2/CED-5, the SH3-domain that binds to ELMO1/CED-12 is shown as a blue rectangle. On ELMO1, Proline-Rich regions, indicated by PH, are in light-blue. These indicate the regions in which ELMO1/CED-12 and DOCK2/CED-5 interact when forming a complex. (B) A crystalline 3D-representation of the heterodimer structure between DOCK2/CED-5 and ELMO1/CED-12. On the right is the same crystalline structure rotated 90°. NOT SHOWN: CrkII/CED-2 in the ternary structure with DOCK2/CED-5 and ELMO1/CED-12

The ced-12 gene codes for an 82kDa large protein, which spans 731 amino acids in length. It is found on chromosome 2 on the L-arm in Drosophila, and on chromosome I in C. elegans. The protein structure of CED-12 is separated based on its binding domains:

- The proline-rich region on CED-12 is a binding site for the C-terminal SH3-binding domain on CED-5/DOCK180. The proline-rich region contains a high concentration of the amino acid Proline, and lies between amino acid residues 711-724. This domain is crucial in the remodelling processes of the cytoskeleton and follows a conserved sequence pattern composed of proline and arbitrary aliphatic (non-polar amino acids with open alkane side chains) residues. The conserved pattern of the sequence allows for hydrophobic and salt-bridge interactions with the SH3-domain.
- The repeating Armadillo (ARM) region on the N-terminal binds CED-2/CrkII, which is necessary to activate the heterodimerization with CED-5/DOCK180.
- The Pleckstrin Homology domain spans 100-200 amino acids in length. It is located close to the C-terminal and is necessary to bind the Rac-GTPase once the Guanine Nucleotide Exchange Factor with CED-5 and CED-2 is formed. This activates the cytoskeletal remodelling.

== Interactions ==
CED-12 has been shown to interact with:

- CED-5
- CED-2
- CED-10
