= Vav (protein) =

Proteins involved in cell signalling

Vav is a family of proteins involved in cell signalling. They act as guanine nucleotide exchange factors (GEFs) for small G proteins of the Rho family. GEF activity is mediated via module of tandem DH-PH domains. Vav proteins also appear to exhibit GEF-independent functions. Although it was originally thought that Vav proteins would only be present in multicellular organisms, Vav family proteins have been observed in Choanoflagellates.

== Function ==
Some functions of the Vav protein are important for the immune system. Specifically the ability of Vav to change the cytoskeletal structure of lymphocytes, which is particularly used to "aim" cytokines towards bound pathogens or cells.

In humans there are three Vav proteins:

- Vav1
- Vav2
- Vav3
