= ELMO3 =

InterPro Family

Identifiers
- Aliases: ELMO3, CED-12, CED12, ELMO-3, engulfment and cell motility 3
- External IDs: OMIM: 606422; MGI: 2679007; GeneCards: ELMO3

Gene location (Human)
Chr.	Chromosome 16 (human)
Band	16q22.1	Start	67,199,111 bp
Band	16q22.1	End	67,204,029 bp

Gene location (Mouse)
Chr.	Chromosome 8 (mouse)
Band	8|8 D3	Start	106,032,233 bp
Band	8|8 D3	End	106,037,392 bp
RNA expression pattern
Bgee	Human / Mouse (ortholog); Top expressed in: mucosa of transverse colon; body of pancreas; skin of abdomen; anterior pituitary; skin of leg; right uterine tube; right lobe of thyroid gland; left lobe of thyroid gland; minor salivary glands; body of stomach / Top expressed in: spermatocyte; intestinal villus; Ependyma of lateral ventricle; ileum; jejunum; duodenum; right kidney; colon; transitional epithelium of urinary bladder; parotid gland; More reference expression data
BioGPS	n/a
Gene ontology
Molecular function	SH3 domain binding; protein binding
Cellular component	cytoplasm
Biological process	cell migration; phagocytosis; apoptotic process
Sources:Amigo / QuickGO
Orthologs
Databases	NCBI: entry; OMA: entry
Species	Human	Mouse
Entrez	79767	234683
Ensembl	ENSG00000102890	ENSMUSG00000014791
UniProt	Q96BJ8	Q8BYZ7
RefSeq (mRNA)	NM_024712	NM_172760
RefSeq (protein)	NP_078988	NP_766348
Location (UCSC)	Chr 16: 67.2 – 67.2 Mb	Chr 8: 106.03 – 106.04 Mb
PubMed search
- Wikidata
View/Edit Human	View/Edit Mouse

Engulfment and cell motility 3, also known as ELMO3, is a human gene.

The protein encoded by this gene is similar to a C. elegans protein that functions in phagocytosis of apoptotic cells and in cell migration. Other members of this small family of engulfment and cell motility (ELMO) proteins have been shown to interact with the dedicator of cyto-kinesis 1 (DOCK1) protein to promote phagocytosis and effect cell shape changes.
