= VAV3 =

Protein-coding gene in humans

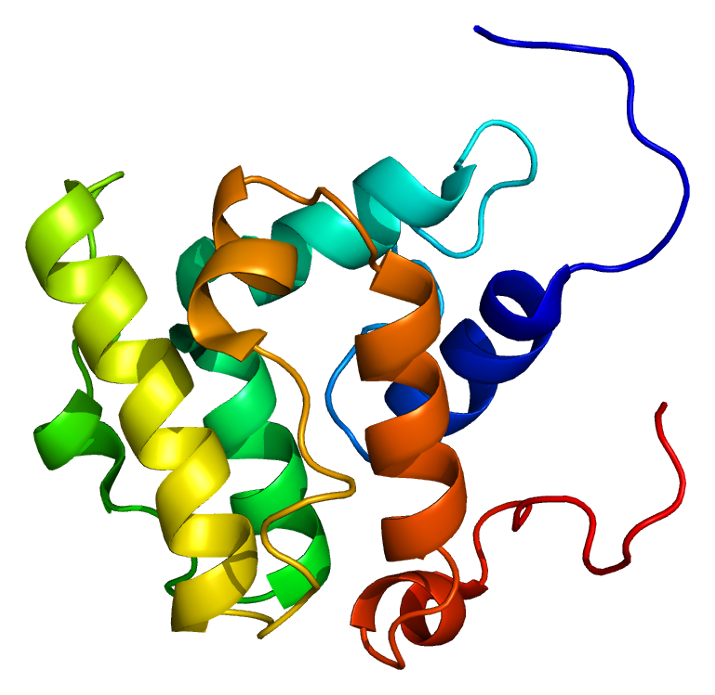

Identifiers
- Aliases: VAV3, vav guanine nucleotide exchange factor 3
- External IDs: OMIM: 605541; MGI: 1888518; GeneCards: VAV3
Available structures
PDB	Ortholog search: PDBe RCSB
PDB	List of PDB id codes 2D86

Gene location (Human)
Chr.	Chromosome 1 (human)
Band	1p13.3	Start	107,571,161 bp
Band	1p13.3	End	107,965,180 bp

Gene location (Mouse)
Chr.	Chromosome 3 (mouse)
Band	3|3 F3	Start	109,247,969 bp
Band	3|3 F3	End	109,593,014 bp
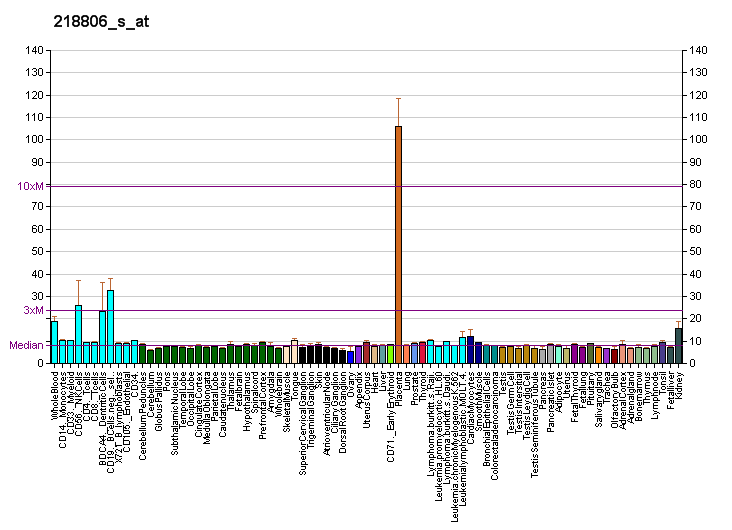

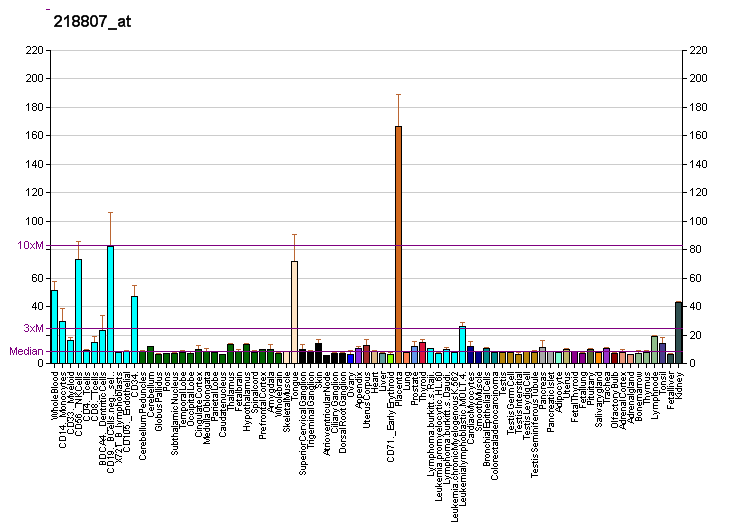
RNA expression pattern
Bgee	Human / Mouse (ortholog); Top expressed in: renal medulla; skin of thigh; gingival epithelium; skin of hip; secondary oocyte; kidney tubule; tibia; rectum; palpebral conjunctiva; hair follicle / Top expressed in: habenula; hair follicle; medullary collecting duct; medial dorsal nucleus; granulocyte; medial geniculate nucleus; spermatid; conjunctival fornix; Paneth cell; lateral geniculate nucleus; More reference expression data
BioGPS	More reference expression data
Gene ontology
Molecular function	protein binding; metal ion binding; epidermal growth factor receptor binding; GTPase activator activity; guanyl-nucleotide exchange factor activity
Cellular component	cytoplasm; cytosol; plasma membrane
Biological process	angiogenesis; Fc-gamma receptor signaling pathway involved in phagocytosis; intracellular signal transduction; ephrin receptor signaling pathway; lamellipodium assembly; regulation of Rho protein signal transduction; positive regulation of phosphatidylinositol 3-kinase activity; vascular endothelial growth factor receptor signaling pathway; small GTPase mediated signal transduction; B cell receptor signaling pathway; cell projection assembly; Fc-epsilon receptor signaling pathway; positive regulation of apoptotic process; integrin-mediated signaling pathway; cellular response to DNA damage stimulus; regulation of cell size; regulation of small GTPase mediated signal transduction; cell migration; platelet activation; vesicle fusion; positive regulation of cell adhesion; positive regulation of B cell proliferation; neutrophil chemotaxis; regulation of GTPase activity; positive regulation of signal transduction; positive regulation of GTPase activity; G protein-coupled receptor signaling pathway
Sources:Amigo / QuickGO
Orthologs
Databases	NCBI: entry; OMA: entry
Species	Human	Mouse
Entrez	10451	57257
Ensembl	ENSG00000134215	ENSMUSG00000033721
UniProt	Q9UKW4	Q9R0C8
RefSeq (mRNA)	NM_001079874; NM_006113	NM_020505; NM_146139; NM_001378987
RefSeq (protein)	NP_001073343; NP_006104	NP_065251; NP_666251; NP_001365916
Location (UCSC)	Chr 1: 107.57 – 107.97 Mb	Chr 3: 109.25 – 109.59 Mb
PubMed search
- Wikidata
View/Edit Human	View/Edit Mouse

Guanine nucleotide exchange factor VAV3 is a protein that in humans is encoded by the VAV3 gene.

This gene is a member of the VAV gene family. The VAV proteins are guanine nucleotide exchange factors (GEFs) for Rho family GTPases that activate pathways leading to actin cytoskeletal rearrangements and transcriptional alterations. This gene product acts as a GEF preferentially for RhoG, RhoA, and to a lesser extent, RAC1, and it associates maximally with the nucleotide-free states of these GTPases. Alternatively spliced transcript variants encoding different isoforms have been described for this gene.

== Interactions ==
VAV3 has been shown to interact with Grb2.

== See also ==
- Actin
- Cytoskeleton
- GTPase
