= HCK =

Protein-coding gene in humans

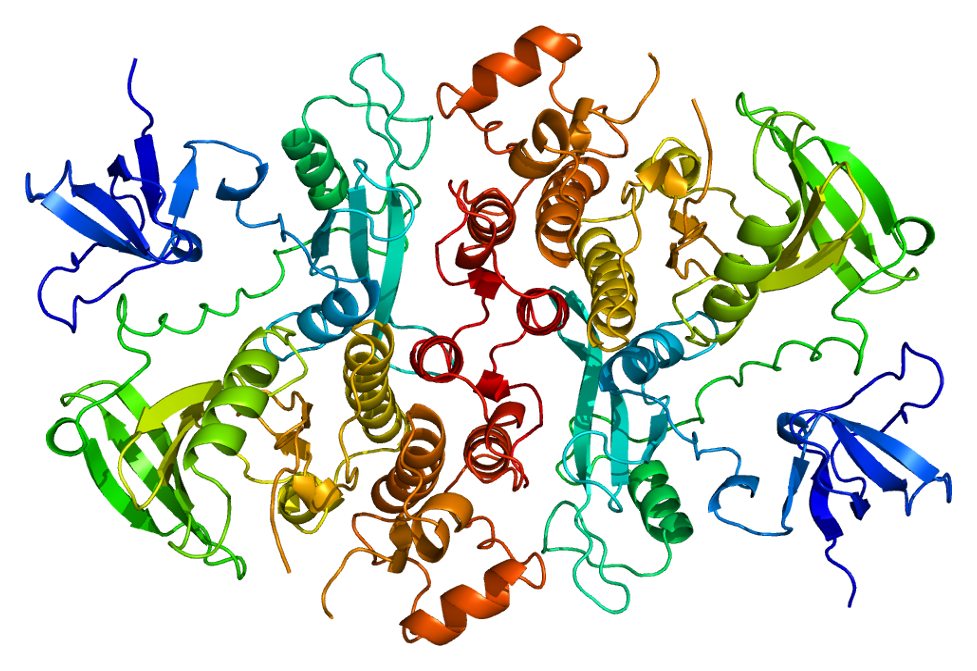

Identifiers
- Aliases: HCK, JTK9, p59Hck, p61Hck, HCK proto-oncogene, Src family tyrosine kinase
- External IDs: OMIM: 142370; MGI: 96052; GeneCards: HCK
Available structures
PDB	Ortholog search: PDBe RCSB
PDB	List of PDB id codes 1AD5, 1BU1, 1QCF, 2C0I, 2C0O, 2C0T, 2HCK, 2HK5, 2OI3, 2OJ2, 3HCK, 3NHN, 3RBB, 3REA, 3REB, 3VRY, 3VRZ, 3VS0, 3VS1, 3VS2, 3VS3, 3VS4, 3VS5, 3VS6, 3VS7, 4HCK, 4LUD, 4LUE, 4ORZ, 4U5W, 5HCK
Enzyme activity
EC #	BRENDA	ExPASy	KEGG	MetaCyc
2.7.10.2	↗	↗	↗	↗

Gene location (Human)
Chr.	Chromosome 20 (human)
Band	20q11.21	Start	32,052,197 bp
Band	20q11.21	End	32,101,856 bp

Gene location (Mouse)
Chr.	Chromosome 2 (mouse)
Band	2 H1|2 75.41 cM	Start	152,950,388 bp
Band	2 H1|2 75.41 cM	End	152,993,361 bp
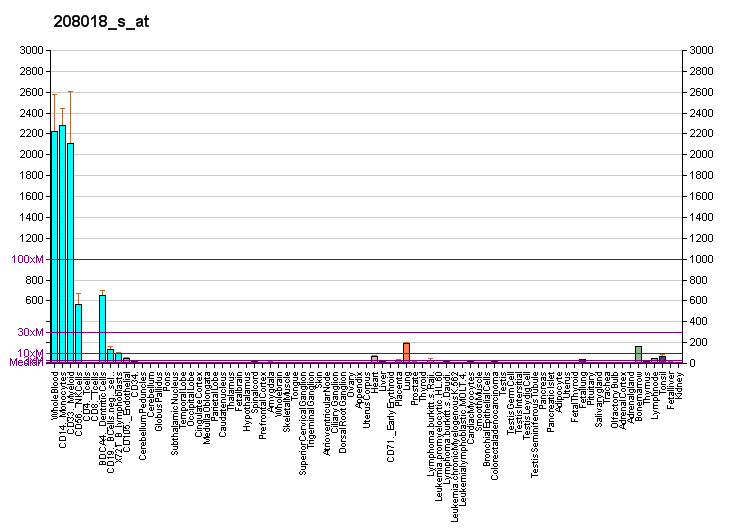
RNA expression pattern
Bgee	Human / Mouse (ortholog); Top expressed in: monocyte; granulocyte; blood; spleen; bone marrow; appendix; trabecular bone; middle frontal gyrus; bone marrow cell; periodontal fiber / Top expressed in: granulocyte; stroma of bone marrow; tibiofemoral joint; spleen; blood; rib; mesenteric lymph nodes; right lung lobe; transitional epithelium of urinary bladder; left lung; More reference expression data
BioGPS	More reference expression data
Gene ontology
Molecular function	transferase activity; nucleotide binding; protein kinase activity; non-membrane spanning protein tyrosine kinase activity; kinase activity; protein binding; signaling receptor binding; ATP binding; protein tyrosine kinase activity; phosphotyrosine residue binding
Cellular component	cytoplasm; cytosol; Golgi apparatus; cell projection; membrane; focal adhesion; extrinsic component of cytoplasmic side of plasma membrane; transport vesicle; cell junction; actin filament; caveola; lysosome; cytoskeleton; cytoplasmic vesicle; nucleus; nucleoplasm; plasma membrane
Biological process	cell differentiation; leukocyte migration involved in immune response; positive regulation of actin filament polymerization; Fc-gamma receptor signaling pathway involved in phagocytosis; phosphorylation; transmembrane receptor protein tyrosine kinase signaling pathway; cytokine-mediated signaling pathway; interferon-gamma-mediated signaling pathway; immune system process; leukocyte degranulation; negative regulation of apoptotic process; mitigation of host defenses by virus; protein phosphorylation; cell adhesion; respiratory burst after phagocytosis; regulation of DNA-binding transcription factor activity; positive regulation of cell population proliferation; regulation of inflammatory response; regulation of cell shape; regulation of podosome assembly; peptidyl-tyrosine autophosphorylation; phagocytosis; integrin-mediated signaling pathway; protein autophosphorylation; peptidyl-tyrosine phosphorylation; regulation of phagocytosis; mesoderm development; inflammatory response; innate immune response-activating signal transduction; positive regulation of actin cytoskeleton reorganization; lipopolysaccharide-mediated signaling pathway; exocytosis; viral process; innate immune response
Sources:Amigo / QuickGO
Orthologs
Databases	NCBI: entry; OMA: entry
Species	Human	Mouse
Entrez	3055	15162
Ensembl	ENSG00000101336	ENSMUSG00000003283
UniProt	P08631	P08103
RefSeq (mRNA)	NM_002110; NM_001172129; NM_001172130; NM_001172131; NM_001172132 NM_001172133	NM_001172117; NM_010407
RefSeq (protein)	NP_001165600; NP_001165601; NP_001165602; NP_001165603; NP_001165604 NP_002101	NP_001165588; NP_034537
Location (UCSC)	Chr 20: 32.05 – 32.1 Mb	Chr 2: 152.95 – 152.99 Mb
PubMed search
- Wikidata
View/Edit Human	View/Edit Mouse

Tyrosine-protein kinase HCK is an enzyme that in humans is encoded by the HCK gene.

== Structure ==
HCK comprises five distinct domains which include two terminal domains and three SH domains. The N-terminal domain is important for lipid modifications and a C-terminal domain includes a regulatory tyrosine residue. Next, HCK comprises three highly conserved SH domains: SH1, SH2, and SH3. The catalytic SH1 domain houses the kinase's active site. The regulatory SH3 and SH2 domains are tightly bound together when HCK is in an inactive state.

== Signaling ==
HCK is localized in the cytoplasm where it executes its functions as a kinase. In a steady state, HCK remains in an inactive conformation. Upon interaction with stimuli, such as TLR4 or IL-2, C-terminal tyrosine residues of HCK are dephosphorylated by phosphatases, e.g. CD45, and the inactive conformation of HCK is disrupted resulting in HCK activation. Activated HCK can then phosphorylate downstream molecules such as Bcr/Abl, PI3K/AKT, MAPK/ERK or STAT5 which then participate in myeloid cell polarization, proliferation and migration. A case study of a patient with a loss of C-terminal tyrosine residue in HCK showed that the patient suffered from severe pneumonia and vasculitis. This was due to increased HCK activity which led to increased myeloid cell migration and effector functions, such as the production of pro-inflammatory cytokines IL1b, IL-6, IL-8, and TNF-a, and the production of reactive oxygen species. These abnormal functions manifested as the infiltration of inflammatory leukocytes into the lungs and skin, resulting in pneumonia and vasculitis.

== Function ==
HCK plays a key role during inflammation as it participates in actin-dependent processes like phagocytosis, membrane remodeling, and cell migration. It has also been shown that HCK participates in NLRP3 inflammasome formation and LPS-induced inflammatory response in mice. However, the mechanism of action is yet to be elucidated. HCK not only participates in inflammation-associated processes but also in cancerous processes. It has been shown, that HCK is part of a CXCL12/CXCR4 signaling axis that is partially responsible for the migration of leukemic cells in the bone marrow of patients with acute myeloid leukemia. This finding proposes HCK to be a novel target for the treatment of acute myeloid leukemia. HCK and the Src family kinases have also been implicated in driving cell survival in drug-tolerant cancer cells.

== Interactions ==
HCK has been shown to interact with:

- ADAM15
- BCR gene,
- Cbl gene,
- ELMO1,
- Granulocyte colony-stimulating factor receptor,
- RAPGEF1,
- RAS p21 protein activator 1, and
- RASA3.
