= ELMO1 =

Protein-coding gene in the species Homo sapiens

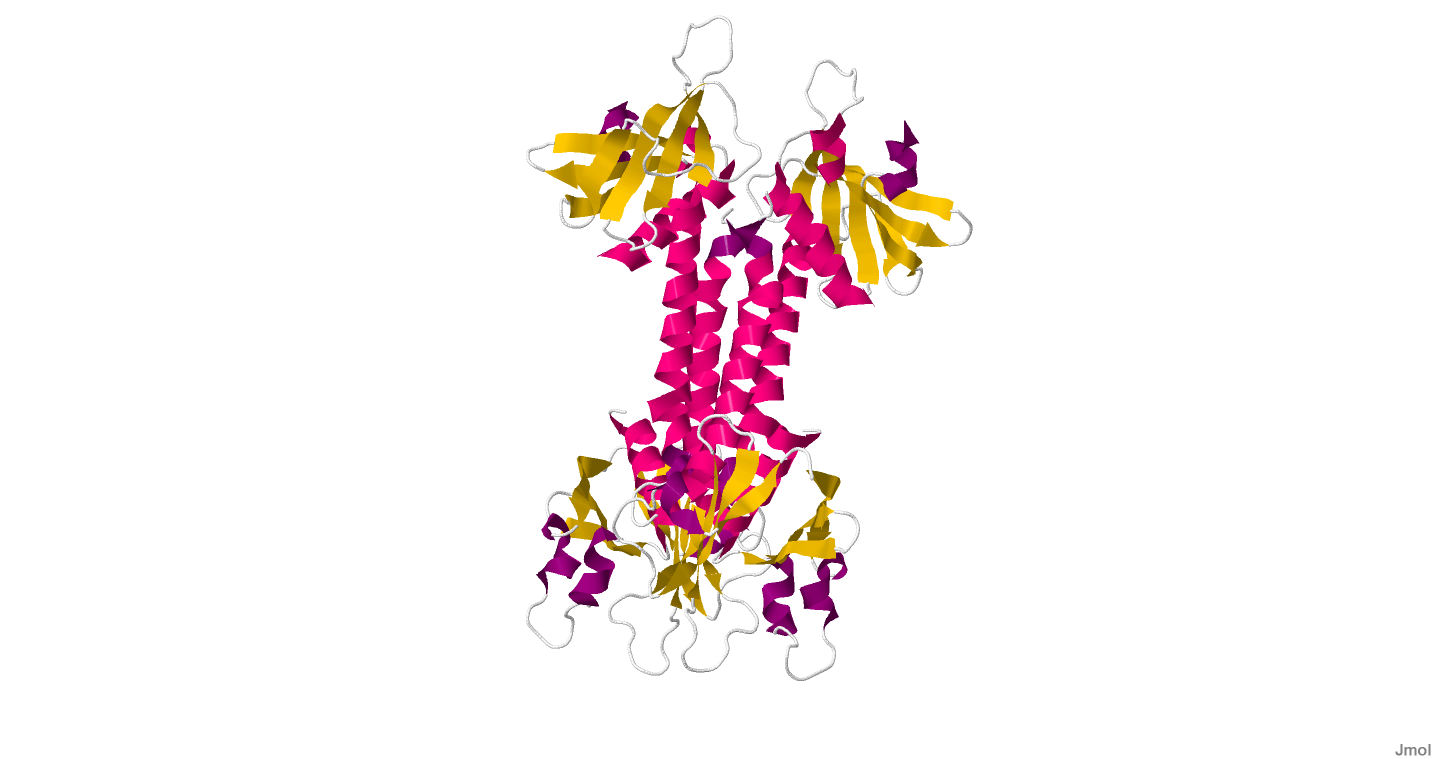

Identifiers
- Aliases: ELMO1, CED-12, CED12, ELMO-1, engulfment and cell motility 1
- External IDs: OMIM: 606420; MGI: 2153044; GeneCards: ELMO1
Available structures
PDB	Ortholog search: PDBe RCSB
PDB	List of PDB id codes 2RQR, 2VSZ, 3A98

Gene location (Human)
Chr.	Chromosome 7 (human)
Band	7p14.2-p14.1	Start	36,852,906 bp
Band	7p14.2-p14.1	End	37,449,223 bp

Gene location (Mouse)
Chr.	Chromosome 13 (mouse)
Band	13|13 A2	Start	20,274,766 bp
Band	13|13 A2	End	20,792,523 bp
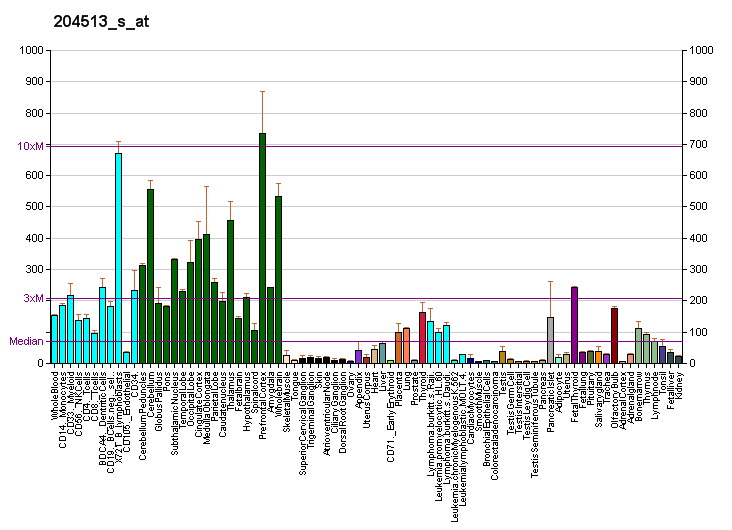
RNA expression pattern
Bgee	Human / Mouse (ortholog); Top expressed in: prefrontal cortex; C1 segment; corpus callosum; Brodmann area 9; sural nerve; right frontal lobe; islet of Langerhans; lateral nuclear group of thalamus; postcentral gyrus; ganglionic eminence / Top expressed in: medial dorsal nucleus; medial geniculate nucleus; lateral geniculate nucleus; pallidum of neuraxis; globus pallidus; pontine nuclei; deep cerebellar nuclei; inferior colliculi; granulocyte; cerebellar cortex; More reference expression data
BioGPS	More reference expression data
Gene ontology
Molecular function	guanyl-nucleotide exchange factor activity; SH3 domain binding; protein binding
Cellular component	cytosol; cytoplasm; guanyl-nucleotide exchange factor complex; plasma membrane; membrane
Biological process	Fc-gamma receptor signaling pathway involved in phagocytosis; actin filament-based process; mitigation of host defenses by virus; phagocytosis, engulfment; vascular endothelial growth factor receptor signaling pathway; phagocytosis; Rac protein signal transduction; cell migration; actin cytoskeleton organization; apoptotic process; cell motility; regulation of molecular function
Sources:Amigo / QuickGO
Orthologs
Databases	NCBI: entry; OMA: entry
Species	Human	Mouse
Entrez	9844	140580
Ensembl	ENSG00000155849	ENSMUSG00000041112
UniProt	Q92556	Q8BPU7
RefSeq (mRNA)	NM_001039459; NM_001206480; NM_001206482; NM_014800; NM_130442	NM_080288; NM_198093
RefSeq (protein)	NP_001034548; NP_001193409; NP_001193411; NP_055615; NP_569709	NP_525027; NP_932761
Location (UCSC)	Chr 7: 36.85 – 37.45 Mb	Chr 13: 20.27 – 20.79 Mb
PubMed search
- Wikidata
View/Edit Human	View/Edit Mouse

Engulfment and cell motility protein 1 is a protein that in humans is encoded by the ELMO1 gene. ELMO1 is located on chromosome number seven in humans and is located on chromosome number thirteen in mice.

== Structure ==
The human engulfment and cell motility protein 1, ELMO1, is 720 residues in length. The protein contains the following three domains:

- N-terminal Armadillo domain (residues 82-262)
- central ELMO (Engulfment and Cell Motility) domain (301-492)
- C-terminal pleckstrin homology domain (residues 527-674)

ELMO1 also has a pro-rich motif at the extreme C terminus. Secondary structure analysis has predicted that there are alpha-helical regions at both the N and C-terminus.

The structure of the pleckstrin homology domain of ELMO1 has been determine by X-ray crystallography.

== Function ==
The protein encoded by this gene interacts with the dedicator of cyto-kinesis 1 protein to promote phagocytosis and effect cell shape changes. Similarity to a C. elegans protein suggests that this protein may function in apoptosis and in cell migration. Alternative splicing of this gene results in multiple transcript variants encoding different isoforms.

== Interactions ==
ELMO1 has been shown to interact with Dock180 and HCK. ELMO1 directly interacts with the SH3 domain of HCK. The association between ELMO1 and HCK is dependent on polyproline interactions.

When ELMO1 is complexed with DOCK180, Rac GTPase-dependent biological processes are activated. The pH domain of ELMO1 functions in trans to stabilize DOCK180 and make it resistant to degradation. When ELMO1 binds to DOCK180 it relieves the steric inhibition of DOCK180 which then activates the Rac GTPase. The pro-rich motif of the C terminus on ELMO1 is essential for the binding of ELMO1 to the SH3 domain at the N terminus of DOCK180. The complex of ELMO1 and DOCK180 act as a regulator of Rac during development of a cell and cell migration. Mutation of both interaction sites for DOCK180 on ELMO1 will lead to the disruption of the ELMO1-DOCK180 complex. ELMO1 complexed with both DOCK180 and CrkII leads to maximal efficiency of phagocytosis in the cell. This complex of molecules happens upstream of Rac during phagocytosis.
