= DCrk =

Crk oncogene

Identifiers
- Organism: Drosophila melanogaster
- Symbol: Crk
- UniProt: Q95RW2
Search for
- Structures: Swiss-model
- Domains: InterPro

DCrk (Drosophila ortholog of Crk) is the Drosophila melanogaster ortholog of the mammalian proteins Crk and CrkL.

== Structure and function ==
DCrk includes one SH2 domain followed by two SH3 domains and interacts with the MyoBlast City (MCB) protein. The DCrk protein is expressed during embryogenesis, declines during the larval stages, and reappears during pupation which suggests that DCrk plays an important role in development.
