= KTN1 =

Protein-coding gene in the species Homo sapiens

Identifiers
- Aliases: KTN1, CG1, KNT, MU-RMS-40.19, kinectin 1
- External IDs: OMIM: 600381; MGI: 109153; HomoloGene: 135663; GeneCards: KTN1; OMA:KTN1 - orthologs

Gene location (Human)
Chr.	Chromosome 14 (human)
Band	14q22.3	Start	55,559,072 bp
Band	14q22.3	End	55,701,526 bp

Gene location (Mouse)
Chr.	Chromosome 14 (mouse)
Band	14|14 C1	Start	47,885,905 bp
Band	14|14 C1	End	47,977,351 bp
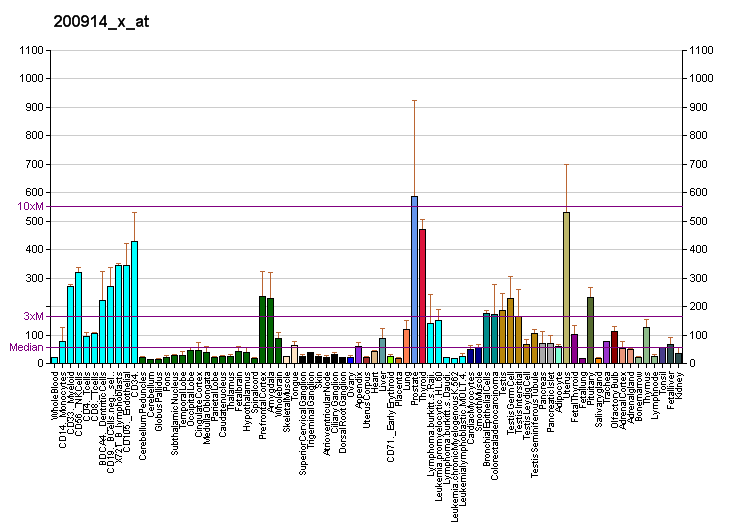

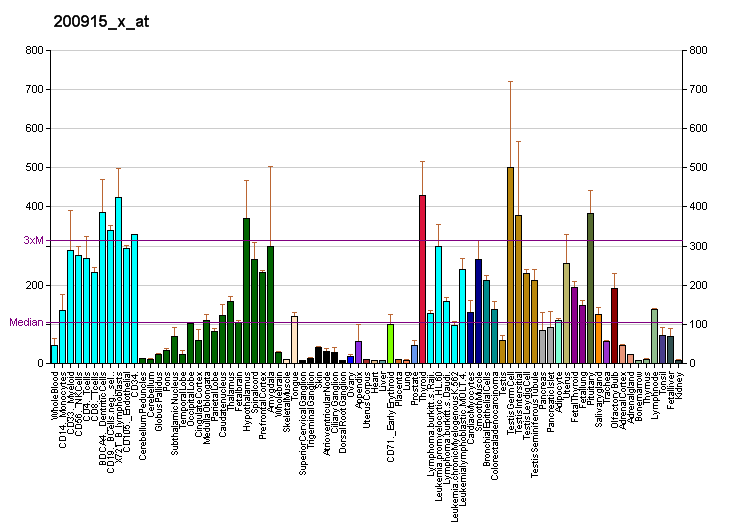

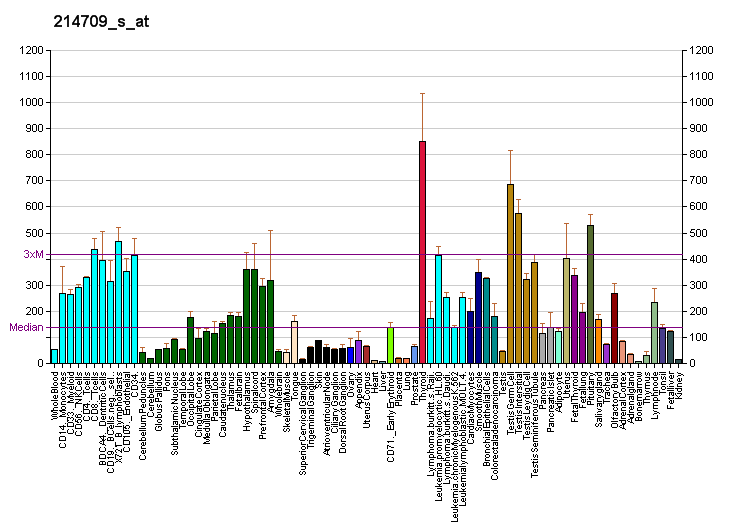
RNA expression pattern
Bgee	Human / Mouse (ortholog); Top expressed in: sperm; glutes; Skeletal muscle tissue of rectus abdominis; biceps brachii; Skeletal muscle tissue of biceps brachii; Epithelium of choroid plexus; renal medulla; mucosa of paranasal sinus; epithelium of colon; vastus lateralis muscle / Top expressed in: tail of embryo; triceps brachii muscle; temporal muscle; sternocleidomastoid muscle; genital tubercle; digastric muscle; epithelium of lens; muscle of thigh; neural layer of retina; right ventricle; More reference expression data
BioGPS	More reference expression data
Gene ontology
Molecular function	protein binding; kinesin binding; RNA binding; cadherin binding
Cellular component	integral component of membrane; integral component of plasma membrane; endoplasmic reticulum membrane; endoplasmic reticulum; membrane; endoplasmic reticulum lumen
Biological process	microtubule-based movement; post-translational protein modification
Sources:Amigo / QuickGO
Orthologs
Species	Human	Mouse
Entrez	3895	16709
Ensembl	ENSG00000126777	ENSMUSG00000021843
UniProt	Q86UP2	Q61595
RefSeq (mRNA)	NM_001079521; NM_001079522; NM_001271014; NM_004986; NM_182926	NM_001293635; NM_001293636; NM_008477; NM_001347519; NM_001347520 NM_001347521; NM_001347522; NM_001347523; NM_001347524; NM_001347525; NM_001347526; NM_001347527; NM_001347528; NM_001379486; NM_001379487; NM_001379488; NM_001379489; NM_001379490; NM_001379491; NM_001379492; NM_001379493; NM_001379494; NM_001379495
RefSeq (protein)	NP_001072989; NP_001072990; NP_001257943; NP_004977	NP_001280564; NP_001280565; NP_001334448; NP_001334449; NP_001334450 NP_001334451; NP_001334452; NP_001334453; NP_001334454; NP_001334455; NP_001334456; NP_001334457; NP_032503; NP_001366415; NP_001366416; NP_001366417; NP_001366418; NP_001366419; NP_001366420; NP_001366421; NP_001366422; NP_001366423; NP_001366424
Location (UCSC)	Chr 14: 55.56 – 55.7 Mb	Chr 14: 47.89 – 47.98 Mb
PubMed search
- Wikidata
View/Edit Human	View/Edit Mouse

Kinectin is a protein that in humans is encoded by the KTN1 gene.

== Function ==
Various cellular organelles and vesicles are transported along the microtubules in the cytoplasm. Likewise, membrane recycling of the endoplasmic reticulum (ER), Golgi assembly at the microtubule organizing center, and alignment of lysosomes along microtubules are all related processes. The transport of organelles requires a special class of microtubule-associated proteins (MAPs). One of these is the molecular motor kinesin (see MIM 148760 and MIM 600025), an ATPase that moves vesicles unidirectionally toward the plus end of the microtubule. Another such MAP is kinectin, a large integral ER membrane protein. Antibodies directed against kinectin have been shown to inhibit its binding to kinesin.[supplied by OMIM]

== Interactions ==
KTN1 has been shown to interact with EEF1D, RhoG and RHOA.
