= Myoblast city =

Identifiers
- Organism: Drosophila melanogaster
- Symbol: mbc
- Entrez: 42817
- RefSeq (mRNA): NM_057796.4
- RefSeq (Prot): NP_477144.1
- UniProt: Q9VCH4

Other data
- Chromosome: 3R: 23.78 - 23.8 Mb
Search for
- Structures: Swiss-model
- Domains: InterPro

Myoblast city (Mbc) is a guanine nucleotide exchange factor (GEF)–like protein in the fruit fly Drosophila melanogaster and is the ortholog of the mammalian Dock180 protein. Mbc activates the small GTPase Rac1 to regulate actin cytoskeleton remodeling during development. The gene was first identified through deletion mapping on the right arm of chromosome 3, where multiple lethal recessive alleles revealed its essential developmental role. Mbc is required for several morphogenetic processes, including myoblast fusion, dorsal closure, and axon guidance, and embryos lacking functional Mbc display severe defects in muscle formation and epithelial morphogenesis. Mutated mbc embryos exhibit defects particularly in dorsal closure, cytoskeletal organization, myogenesis, and neural development.

== Discovery ==
The Myoblast city locus was identified by deletion mapping; using this technique, researchers were able to isolate the location of the gene on the right arm of the third chromosome. During the process four recessive alleles of Mbc were found; mbc^{c1}, mbc^{c2}, mbc^{c3}, mbc^{s4}, all of which are lethal and the D. melanogaster embryos fail to hatch.

During the first 9–10 hours of development, embryos with the mutant Mbc alleles show the same myosin expression as wild-type embryos. However, at about the 11th hour, most myoblasts fail to fuse. As development progresses, some myoblasts show signs of fusion, such as elongation and having multiple nuclei; but some remain round. After 13–14 hours of development, most cells in mutant embryos that failed to fuse lose myosin expression.

Further genetic interactions studies with know fusion regulators placed Mbc downstream of cell adhesion cues but upstream of actin assembly factors. Complementation test confirmed that the lethal phenotypes arise specifically from loss of Mbc function rather than secondary mutation of nearby loci. Molecular cloning of Mbc later validated its identity as the fly homolog of Dock180, demonstrating strong evolutionary conservation.

== Gene ==
In Drosophila melanogaster, myoblast city (mbc) is a gene located on the right arm of chromosome 3 in the region 95A–95BC. The gene covers several tens of kilobases and produces multiple transcript variants (such as mbc-RA and mbc-RB) through alternative splicing. It is switched on in the embryo and is expressed in mesoderm-derived tissues and other epithelial tissues that undergo major shape changes during development.

== Structure ==
Myoblast city is a large cytoplasmic protein belonging to the conserved CED-5/Dock180 family of Rac guanine nucleotide exchange factors. Mbc contains two signature Dock homology regions, DHR-1 and DHR-2.

DHR-1- contributes to membrane association and phospholipid binding,

DHR-2- acts as the catalytic domain that activates Rac GTPases and drives actin cytoskeleton remodeling.

Mbc forms signaling complexes with several proteins, most notably the ELMO (CED-12) protein, creating an evolutionarily conserved ELMO–Dock complex that promotes Rac recruitment and activation at the plasma membrane. It also interacts with adaptor proteins like Crk and works directly with Rac1 to regulate cell migration, myoblast fusion, and morphogenesis. Homologous proteins are found across metazoans, with the mammalian ortholog Dock180/DOCK1 sharing similar domains and functions. Due to this strong conservation, Mbc serves as an important model for understanding Rac-dependent cytoskeletal regulation in both invertebrates and vertebrates.

== Expression pattern ==
Expression of Mbc begins early in the somatic mesoderm during the stages in which myoblast fusion occurs. As development progresses, expression appears in epithelial tissues while undergoing important morphogenetic events, such as the dorsal epidermis and tracheal epithelium. Mbc is also expressed in embryonic hemocyte, where it influences their migration patterns. Low-level expression persists even in certain larval tissues that undergo remodeling or cell migration.

== Muscle development ==
During embryonic muscle development, myoblasts undergo a highly regulated fusion process that forms multinucleated muscle fibers. This occurs through a series of steps, including recognition and adhesion between founder cells and fusion-competent myoblasts, formation of an actin-rich focus at the fusion site, pore formation, and cytoplasmic mixing.

In Drosophila embryonic muscle development, myoblast fusion occurs between two distinct cell types, founder cells and fusion-competent myoblasts (FCMs). Founder cells specify each muscle fiber's characteristics and initiate fusion, while FCMs adopt the founder cell's identity after fusing. Fusion is inherently asymmetric. The first fusion happens between one founder cell and a single FCM, then between the growing multinucleated muscle precursor and additional FCMs. Specific immunoglobulin superfamily (IgSF) proteins mediate cell recognition since founder cells require Kirre or Rst, while FCMs express Sns or Hbs. Their interactions ensure fusion occurs only between appropriate partners.

At fusion sites, dynamic F-actin foci form and disappear just before fusion. These structures depend on actin-polymerizing complexes such as SCAR, WASp, and Arp2/3. The surface receptors cluster into a ring-like adhesion structure around the actin core called the FuRMAS. Among intracellular regulators, the Mbc–Elmo complex, a conserved guanine nucleotide exchange factor (GEF), activates Rac1, a small GTPase essential for cytoskeletal remodeling. Although previously thought to function in both cell types, new findings show that Mbc is required only in FCMs, not founder cells. Active Rac1 and Mbc accumulate at the FCM–founder cell contact site, which correlates with actin enrichment. New findings also suggest that FCMs generate actin-rich protrusions that invade the founder cell prior to fusion. Mbc promotes the formation and organization of F-actin foci through Rac1 activation, making it essential for proper cytoskeletal rearrangement in FCMs. Mutant mbc embryos show a severe failure of myoblasts to fuse, leading to abnormal numbers of mononucleated cells and disrupted muscle patterning.

== Dorsal closure ==
Mutations in Mbc may cause dorsal closure defects, which are similar to those seen in Rac1 compromised embryos, but do not disrupt the Rac →dpp signaling pathway that drives leading-edge (LE) cell identity. However, some Mbc mutant embryos do show some mildly reduced dpp expression in LE cells which is most commonly displayed in normal dpp levels, as opposed to hep(JNK kinase) mutants, which completely lack LE dpp expression. These findings indicate to us that Mbc is not essential for JNK pathway activation during dorsal closure. Instead, Mbc most likely contributes to dorsal closure by regulating cytoskeletal organization (cell shape changes). Partial redundancy with Cdc42, can also activate JNK and may hide any JNK-related requirement for Mbc.

In mammalian cells, Rac- and Cdc42-mediated activation of the JNK pathway is distinct from the cytoskeletal rearrangements these GTPases induce. This indicates that the two functions are separable. To support this, mbc mutations in Drosophila do not markedly reduce app expression in leading-edge cells despite causing dorsal closure defects. This suggests that Mbc acts primarily in the cytoskeletal remodeling required for epithelial sheet movement rather than in JNK signaling. Supporting this idea, Mbc mutant embryos show to have altered LE cell morphology which includes the mislocalization of Fasciclin III to the dorsal side of LE cells and reduced levels of polymerized actin throughout the epidermis during dorsal closure.

== Axon guidance ==
Mbc also plays an important role in the development of the nervous system, particularly in axon guidance. As growing axons navigate towards their synaptic targets, their growth cones are constantly reorganizing the actin cytoskeleton in response to extracellular cues. Mbc functions as an important mediator in this process by promoting Rac1 activation downstream of several guidance receptors.

Through this process, Mbc helps regulate cone motility, filopodial dynamics and directional turning (including stalled or misrouted axons) and defects in midline crossing. These phenotypes mirror those observed in Rac1- compromised embryos and support the idea that Mbc provides an essential link between guidance cue detection and the cytoskeletal remodeling required for accurate axon navigation.

== Neural development ==
Beyond its role in axon guidance, Mbc is required for several additional aspects of neural development. In the embryonic nervous system, the loss of Mbc or mutations in Mbc lead to disruptions (and ultimately defects) in neuronal morphology, including impaired neurite initiation, reduced branching, and altered outgrowth. Because Rac1 activity influences processes such as growth cone dynamics, dendritic patterning, and (some) aspects of neuronal migration, deficient Mbc function disrupts multiple Rac-dependent processes. Some evidence also suggests that Mbc may indirectly play a role neuroblast behavior, where cytoskeleton regulation influences asymmetric cell division. All together, these observations position Mbc as an important regulator of the structural and functional maturation of the developing nervous system.

== Conservation and homologs ==
The signaling functions of Mbc are highly conserved across metazoans. Mbc is the Drosophila ortholog of the mammalian protein Dock180 (also known as DOCK1), the founding member of the DOCK family of guanine nucleotide exchange factors. Like Mbc, Dock180 contains the DHR-1 and DHR-2 domains characteristic of this protein family and forms a conserved signaling complex with ELMO proteins. This ELMO–Dock complex promotes Rac activation in organisms ranging from nematodes to mammals.

DOCK1 plays similar roles in vertebrate systems, including myoblast fusion, cell migration, and tissue morphogenesis. Its conservation highlights the fundamental importance of Rac-dependent cytoskeletal regulation in developmental processes such as muscle formation and neuronal guidance. Because of this, Drosophila Mbc serves as a valuable model for understanding Rac signaling pathways that operate in human cells.
