= Amoeboid movement =

Mode of locomotion in eukaryotic cells

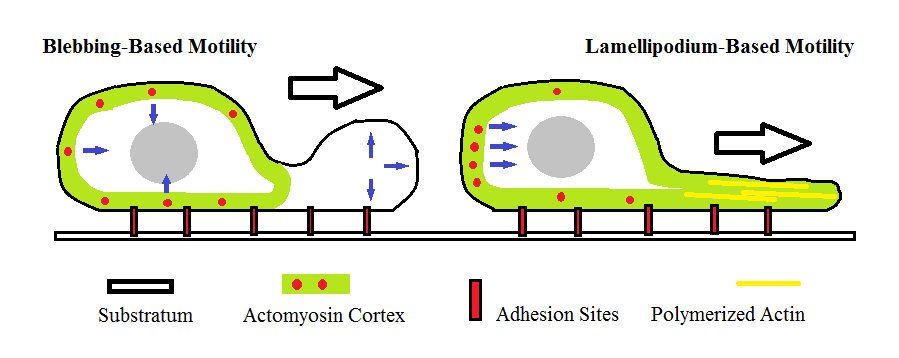
Two common modes of amoeboid motility

Amoeboid movement is the most typical mode of locomotion in adherent eukaryotic cells. It is a crawling-like type of movement accomplished by protrusion of cytoplasm of the cell involving the formation of pseudopodia ("false-feet") and posterior uropods. One or more pseudopodia may be produced at a time depending on the organism, but all amoeboid movement is characterized by the movement of organisms with an amorphous form that possess no set motility structures.

Movement occurs when the cytoplasm slides and forms a pseudopodium in front to pull the cell forward. Some examples of organisms that exhibit this type of locomotion are amoebae (such as Amoeba proteus and Naegleria gruberi,) and slime molds, as well as some cells in humans such as leukocytes. Sarcomas, or cancers arising from connective tissue cells, are particularly adept at amoeboid movement, thus leading to their high rate of metastasis.

This type of movement has been linked to changes in action potential. While several hypotheses have been proposed to explain the mechanism of amoeboid movement, its exact mechanisms are not yet well understood. Assembly and disassembly of actin filaments in cells may be important to the biochemical and biophysical mechanisms that contribute to different types of cellular movements in both striated muscle structures and nonmuscle cells. Polarity gives cells distinct leading and lagging edges through the shifting of proteins selectively to the poles, and may play an important role in eukaryotic chemotaxis.

== Types of amoeboid motion ==
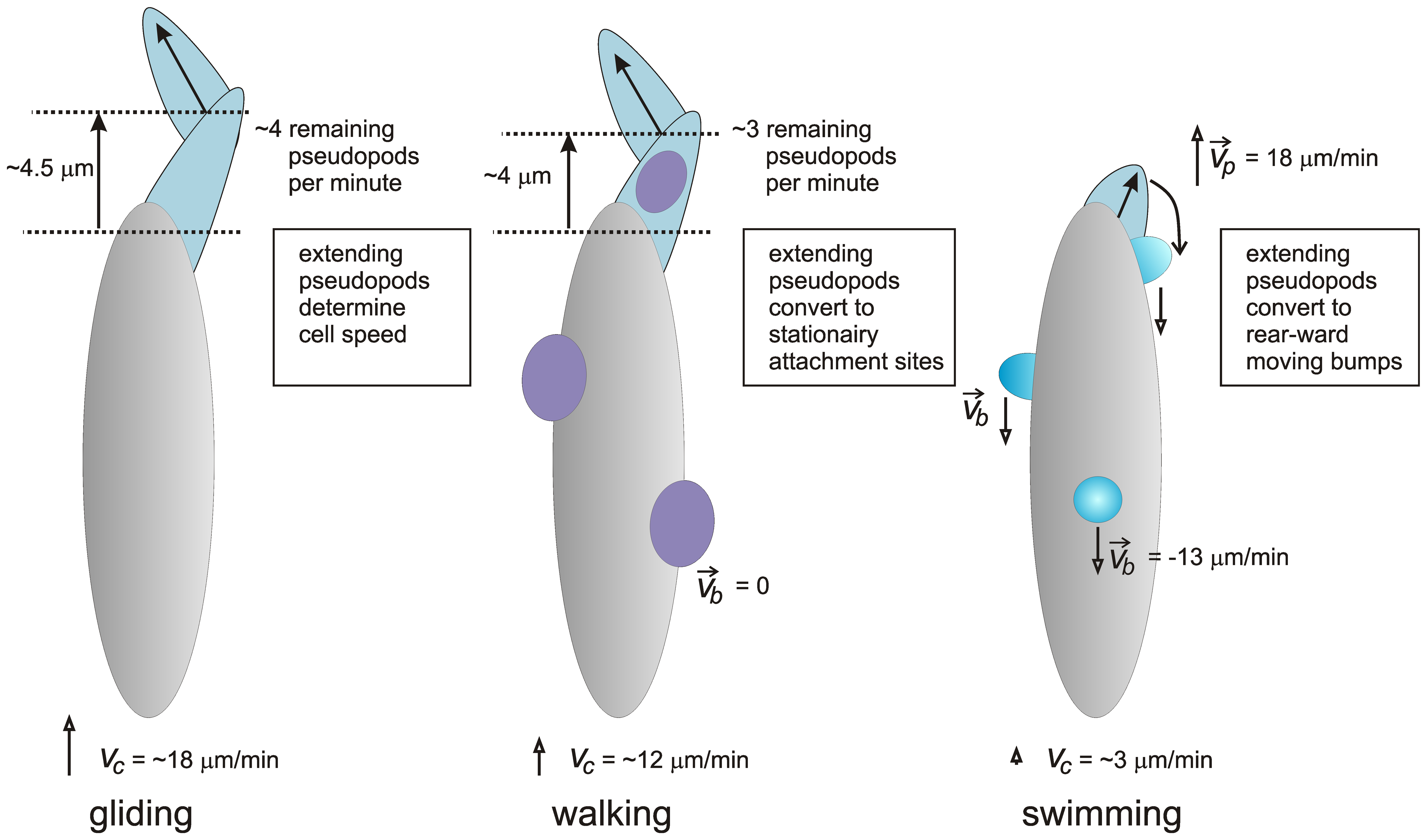
Diagram of the three main kinds of amoeboid cell movement

=== Crawling ===
Crawling is one form of amoeboid movement which starts when an extension of the moving cell (pseudopod) binds tightly to the surface. The main bulk of the cell pulls itself toward the bound patch. By repeating this process the cell can move until the first bound patch is at the very end of the cell, at which point it detaches. The speed at which cells crawl can vary greatly, but generally crawling is faster than swimming, but slower than gliding on a smooth surface. However, crawling does not become notably slower on uneven and irregular surfaces, while gliding becomes much slower under such conditions. It seems that crawling can be either bleb-driven or actin-driven (see sections below), depending on the nature of the surface.

=== Gliding ===
Gliding is similar to crawling, but is characterized by much less adhesion to the surface, making it faster on smoother surfaces which require less traction but slower on more difficult and complicated surfaces. Some cells glide with the same mechanism as crawling, but with larger pseudopods and less surface adhesion. Other cells use a different method to glide: a small patch of the cell already touching the surface binds to the surface, after which the cytoskeleton pushes or pulls on the anchored patch to slide the cell forward. This differs from the aforementioned mechanism in that the cell does not extend a pseudopod, so there is relatively little deformation of the cell as it progresses.

=== Swimming ===
Many different prokaryotic and eukaryotic cells can swim and many of these have either flagella or cilia for that purpose. These dedicated structures are not necessary for swimming, though, as there are amoeba and other eukaryotic cells which lack flagella and cilia but can still swim, although it is slower than crawling or gliding. There are two different proposed mechanisms for amoeboid swimming. In the first the cell extends small pseudopods which then move down the sides of the cell, acting like paddles. In the second the cell generates an internal flow cycle, with the cytoplasm flowing backward along the membrane edge and forward through the middle, generating a force on the membrane which moves the cell forward.

== Molecular mechanism of cell motion ==
=== Sol-gel theory ===
The protoplasm of an amoeba is made up of an outer layer termed the ectoplasm which surrounds an inner portion called the endoplasm. The ectoplasm consists of a gelatinous semisolid called plasma gel whereas the endoplasm is made up of a less viscous fluid called plasma sol. The ectoplasm owes its highly viscous state, in part, to the cross-linking actomyosin complex. Locomotion of an amoeba is thought to occur due to the sol-gel conversion of the protoplasm within its cell. 'Sol-gel conversion describes the contraction and relaxation events which are enforced by osmotic pressure and other ionic charges.'

For example, when an amoeba moves, it extends a gelatinous, cytosolic pseudopodium, which then results in the more fluid cytosol (plasma sol) flowing after the gelatinous portion (plasma gel) where it congeals at the end of the pseudopodium. This results in the extension of this appendage. On the opposite (posterior) end of the cell, plasma gel is then converted to plasma sol and streamed toward the advancing pseudopodium. As long as the cell has a way to grapple the substratum, repetition of this process guides the cell forward. Inside the amoeba, there are proteins that can be activated to convert the gel into the more liquid sol state.

Cytoplasm consist largely of actin and actin is regulated by actin-binding protein. Actin binding proteins are in turn regulated by calcium ions; hence, calcium ions are very important in the sol-gel conversion process.

=== Amoeboid movement modalities ===
==== Actin-driven motility ====
Based on some mathematical models, recent studies hypothesize a novel biological model for collective biomechanical and molecular mechanisms of cellular motion. It is proposed that microdomains weave the texture of cytoskeleton and their interactions mark the location for formation of new adhesion sites. According to this model, microdomain signaling dynamics organize the cytoskeleton and its interaction with the substratum. As microdomains trigger and maintain active polymerization of actin filaments, their propagation and zigzagging motion on the membrane generate a highly interlinked network of curved or linear filaments oriented at a wide spectrum of angles to the cell boundary. It has also been proposed that microdomain interaction marks the formation of new focal adhesion sites at the cell periphery. The interaction of myosin with the actin network then generates membrane retraction/ruffling, retrograde flow, and contractile forces for forward motion. Finally, continuous application of stress on the old focal adhesion sites could result in the calcium-induced activation of calpain, and consequently the detachment of focal adhesions which completes the cycle.

In addition to actin polymerization, microtubules may also play an important role in cell migration where the formation of lamellipodia is involved. One experiment showed that although microtubules are not required for actin polymerization to create lamellipodial extensions, they are needed in order to afford cellular movement.

==== Bleb-driven motility ====
Another such proposed mechanism, the 'bleb-driven amoeboid locomotion' mechanism, suggests that the cell cortex actomyosin contracts to increase hydrostatic pressure inside the cell. Blebbing occurs in amoeboid cells when there is a roughly spherical protrusion in the cell membrane characterized by detachment from the actomyosin cortex. This mode of amoeboid movement requires that myosin II play a role in generating the hydrostatic pressure that causes the bleb to extend. This is different from actin-driven locomotion where the protrusion created is by the actin polymerizing while remaining attached to the actomyosin cortex and physically pushing against the cell's barrier. During the bleb-driven amoeboid movement, the cytoplasmic sol-gel state is regulated.

Blebbing can also be a sign of when a cell is undergoing apoptosis.

It has also been observed that the blebs formed by motile cells undergo a roughly uniform life cycle that lasts approximately one minute. This includes a phase involving the initial outward expansion where the membrane breaks away from the membranous cytoskeleton. This is then followed by a short static phase where the hydrostatic pressure that has built up is just enough to maintain the size of the bleb. Following this is the last phase characterized by the bleb slowly retracting and the membrane being reintroduced to the cytoskeleton infrastructure.

Cells may undergo fast transitions between blebbing and lamellipodium-based motility as a means of migration. However, the rate at which these transitions are made is still unknown. Tumor cells may also exhibit rapid transitions between amoeboid motility and mesenchymal motility, another form of cellular movement.

=== Related movement mechanisms ===
Dictyostelium cells and neutrophils can also swim, using a similar mechanism as for crawling.

Another unicellular form of movement shown in Euglena is known as metaboly. The basis of sol gel theory is interconversion of sol and gel.

== See also ==
- Cytoplasmic streaming
- Pseudopodium
- Amoeba
