= Uropod (immunology) =

Uropods, in immunology, refer to the hind part of polarized cells during cell migration that stabilize and move the cell. Polarized leukocytes move using amoeboid cell migration mechanisms, with a small leading edge, main cell body, and posterior uropod protrusion. Cytoskeleton contraction and extension, controlled by various polarized signals, helps propel the cell body forward. Leukocyte polarization is an important requirement for migration, activation and apoptosis in the adaptive and innate immune systems; most leukocytes, including monocytes, granulocytes, and T and B lymphocytes migrate to and from primary and secondary lymphoid organs to tissues to initiate immune responses to pathogens.

== Role in amoeboid cell migration ==
Amoeboid cell migration mechanisms enable rapid movement without strong adhesion to tissue and that doesn't harm cell tissues, as opposed to other types of cell migration. The cell is also able to interact and integrate environmental signals so it can quickly find and follow chemical signals left by other cells or pathogens. Amoeboid movement generally consists of four main stages of movement:

1. The leading edge protrudes via changes in the actin cytoskeleton, sometimes with protrusions called pseudopods
2. Membrane and surface receptors interact with the substrate (usually other cells)
3. Actomyosin mediates contraction of the cell body
4. The cell body is pushed forward and adhesion forces in the rear uropod release

In more detail, after receptors on the cell recognize extracellular signals, cell contents are polarized to create different front and rear environments. Already, adhesion forces between the substrate and cell are present in the form of integrin/ICAM binding between cells. The uropod protrusion extends from the cell body due to actin polymerization and actomyosin extension, as cellular signals interact with cell and membrane contents. Actomyosin contraction pushes the cell forward by squeezing the cell contents in the direction of cell movement, prompting release of adhesion forces between the cell and environment and resulting in an overall change in position towards the extracellular signals.

These cyclic steps ensure fast movement towards a specific stimulus, such as pathogenic proteins or other signals.

== Mechanism ==
The uropod protrudes backward from the nucleus and main cell body and contains specific organelles, densely packed adhesion and signaling proteins, and cytoskeletal proteins. Several cell organelles are present in the rear of the cell to aid in quick and efficient movement, including the microtubule-organizing center, the golgi apparatus, and the endoplasmic reticulum. Mitochondria also localize near the uropod to efficiently deliver ATP to ATP-dependent actomyosin contraction. This redistribution of cell contents towards polarized structures is also important for cell activation, cell communication, and apoptosis, and thus uropod formation plays a crucial part in these functions.

Though research is ongoing, many cell signals and mechanisms are known to play a part in uropod formation and retraction. In leukocytes, polarized RhoA signaling regulates uropod formation and retraction, in comparison with CDC42 signaling in the leading edge pseudopods. These enzymes, both in the Rho family, interact with other factors such as GEFs, GAPs, myosin II and Rac proteins to control front and rear cytoskeletal elements and create the cycle of movement important to cell movement. Cyclic GMP and AMP have been shown to affect uropod formation, and are generally important for cell polarization and chemotaxis. Uropod membranes generally have high density of CD43 and CD44 and adhesion receptors (ICAM-1, ICAM-3, B1 integrins, and ERM adaptor proteins). These receptors mediate cell-matrix and cell-cell interactions during migration and have an anchoring function, which serves to steady the leukocyte and interact with tissue cells. Lipid rafts segregated to the uropod and leading edge are also known to aid actomyosin activity.
