= DGKQ =

Protein-coding gene in humans

Identifiers
- Aliases: DGKQ, DAGK, DAGK4, DAGK7, diacylglycerol kinase theta
- External IDs: OMIM: 601207; MGI: 102918; GeneCards: DGKQ
Enzyme activity
EC #	BRENDA	ExPASy	KEGG	MetaCyc
2.7.1.93	↗	↗	↗	↗
2.7.1.107	↗	↗	↗	↗

Gene location (Human)
Chr.	Chromosome 4 (human)
Band	4p16.3	Start	958,887 bp
Band	4p16.3	End	986,895 bp

Gene location (Mouse)
Chr.	Chromosome 5 (mouse)
Band	5 F|5 53.24 cM	Start	108,794,559 bp
Band	5 F|5 53.24 cM	End	108,817,538 bp
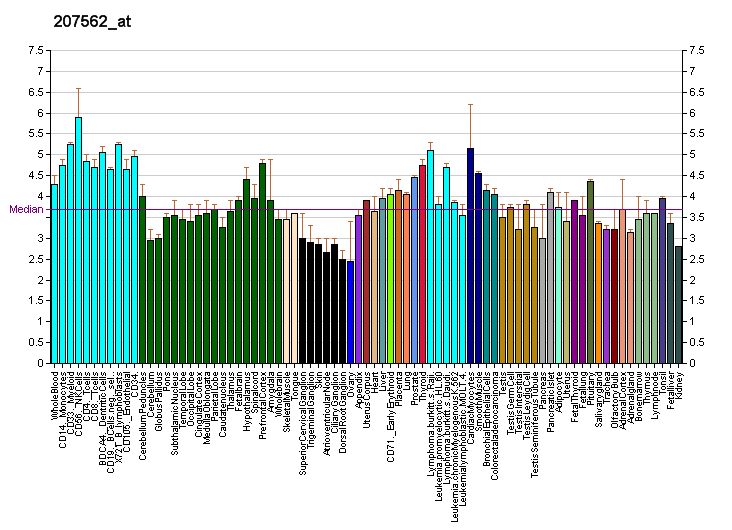
RNA expression pattern
Bgee	Human / Mouse (ortholog); Top expressed in: mucosa of ileum; pancreatic ductal cell; granulocyte; jejunal mucosa; mucosa of transverse colon; right hemisphere of cerebellum; middle temporal gyrus; duodenum; mucosa of sigmoid colon; thymus / Top expressed in: primary visual cortex; superior frontal gyrus; cerebellar cortex; dentate gyrus of hippocampal formation granule cell; right kidney; lip; genital tubercle; neural layer of retina; jejunum; granulocyte; More reference expression data
BioGPS	More reference expression data
Gene ontology
Molecular function	transferase activity; nucleotide binding; phospholipase binding; metal ion binding; kinase activity; kinase binding; protein binding; ATP binding; diacylglycerol kinase activity; transmembrane receptor protein tyrosine kinase activator activity; NAD+ kinase activity
Cellular component	cytoplasm; cytosol; nuclear speck; membrane; plasma membrane; cytoskeleton; nucleus; endosome; vesicle membrane; nuclear matrix; presynapse; postsynapse; glutamatergic synapse
Biological process	G protein-coupled receptor signaling pathway; thrombin-activated receptor signaling pathway; response to ATP; intracellular signal transduction; phosphorylation; regulation of transcription by RNA polymerase II; protein kinase C signaling; platelet activation; protein kinase C-activating G protein-coupled receptor signaling pathway; signal transduction; glycerolipid metabolic process; diacylglycerol metabolic process; lipid phosphorylation; regulation of gluconeogenesis; phosphatidic acid biosynthetic process; activation of transmembrane receptor protein tyrosine kinase activity; regulation of G protein-coupled receptor signaling pathway; positive regulation of gene expression; negative regulation of gene expression; negative regulation of peptidyl-threonine phosphorylation; peptidyl-serine phosphorylation; cAMP-mediated signaling; positive regulation of peptidyl-tyrosine phosphorylation; response to cAMP; regulation of cholesterol metabolic process; regulation of TORC1 signaling; regulation of cortisol biosynthetic process; regulation of progesterone biosynthetic process; metabolism; regulation of synaptic vesicle endocytosis
Sources:Amigo / QuickGO
Orthologs
Databases	NCBI: entry; OMA: entry
Species	Human	Mouse
Entrez	1609	110524
Ensembl	ENSG00000145214	ENSMUSG00000004815
UniProt	P52824	Q6P5E8
RefSeq (mRNA)	NM_001347	NM_199011; NM_001357029
RefSeq (protein)	NP_001338	NP_950176; NP_001343958
Location (UCSC)	Chr 4: 0.96 – 0.99 Mb	Chr 5: 108.79 – 108.82 Mb
PubMed search
- Wikidata
View/Edit Human	View/Edit Mouse

Diacylglycerol kinase theta is an enzyme that in humans is encoded by the DGKQ gene.

The protein encoded by this gene contains three cysteine-rich domains, a proline-rich region, and a pleckstrin homology domain with an overlapping Ras-associating domain. It is localized in the speckle domains of the nucleus, and mediates the regeneration of phosphatidylinositol (PI) from diacylglycerol in the PI-cycle during cell signal transduction.

== Interactions ==
DGKQ has been shown to interact with RHOA.
