= RASA3 =

Protein-coding gene in the species Homo sapiens

Identifiers
- Aliases: RASA3, GAP1IP4BP, GAPIII, RAS p21 protein activator 3
- External IDs: OMIM: 605182; MGI: 1197013; GeneCards: RASA3

Gene location (Human)
Chr.	Chromosome 13 (human)
Band	13q34	Start	113,977,783 bp
Band	13q34	End	114,132,623 bp

Gene location (Mouse)
Chr.	Chromosome 8 (mouse)
Band	8 A1.1|8 6.29 cM	Start	13,616,948 bp
Band	8 A1.1|8 6.29 cM	End	13,727,603 bp
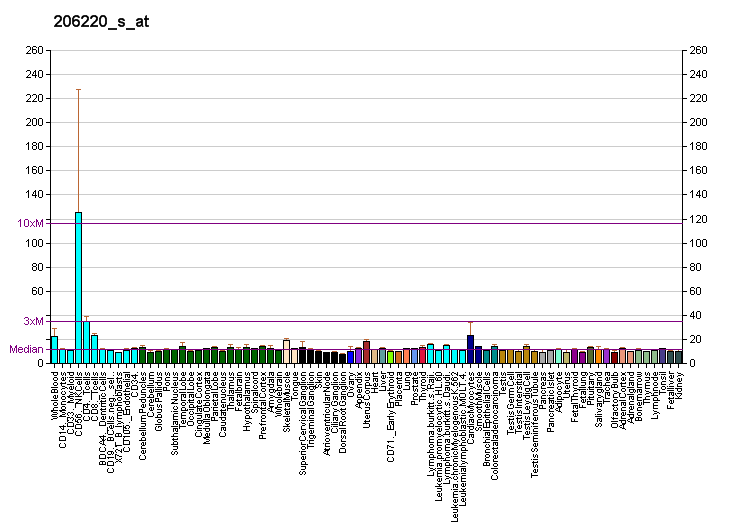

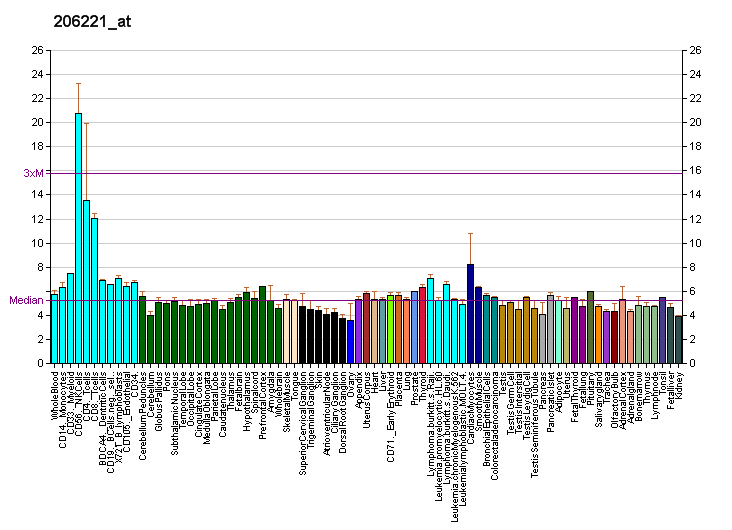
RNA expression pattern
Bgee	Human / Mouse (ortholog); Top expressed in: granulocyte; stromal cell of endometrium; sural nerve; monocyte; blood; subcutaneous adipose tissue; lymph node; right uterine tube; canal of the cervix; appendix / Top expressed in: mesenteric lymph nodes; blood; stroma of bone marrow; granulocyte; spleen; tibiofemoral joint; calvaria; subcutaneous adipose tissue; white adipose tissue; cerebellum; More reference expression data
BioGPS	More reference expression data
Gene ontology
Molecular function	calcium-release channel activity; metal ion binding; GTPase activator activity
Cellular component	cytoplasm; cytosol; membrane; intrinsic component of the cytoplasmic side of the plasma membrane; plasma membrane
Biological process	intracellular signal transduction; regulation of GTPase activity; MAPK cascade; signal transduction; positive regulation of GTPase activity; release of sequestered calcium ion into cytosol; negative regulation of Ras protein signal transduction
Sources:Amigo / QuickGO
Orthologs
Databases	NCBI: entry; OMA: entry
Species	Human	Mouse
Entrez	22821	19414
Ensembl	ENSG00000280477; ENSG00000185989	ENSMUSG00000031453
UniProt	Q14644	Q60790
RefSeq (mRNA)	NM_007368; NM_001320821; NM_001320822	NM_009025
RefSeq (protein)	NP_001307750; NP_001307751; NP_031394	NP_033051
Location (UCSC)	Chr 13: 113.98 – 114.13 Mb	Chr 8: 13.62 – 13.73 Mb
PubMed search
- Wikidata
View/Edit Human	View/Edit Mouse

Ras GTPase-activating protein 3 is an enzyme that in humans is encoded by the RASA3 gene.

The protein encoded by this gene is member of the GAP1 family of GTPase-activating proteins. The gene product stimulates the GTPase activity of normal RAS p21 but not its oncogenic counterpart. Acting as a suppressor of RAS function, the protein enhances the weak intrinsic GTPase activity of RAS proteins resulting in the inactive GDP-bound form of RAS, thereby allowing control of cellular proliferation and differentiation. This family member is an inositol 1,3,4,5-tetrakisphosphate-binding protein, like the closely related RAS p21 protein activator 2. The two family members have distinct pleckstrin-homology domains, with this particular member having a domain consistent with its localization to the plasma membrane. It has been shown that RASA3 promotes a shift from noncanonical to canonical TGF-β signaling through SMAD3 in B cells.

== Interactions ==
RASA3 has been shown to interact with HCK.
