= GEFT =

Protein-coding gene in humans

ARHGEF25

Identifiers
- Aliases: ARHGEF25, GEFT, p63RhoGEF, Rho guanine nucleotide exchange factor 25
- External IDs: OMIM: 610215; MGI: 1277173; GeneCards: ARHGEF25
Available structures
PDB	Ortholog search: PDBe RCSB
PDB	List of PDB id codes 2RGN

Gene location (Human)
Chr.	Chromosome 12 (human)
Band	12q13.3	Start	57,610,180 bp
Band	12q13.3	End	57,617,245 bp

Gene location (Mouse)
Chr.	Chromosome 10 (mouse)
Band	10 D3|10 74.5 cM	Start	127,018,394 bp
Band	10 D3|10 74.5 cM	End	127,025,952 bp
RNA expression pattern
Bgee	Human / Mouse (ortholog); Top expressed in: right hemisphere of cerebellum; right coronary artery; gastric mucosa; body of uterus; muscle layer of sigmoid colon; popliteal artery; tibial arteries; left uterine tube; myometrium; thoracic aorta / Top expressed in: dentate gyrus of hippocampal formation granule cell; hippocampus proper; CA3 field; primary visual cortex; primary motor cortex; superior frontal gyrus; vas deferens; Region I of hippocampus proper; umbilical cord; lateral septal nucleus; More reference expression data
BioGPS	n/a
Gene ontology
Molecular function	guanyl-nucleotide exchange factor activity
Cellular component	cytoplasm; cytosol; plasma membrane; myofibril; sarcomere; membrane
Biological process	regulation of Rho protein signal transduction; G protein-coupled receptor signaling pathway
Sources:Amigo / QuickGO
Orthologs
Databases	NCBI: entry; OMA: entry
Species	Human	Mouse
Entrez	115557	52666
Ensembl	ENSG00000240771	ENSMUSG00000019467
UniProt	Q86VW2	Q9CWR0
RefSeq (mRNA)	NM_001111270; NM_133483; NM_182947; NM_001347933	NM_001166413; NM_028027; NM_001358557; NM_001358558
RefSeq (protein)	NP_001104740; NP_891992; NP_001334862	NP_001159885; NP_082303; NP_001345486; NP_001345487
Location (UCSC)	Chr 12: 57.61 – 57.62 Mb	Chr 10: 127.02 – 127.03 Mb
PubMed search
- Wikidata
View/Edit Human	View/Edit Mouse

Rho guanine nucleotide exchange factor 25, also known as guanine nucleotide exchange factor (GEFT), is a protein that in humans is encoded by the ARHGEF25 gene. GEFT is an N-terminally truncated isoform (lacking of N- terminal) of the aforementioned ARHGEF25 gene that functions as a guanine nucleotide exchange factor that activates members of the Rho family of small GTPases by promoting the exchange of GDP for GTP. Through this activity, GEFT participates in regulation of the actin cytoskeletal dynamics, cell shape, migration, and signaling pathways. It is particularly expressed in excitable tissues.

== Nomenclature ==
The human gene encoding GEFT is officially named ARHGEF25 (Rho guanine nucleotide exchange factor 25) . The full length version (containing an N-terminus) of which is known as p63RhoGEF. Multiple transcript variants encoding different isoforms, including GEFT and p63RhoGEF, arise from alternative mRNA processing of the ARHGEF25 gene.

== Gene and isoforms ==
The ARHGEF25 gene contains multiple RefSeq and Ensembl transcript variants. The isoforms differ mainly in N terminal sequence:

- GEFT is the shorter version of the gene expressed, as it is N terminally truncated isoform version which selectively activates Rac1 and Cdc42 to perform functions.
- p63RhoGEF is the full length isoform which contains an extended N terminal regulatory region and selectively activates RhoA.

While p63RhoGEF's length (580 aa) has been experimentally verified, the exact amino acid length of the truncated GEFT version isoform has not been reported by a primary publication, and public databases have lists of multiple alternative variants of the isoform listed.

== Tissue distribution ==
GEFT is primarily expressed in tissues that are excitable, meaning highly active, examples of these include, the brain, heart, as well as muscle. In non-excitable tissues however little expression is found, tissues that don't have much activity. Overexpression of GEFT was found to lead to change in cell morphology and re-organization of the actin cytoskeleton of the organism of which it is present. In addition expression of GEFT in NIH3T3 cells promotes foci formation as well as cell proliferation, translation, and migration. p63RhoGEF protein when detected in the human heart and brain tissue localizes to sarcomeric I-bands which are enriched in cardiac actin (actin within the heart region).

== Function ==
GEFT is a protein isoform that is N-Terminally truncated, this GEFT is encoded by the ARHGEF25 gene in humans. This protein belongs to the Dbl family of guanine exchange factors (Dbl correlates is a large group of these) (GEFs), a group of proteins which activate Rho family GTPases. GEFT is a member of the Dbl family of guanine GEFT has been characterized as an activator of Rac1, Cdc42, and some contexts of RhoA, and plays roles in cytoskeletal organization, neurite development and cell morphology. The full length isoform p63RhoGEF acts as a RhoA (stands for Ras homolog family member A) specific GEF in vitro and links Gαq/11 coupled receptors leading to RhoA activation in vascular smooth muscle, suggesting a role in blood pressure regulation and angiotensin II signaling as well as further muscle involvements.

== Interactions ==
GEFT has shown to interact with multiple members of the afformentioned Rho family of small GTPases. Biochemical characterization shows that GEFT functions primarily as an exchange factor for both Rac1 and Cdc42, this displays strong guanine exchange activity toward both of these proteins. Through these interactions, GEFT promotes the formation of lamellipodia (these are broad sheet bumps at the edges of a moving cell), filopodia (thin spiky bumps extending from the cell surface, composed of tight bundles of actin), and microspikes in the membrane, which are consistent Rac1- and Cdc42- directed cytoskeletal remodeling. GEFT also activates downstream transcriptional pathways that include many different GTPases, including SRE, Elk1, SAP1. As well as significantly activating c-Jun, and AP-1 transcription factors. By activating all of these small GTPases (Rac1 and Cdc42), it strongly stimulates JNK signaling pathways and its transcriptional factors. GEFT can also bind and interact with RhoA, however, the exchange activity between the two is substantially weaker than aforementioned structures of which it interacts, resulting in only moderate stimulation of RhoA dependent SRE activity (Serum Response elements which is often found in the promoter of many genes).

== Clinical significance ==
Elevated expression of ARHGEF25 has been linked as a potential cause of cancer as it has been reported as elevated in several human cancer tumors. In a study of 180 patients with digestive tract malignancies, GEFT protein was detected in a high portion of tumor samples, including esophageal squamous cell carcinoma (80%), gastric carcinoma (83.3%) and colorectal cancer (86.7%), with lower expression to a significant volume in similar normal tissues. This information points to potential major correlations between overactive GEFT and cancer being present. Furthermore, p63RhoGEF is highly expressed in cardiac tissue, where it activates RhoA and regulates actin cytoskeletal organization. Its role as RhoA dependent stress fiber formation and localization to the cardiac sarcomere suggests potential involvement in cardiovascular disorders linked to altered RhoA signaling and cardiac muscle morphology. Additional disease associations have been reported including some linkage to Moyamoya angiopathy, although functional relevance remains unclear. ARHGEF25 has also been implicated in prostate cancer through gene disease association studies, but its mechanic contribution to tumorigenesis (also known as carcinogenesis), the process where normal cells turn into cancerous tumor cells, remains undetermined. Due to ARHGEF25 regulating vascular smooth muscle contraction and angiotensin- II responsive pathways, dysregulation may contribute to disorders of vascular tone and hypertension. The significance and causation of this correlation however is still inconclusive.

== Regulations ==
Regulation of GEFTG activity occurs through several mechanisms, although precise control of GEFT as an isoform is less well characterized that its fill length counterpart p63RhoGEF. Early studies of ARHGEF25 isoforms demonstrated that phosphorylation, membrane recruitment, as well as protein to protein interactions can influence accessibility of the DH (Dbl homology domain) to PH (Pleckstrin Homology domain) catalytic module to its RHO family substrates. Direct regulatory mechanisms for the GEFT isoform have not yet been largely experimentally defined due to its rare nature, and no studies have demonstrated GEFT specific phosphorylation, lipid binding, or protein mediated regulatory integrations, meaning that it lacks an obvious purpose in performing any of these activities. Unlike its full sized isoform counterpart, p63RhoGEF, GEFT lacks the N terminal autoinhibitory region shown to regulate the aforementioned p63RhoGEF activation through Gαq/11 signaling.

== Signaling pathways ==
GEFT participates in multiple signaling cascades due to its ability to activate Rac1 and Cdc42. These small GTPases function as molecular switches controlling downstream kinases, transcription factors, and cytoskeletal remodeling proteins. GEFT mediated activation of Rac1 stimulates the p21 activated kinase (PAK) family which in turn regulates LIM kinases (responsible for phosphorylating and inactivating actin severing cofilin) and cofilin (severs actin), leading to indirect ability to control actin turnover. Through its activation of Cdc42, GEFT indirectly promotes filopodia formation via the WASP-Arp 2/3 signaling pathway, which is a well established downstream effector mechanism of Cdc42 rather than a GEFT specific interaction however GEFT is able to activate this so it indirectly can cause this. In addition to regulating actin dynamics, GEFT strongly influences mitogen activated protein kinase (MAPK) signaling. Overexpression of GEFT has been shown to markedly activate the JNK pathway through Rac1 and Cdc42, resulting in increased phosphorylation and transcriptional activity of c-Jun and AP=1. Furthermore, elevated rates of GEFT is often linked in cancerous tumors. GEFT also can enhance serum-response element (SRE) dependent transcription and stimulates Elk1 and SAP1 activity in reporter assays, further linking GEFT to transcriptional responses downstream of Rho family GTPases. GEFT mediated JNK activation contributes to transcriptional programs associated with proliferation, transformation, and cell motility, and is considered a major component of GEFT's downstream signaling profile.

== Role in active development ==
GEFT also plays an active role in the formation of the nervous system and its pathways. In particular it is actively important in areas that require development or potential reshaping of a cell's cytoskeleton (specifically actin filaments). There have been neuroblastoma experiments (experiments in nerve cell cancers) as well as neurological pathways that show how GEFT can potentially enhance Retinoic acid (Vitamin A, retinol) and signaling molecule induced (cAMP induced) neurite extensions. This shows how GEFT can possible contribute to axon and dendritic growth as neurite outgrowth is often a marker for this axon and dendrite growth. In addition Rac1 and Cdc42 pathways that are controlled by GEFT are important to moveability of growth cones (located at the tip of a growing axon and/ or dendrite). These presences show potential for GEFT to be a core participant in formation of new neuron circuits.

== Role in disease ==
Experiments have also provided insights into how there are some minor pathological roles that GEFT provides, specifically how it relates to cancer. Specifically in NIH3T3, which is a fibroblast lining in mouses, it was shown that when GEFT is overexpressed it induces morphological transformations and growths that indicated oncogenic, the ability of forming cancerous tumors, within this lab tested setting. In tests of its relative effects on neurological systems it was found that when GEFT is dysregulated, or too much expressed GEFT has caused alterations in the neurites extensions and the spine of dendrites, which shows a linking between GEFT Rac1/Cdc42 signaling may impact neural development. Furthermore, it has also been linked to muscle regeneration due to its presence in excitable tissues of which muscle tissues belong. However, the overall effects of GEFT on human diseases and how it correlates is still greatly under research.
