= Dedicator of cytokinesis protein 1 =

Protein found in humans

DOCK1

Identifiers
- Aliases: DOCK1, DOCK180, ced5, Dock180, dedicator of cytokinesis 1
- External IDs: OMIM: 601403; MGI: 2429765; GeneCards: DOCK1
Available structures
PDB	Ortholog search: PDBe RCSB
PDB	List of PDB id codes 3L4C

Gene location (Human)
Chr.	Chromosome 10 (human)
Band	10q26.2	Start	126,905,409 bp
Band	10q26.2	End	127,452,517 bp

Gene location (Mouse)
Chr.	Chromosome 7 (mouse)
Band	7|7 F3	Start	134,272,383 bp
Band	7|7 F3	End	134,775,368 bp
RNA expression pattern
Bgee	Human / Mouse (ortholog); Top expressed in: corpus callosum; internal globus pallidus; olfactory bulb; stromal cell of endometrium; sural nerve; Achilles tendon; inferior ganglion of vagus nerve; C1 segment; amygdala; subthalamic nucleus / Top expressed in: Paneth cell; molar; endothelial cell of lymphatic vessel; vas deferens; mandibular prominence; ureter; vestibular membrane of cochlear duct; stria vascularis; maxillary prominence; adrenal gland; More reference expression data
BioGPS	n/a
Gene ontology
Molecular function	GTPase activator activity; guanyl-nucleotide exchange factor activity; SH3 domain binding; protein binding
Cellular component	membrane; guanyl-nucleotide exchange factor complex; cytoplasm; nucleus; cytosol; nuclear speck
Biological process	Fc-gamma receptor signaling pathway involved in phagocytosis; small GTPase mediated signal transduction; blood coagulation; phagocytosis, engulfment; vascular endothelial growth factor receptor signaling pathway; cytoskeleton organization; phagocytosis; integrin-mediated signaling pathway; cell migration; signal transduction; apoptotic process; positive regulation of GTPase activity; positive regulation of epithelial cell migration; positive regulation of substrate adhesion-dependent cell spreading
Sources:Amigo / QuickGO
Orthologs
Databases	NCBI: entry; OMA: entry
Species	Human	Mouse
Entrez	1793	330662
Ensembl	ENSG00000150760	ENSMUSG00000058325
UniProt	Q14185	Q8BUR4
RefSeq (mRNA)	NM_001290223; NM_001380	NM_001033420
RefSeq (protein)	NP_001277152; NP_001371; NP_001364472; NP_001364473; NP_001364475 NP_001364476; NP_001364477; NP_001364479; NP_001364482; NP_001364483; NP_001364485; NP_001364487; NP_001364489; NP_001364490	NP_001028592
Location (UCSC)	Chr 10: 126.91 – 127.45 Mb	Chr 7: 134.27 – 134.78 Mb
PubMed search
- Wikidata
View/Edit Human	View/Edit Mouse

Dedicator of cytokinesis protein 1 (Dock1), also (DOCK180), is a large (~180 kDa) protein encoded in the human by the DOCK1 gene, involved in intracellular signalling networks. It is the mammalian ortholog of the C. elegans protein CED-5 and belongs to the DOCK family of guanine nucleotide exchange factors (GEFs).

== Discovery ==
DOCK180 was identified, using a far-western blotting approach, as a binding partner of the adaptor protein Crk that was able to induce morphological changes in 3T3 fibroblasts. Subsequently it was reported that DOCK180 was able to activate the small GTP-binding protein (G protein) Rac1 and this was later shown to happen via its ability to act as a GEF.

== Structure and function ==
DOCK180 is part of a large class of proteins (GEFs) which contribute to cellular signalling events by activating small G proteins. In their resting state G proteins are bound to Guanosine diphosphate (GDP) and their activation requires the dissociation of GDP and binding of guanosine triphosphate (GTP). GEFs activate G proteins by promoting this nucleotide exchange.

DOCK180 and related proteins differ from other GEFs in that they do not possess the canonical structure of tandem DH-PH domains known to elicit nucleotide exchange. Instead they possess a DHR2 domain which mediates Rac activation by stabilising it in its nucleotide-free state. DOCK180-related proteins also possess a DHR1 domain which has been shown, in vitro, to bind phospholipids and which may be involved in their interaction with cellular membranes. Other structural features of Dock180 include an N-terminal SH3 domain involved in binding to ELMO proteins (see below) and a C-terminal proline-rich region which, in Myoblast city (the Drosophila melanogaster ortholog of DOCK180), was shown to bind DCrk (the Drosophila ortholog of Crk).

== Regulation of DOCK180 Activity ==
Under physiological conditions DOCK180 alone is inefficient at promoting nucleotide exchange on Rac. Effective GEF activity requires an interaction between Dock180 and its binding partner ELMO. ELMO1 is the most comprehensively described isoform of this small family of non-catalytically active proteins which function to recruit Dock180 to the plasma membrane and induce conformational changes which increase GEF efficiency. ELMO1 has also been reported to inhibit ubiquitinylation of Dock180 and so prevent its degradation by proteasomes. Receptor-mediated activation of RhoG (a small G protein of the Rac subfamily) is perhaps the best known inducer of Dock180 GEF activity. Active (GTP-bound) RhoG recruits the ELMO/Dock180 complex to the plasma membrane thereby bringing Dock180 into contact with its substrate, Rac. In tumour cells DOCK180 is regulated by a complex containing Crk and p130Cas which is in turn regulated by cooperative signalling by β_{3}-containing integrin complexes and the membrane-bound protein uPAR.

== Signalling Downstream of DOCK180 ==
DOCK180 is a Rac-specific GEF and so is responsible for a subset of Rac-specific signalling events. These include cell migration and phagocytosis of apoptotic cells in C. elegans, neurite outgrowth in PC12 cells and myoblast fusion in the zebrafish embryo. More recently the DHR1 domain of DOCK180 was shown to bind SNX5 (a sorting nexin) and this interaction promoted retrograde transport of the cation-independent mannose 6-phosphate receptor to the trans-Golgi network in a Rac-independent manner. Increased expression of DOCK180 and Elmo has been reported to contribute to glioma invasion.

== Interactions ==
DOCK180 has been shown to interact with:

- BCAR1,
- CRK
- ELMO1, and
- Grb2.
