= Ced-5 =

Cell death abnormality gene 5

Identifiers
- Organism: Caenorhabditis elegans
- Symbol: CED-5
- Entrez: 177942
- HomoloGene: 55575
- RefSeq (mRNA): NM_069537.7
- RefSeq (Prot): NP_501938.1
- UniProt: G5EEN3

Other data
- Chromosome: IV: 10.48 - 10.49 Mb
Search for
- Structures: Swiss-model
- Domains: InterPro

CED-5 is an ortholog of the mammalian protein Dock180，which is present in the nematode worm C. elegans., the Drosophila melanogaster ortholog of CED-5 is Myoblast city.
