= VAV2 =

Protein-coding gene in the species Homo sapiens

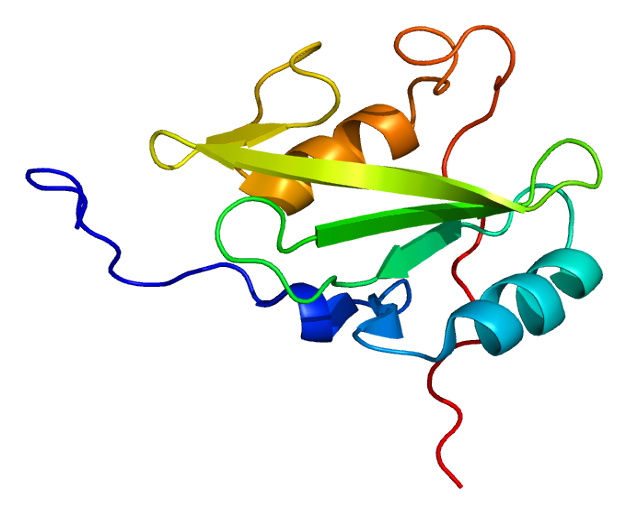

Identifiers
- Aliases: VAV2, VAV-2, vav guanine nucleotide exchange factor 2
- External IDs: OMIM: 600428; MGI: 102718; GeneCards: VAV2
Available structures
PDB	Ortholog search: PDBe RCSB
PDB	List of PDB id codes 2DLZ, 2DM1, 2LNW, 2LNX, 4ROJ

Gene location (Human)
Chr.	Chromosome 9 (human)
Band	9q34.2	Start	133,761,894 bp
Band	9q34.2	End	133,992,604 bp

Gene location (Mouse)
Chr.	Chromosome 2 (mouse)
Band	2 A3|2 19.36 cM	Start	27,152,116 bp
Band	2 A3|2 19.36 cM	End	27,317,045 bp
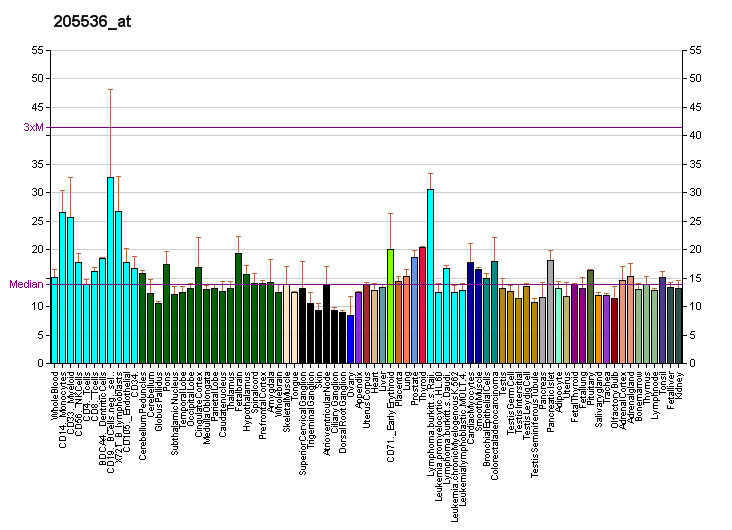

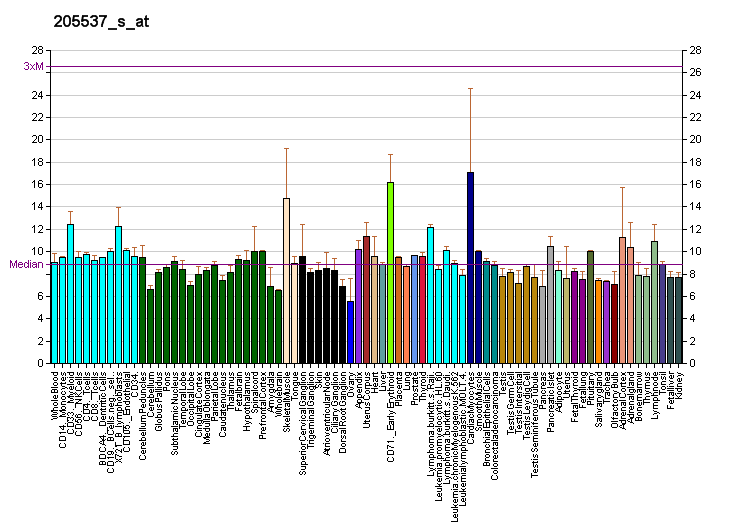
RNA expression pattern
Bgee	Human / Mouse (ortholog); Top expressed in: parotid gland; ganglionic eminence; ventricular zone; body of pancreas; right lobe of liver; caput epididymis; right adrenal cortex; corpus epididymis; left adrenal cortex; jejunal mucosa / Top expressed in: habenula; mesenteric lymph nodes; lumbar spinal ganglion; medullary collecting duct; seminal vesicula; cumulus cell; seminiferous tubule; conjunctival fornix; ganglionic eminence; molar; More reference expression data
BioGPS	More reference expression data
Gene ontology
Molecular function	guanyl-nucleotide exchange factor activity; epidermal growth factor receptor binding; metal ion binding; protein binding; phosphotyrosine residue binding
Cellular component	cytoplasm; cytosol; plasma membrane
Biological process	regulation of cell size; intracellular signal transduction; Fc-gamma receptor signaling pathway involved in phagocytosis; regulation of GTPase activity; ephrin receptor signaling pathway; positive regulation of phosphatidylinositol 3-kinase activity; platelet activation; Fc-epsilon receptor signaling pathway; vascular endothelial growth factor receptor signaling pathway; cell projection assembly; angiogenesis; positive regulation of apoptotic process; regulation of Rho protein signal transduction; regulation of small GTPase mediated signal transduction; cell migration; signal transduction; lamellipodium assembly; small GTPase mediated signal transduction; G protein-coupled receptor signaling pathway
Sources:Amigo / QuickGO
Orthologs
Databases	NCBI: entry; OMA: entry
Species	Human	Mouse
Entrez	7410	22325
Ensembl	ENSG00000160293	ENSMUSG00000009621
UniProt	P52735	Q60992
RefSeq (mRNA)	NM_001134398; NM_003371	NM_009500
RefSeq (protein)	NP_001127870; NP_003362	NP_033526
Location (UCSC)	Chr 9: 133.76 – 133.99 Mb	Chr 2: 27.15 – 27.32 Mb
PubMed search
- Wikidata
View/Edit Human	View/Edit Mouse

Guanine nucleotide exchange factor VAV2 is a protein that in humans is encoded by the VAV2 gene.

VAV2 is the second member of the VAV oncogene family. Unlike VAV1, which is expressed exclusively in hematopoietic cells, VAV2 transcripts were found in most tissues.

== Interactions ==
VAV2 is a GEF for RAC1, specifically in fibroblasts VAV2 is necessary for integrin, but not growth factor–dependent activation of RAC leading to lamellipodia formation. Double DH domain mutations, L342R/L343SVav2 function as a dominant negative, blocking VAV2 GEF activity for RAC1 and a PH domain mutant is required for recruitment of VAV2 to the membrane in order to elicit GEF activity. VAV2 has also been shown to regulate collagen phagocytosis in a RAC1-dependent manner and interact with CD19 and Grb2.
