= ELMO (protein) =

Protein family

ELMO/CED-12 family

Identifiers
- Symbol: ELMO_CED12
- Pfam: PF04727
- InterPro: IPR006816
- PROSITE: PDOC51335
Available protein structures:
- PDB: IPR006816 PF04727 (ECOD; PDBsum)
- AlphaFold: IPR006816; PF04727

ELMO (Engulfment and Cell Motility) is a family of related proteins (~82 kDa) involved in intracellular signalling networks. These proteins have no intrinsic catalytic activity and instead function as adaptors which can regulate the activity of other proteins through their ability to mediate protein-protein interactions.

This family contains members in all animals. In humans there are three paralogous isoforms:

- ELMO1
- ELMO2
- ELMO3

The ELMO domain was first characterized in the CED-12 proteins of Caenorhabditis elegans and Drosophila melanogaster, which is a homolog to the ELMO protein found in mammals. This protein is involved in Rac-GTPase activation, apoptotic cell phagocytosis, cell migration, and cytoskeletal rearrangements.

== Structure and function of ELMO proteins ==
The ELMO family are evolutionarily conserved orthologs of the C. elegans protein CED-12. All isoforms contain a series of armadillo repeats, which begin at the N-terminus and extend around two thirds of the way along the protein, as well as a C-terminal proline-rich motif and a central PH domain. They function as part of a protein complex with Dock180-related proteins to form a bipartite guanine nucleotide exchange factor for Rac (a member of the Rho family of small G proteins). The Dock180-ELMO interaction requires the ELMO PH domain and also involves binding of the ELMO proline-rich motif to the Dock180 SH3 domain.
