= Transforming protein RhoA =

Protein and coding gene in humans

RHOA
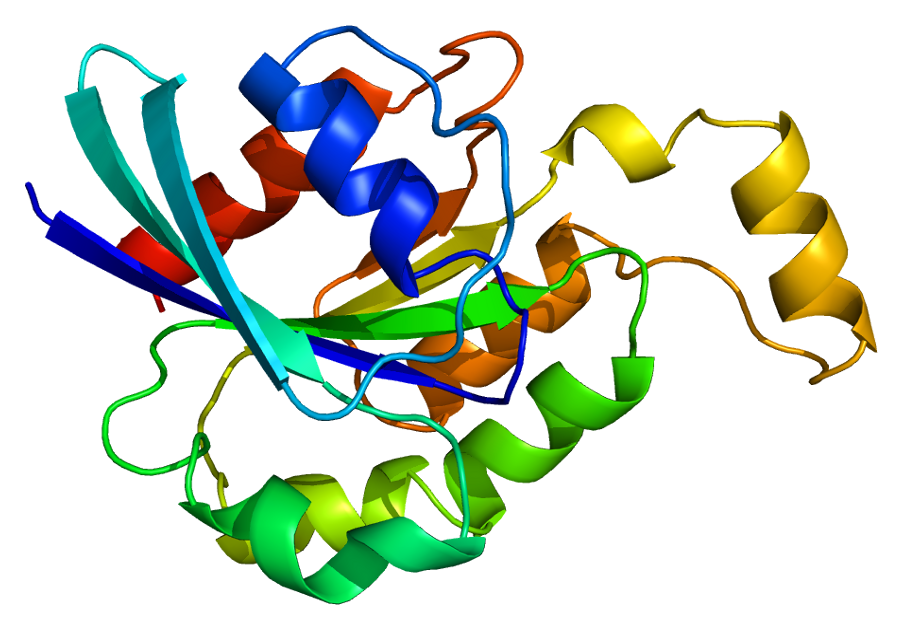

Identifiers
- Aliases: RHOA, ARH12, ARHA, RHO12, RHOH12, ras homolog family member A, EDFAOB
- External IDs: OMIM: 165390; MGI: 1096342; GeneCards: RHOA
Available structures
PDB	Ortholog search: PDBe RCSB
PDB	List of PDB id codes 5BWM, 1A2B, 1CC0, 1CXZ, 1DPF, 1FTN, 1KMQ, 1LB1, 1OW3, 1S1C, 1TX4, 1X86, 1XCG, 2RGN, 3KZ1, 3LW8, 3LWN, 3LXR, 3MSX, 3T06, 4D0N, 4XH9, 4XSG, 4XSH, 4XOI, 5A0F, 5FR2, 5FR1, 5JCP, 5C2K, 5C4M, 5HPY
Enzyme activity
EC #	BRENDA	ExPASy	KEGG	MetaCyc
3.6.5.2	↗	↗	↗	↗

Gene location (Human)
Chr.	Chromosome 3 (human)
Band	3p21.31	Start	49,359,139 bp
Band	3p21.31	End	49,412,998 bp

Gene location (Mouse)
Chr.	Chromosome 9 (mouse)
Band	9|9 F2	Start	108,183,328 bp
Band	9|9 F2	End	108,215,133 bp
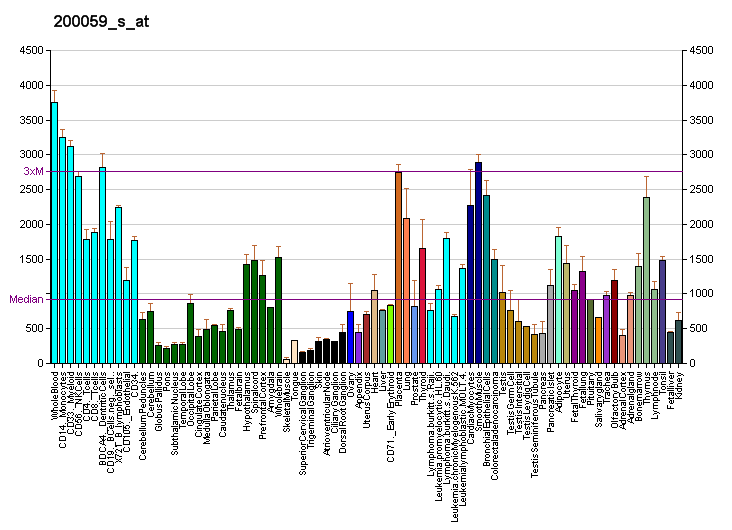

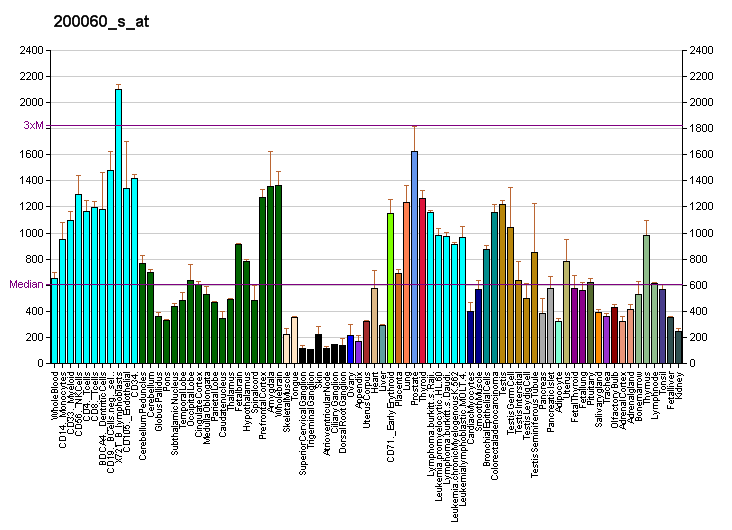

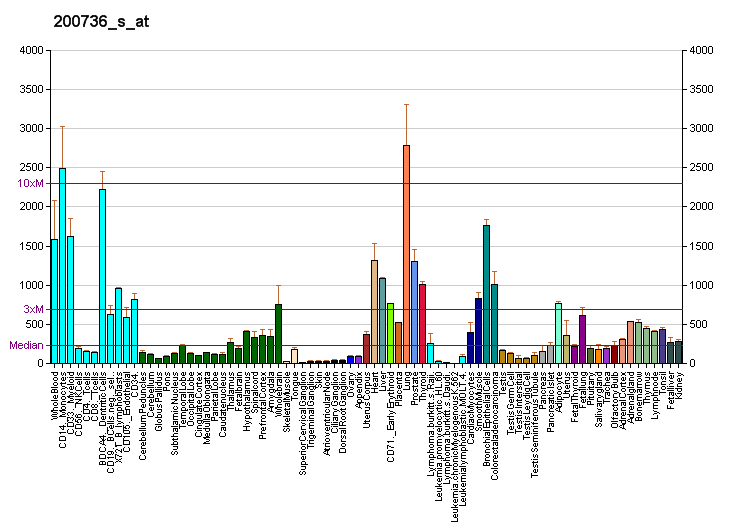
RNA expression pattern
Bgee	Human / Mouse (ortholog); Top expressed in: monocyte; skin of hip; popliteal artery; tibial arteries; synovial joint; thymus; right lung; skin of arm; trabecular bone; left coronary artery / Top expressed in: seminal vesicula; ascending aorta; aortic valve; granulocyte; left lung lobe; thymus; dermis; umbilical cord; decidua; stroma of bone marrow; More reference expression data
BioGPS	More reference expression data
Gene ontology
Molecular function	nucleotide binding; myosin binding; GTP binding; protein binding; GTPase activity; GDP binding; protein kinase binding; protein domain specific binding; Rho GDP-dissociation inhibitor binding
Cellular component	cytoplasm; vesicle; cytosol; endosome; cell projection; endoplasmic reticulum membrane; membrane; focal adhesion; extrinsic component of cytoplasmic side of plasma membrane; plasma membrane; cell junction; cell cortex; midbody; cleavage furrow; cytoskeleton; apical junction complex; extracellular exosome; cell periphery; lamellipodium; secretory granule membrane; ficolin-1-rich granule membrane; nucleus; axon; cell division site; ruffle membrane; dendritic spine; intracellular membrane-bounded organelle; postsynapse; glutamatergic synapse; intracellular anatomical structure
Biological process	actin cytoskeleton reorganization; ossification involved in bone maturation; apolipoprotein A-I-mediated signaling pathway; regulation of cell migration; negative chemotaxis; regulation of actin cytoskeleton organization; cleavage furrow formation; substantia nigra development; ephrin receptor signaling pathway; endothelial tube lumen extension; Roundabout signaling pathway; positive regulation of axonogenesis; stress fiber assembly; positive regulation of lipase activity; regulation of osteoblast proliferation; cell division; positive regulation of cytokinesis; platelet activation; negative regulation of cell migration involved in sprouting angiogenesis; positive regulation of protein serine/threonine kinase activity; mitotic cleavage furrow formation; mitotic spindle assembly; negative regulation of axonogenesis; vascular endothelial growth factor receptor signaling pathway; skeletal muscle satellite cell migration; trabecula morphogenesis; positive regulation of neuron differentiation; Rho protein signal transduction; positive regulation of I-kappaB kinase/NF-kappaB signaling; cell cycle; viral process; regulation of small GTPase mediated signal transduction; transforming growth factor beta receptor signaling pathway; cell migration; apical junction assembly; wound healing, spreading of cells; endothelial cell migration; positive regulation of stress fiber assembly; actin cytoskeleton organization; phosphatidylinositol-mediated signaling; small GTPase mediated signal transduction; regulation of cell motility; Wnt signaling pathway, planar cell polarity pathway; protein deubiquitination; neutrophil degranulation; cell morphogenesis; response to hypoxia; angiotensin-mediated vasoconstriction involved in regulation of systemic arterial blood pressure; alpha-beta T cell lineage commitment; regulation of systemic arterial blood pressure by endothelin; regulation of transcription by RNA polymerase II; cytoskeleton organization; actin filament organization; cell adhesion; cell-matrix adhesion; G protein-coupled receptor signaling pathway; skeletal muscle tissue development; regulation of actin polymerization or depolymerization; regulation of cell shape; response to mechanical stimulus; response to glucose; negative regulation of cell-substrate adhesion; regulation of neuron projection development; negative regulation of neuron projection development; cerebral cortex cell migration; forebrain radial glial cell differentiation; cell differentiation; positive regulation of cell growth; positive regulation of cell migration; androgen receptor signaling pathway; positive regulation of actin filament polymerization; establishment or maintenance of actin cytoskeleton polarity; stress-activated protein kinase signaling cascade; negative regulation of intracellular steroid hormone receptor signaling pathway; cell junction assembly; odontogenesis; negative regulation of I-kappaB kinase/NF-kappaB signaling; response to amino acid; positive regulation of cysteine-type endopeptidase activity involved in apoptotic process; beta selection; negative regulation of neuron apoptotic process; positive regulation of neuron apoptotic process; establishment of epithelial cell apical/basal polarity; response to ethanol; negative regulation of neuron differentiation; positive regulation of translation; positive regulation of cell adhesion; negative regulation of cell size; positive regulation of vasoconstriction; positive regulation of smooth muscle contraction; GTP metabolic process; positive regulation of alpha-beta T cell differentiation; neuron projection morphogenesis; regulation of dendrite development; actin filament bundle assembly; response to glucocorticoid; regulation of focal adhesion assembly; regulation of calcium ion transport; negative regulation of cell death; regulation of microtubule cytoskeleton organization; cellular response to lipopolysaccharide; cellular response to cytokine stimulus; positive regulation of podosome assembly; negative regulation of oxidative phosphorylation; positive regulation of NIK/NF-kappaB signaling; negative regulation of reactive oxygen species biosynthetic process; positive regulation of vascular associated smooth muscle contraction; positive regulation of leukocyte adhesion to vascular endothelial cell; regulation of modification of synaptic structure; regulation of modification of postsynaptic actin cytoskeleton; cellular response to chemokine; regulation of neural precursor cell proliferation; positive regulation of T cell migration
Sources:Amigo / QuickGO
Orthologs
Databases	NCBI: entry; OMA: entry
Species	Human	Mouse
Entrez	387	11848
Ensembl	ENSG00000067560	ENSMUSG00000007815
UniProt	P61586	Q9QUI0
RefSeq (mRNA)	NM_001313941; NM_001313943; NM_001313944; NM_001313945; NM_001313946 NM_001313947; NM_001664	NM_016802; NM_001313961; NM_001313962
RefSeq (protein)	NP_001300870; NP_001300872; NP_001300873; NP_001300874; NP_001300875 NP_001300876; NP_001655; NP_001300870.1; NP_001655.1	NP_001300890; NP_001300891; NP_058082
Location (UCSC)	Chr 3: 49.36 – 49.41 Mb	Chr 9: 108.18 – 108.22 Mb
PubMed search
- Wikidata
View/Edit Human	View/Edit Mouse

Transforming protein RhoA, also known as Ras homolog family member A (RhoA), is a small GTPase protein in the Rho family of GTPases that in humans is encoded by the RHOA gene. While the effects of RhoA activity are not all well known, it is primarily associated with cytoskeleton regulation, mostly actin stress fiber formation and actomyosin contractility. It acts upon several effectors. Among them, ROCK1 (Rho-associated, coiled-coil containing protein kinase 1) and DIAPH1 (Diaphanous Homologue 1, a.k.a. hDia1, homologue to mDia1 in mouse, diaphanous in Drosophila) are the best described. RhoA, and the other Rho GTPases, are part of a larger family of related proteins known as the Ras superfamily, a family of proteins involved in the regulation and timing of cell division. RhoA is one of the oldest Rho GTPases, with homologues present in the genomes since 1.5 billion years. As a consequence, RhoA is somehow involved in many cellular processes which emerged throughout evolution. RhoA specifically is regarded as a prominent regulatory factor in other functions such as the regulation of cytoskeletal dynamics, transcription, cell cycle progression and cell transformation.

== Structure ==
The specific gene that encodes RhoA, RHOA, is located on chromosome 3 and consists of four exons, which has also been linked as a possible risk factor for atherothrombolic stroke.

Similar to other GTPases, RhoA presents a Rho insert in its primary sequence in the GTPase domain. RhoA contains also four insertion or deletion sites with an extra helical subdomain; these sites are characteristic of many GTPases in the Rho family. Most importantly, RhoA contains two switch regions, Switch I and Switch II, whose conformational states are modified following the activation or inactivation of the protein. Both of these switches have characteristic folding, correspond to specific regions on the RhoA coil and are uniformly stabilized via hydrogen bonds. The conformations of the Switch domains are modified depending on the binding of either GDP or GTP to RhoA. The nature of the bound nucleotide and the ensuing conformational modification of the Switch domains dictates the ability of RhoA to bind or not with partner proteins (see below).

The primary protein sequences of members of the Rho family are mostly identical, with the N-terminal containing most of the protein coding for GTP binding and hydrolysis. The C-terminal of RhoA is modified via prenylation, anchoring the GTPase into membranes, which is essential for its role in cell growth and cytoskeleton organization. Key amino acids that are involved in the stabilization and regulation of GTP hydrolysis are conserved in RhoA as Gly14, Thr19, Phe30 and Gln63.

Correct localization of the RhoA proteins is heavily dependent on the C-terminus; during prenylation, the anchoring of the prenyl group is essential for the stability, inhibition of and the synthesis of enzymes and proliferation. RhoA is sequestered by dissociation inhibitors (RhoGDIs) which remove the protein from the membrane while preventing its further interaction with other downstream effectors.

== Activation mechanism ==
RhoA acquires both inactive GDP-bound and active GTP-bound conformational states; these states alternate between the active and inactive states via the exchange of GDP to GTP (conducted simultaneously via guanine nucleotide exchange factors and GTPase activating factor). RhoA is activated primarily by guanine nucleotide exchange factors (GEFs) via phosphorylation; due to large network of overlapping phosphorylation, a multitude of GEFs are utilized to enable specific signaling pathways. These structural arrangements provide interaction sites that can interact with effectors and guanine factors in order to stabilize and signal the hydrolysis of GTP. Activation levels of RhoA and associated GEFs are measured using RhoA and GEF pull down assays that uses Rhotekin and mutant RhoA G17A beads respectively

== Participation in cellular processes ==
RhoA is primarily involved in these activities: actin organization, myosin contractility, cell cycle maintenance, cellular morphological polarization, cellular development and transcriptional control.

=== Actin organization ===
RhoA is prevalent in regulating cell shape, polarity and locomotion via actin polymerization, actomyosin contractility, cell adhesion, and microtubule dynamics. In addition, RhoA is believed to act primarily at the rear (uropod) of migrating cells to promote detachment, similar to the attachment and detachment process found in the focal adhesion mechanism. Signal transduction pathways regulated via RhoA link plasma membrane receptors to focal adhesion formation and the subsequent activation of relevant actin stress fibers. RhoA directly stimulates actin polymerization through activation of diaphanous-related formins, thereby structurally changing the actin monomers to filaments. ROCK kinases induce actomyosin-based contractility and phosphorylate TAU and MAP2 involved in regulating myosins and other actin-binding proteins in order to assist in cell migration and detachment. The concerted action of ROCK and Dia is essential for the regulation of cell polarity and organization of microtubules. RhoA also regulates the integrity of the extracellular matrix and the loss of corresponding cell-cell adhesions (primarily adherens and tight junctions) required for the migration of epithelial. RhoA's role in signal transduction mediation is also attributed to the establishment of tissue polarity in epidermal structures due to its actin polymerization to coordinate vesicular motion; movement within actin filaments forms webs that move in conjunction with vesicular linear motion. As a result, mutations present in the polarity genes indicate that RhoA is critical for tissue polarity and directed intracellular movement.

=== Cell development ===
RhoA is required for processes involving cell development, some of which include outgrowth, dorsal closure, bone formation, and myogenesis. Loss of RhoA function is frequently attributed to failed gastrulation and cell migration inability. In extension, RhoA has been shown to function as an intermediary switch within the overall mechanically mediated process of stem cell commitment and differentiation. For example, human mesenchymal stem cells and their differentiation into adipocytes or osteocytes are direct results of RhoA's impact on cell shape, signaling and cytoskeletal integrity. Cell shape acts as the primary mechanical cue that drives RhoA activity and downstream effector ROCK activity to control stem cell commitment and cytoskeletal maintenance. Transforming growth factor (TGF)-mediated pathways that control tumor progression and identity are also frequently noted to be RhoA-dependent mechanisms. TGF-β1, a tumor suppressive growth factor, is known to regulate growth, differentiation and epithelial transformation in tumorigenesis. Instead of blocking growth, TGF-β1 directly activates RhoA in epithelial cells while blocking its downstream target, p160; as a result, activated RhoA-dependent pathways induce stress fiber formation and subsequent mesenchymal properties .

=== Transcriptional control ===
Activated RhoA also participates in regulating transcriptional control over other signal transduction pathways via various cellular factors. RhoA proteins help potentiate the transcription independent of ternary complex factors when activated while simultaneously modulating subsequent extracellular signal activity. It has also been shown that RhoA mediates serum-, LPA- and AIF4-induced signaling pathways in addition to regulating the transcription of the c-fos promoter, a key component in the formation of the ternary complex producing the serum and ternary factors. RhoA signaling and modulation of actin polymerization also regulates Sox9 expression via controlling transcriptional Sox9 activity. The expression and transcriptional activity of Sox9 is directly linked with the loss of RhoA activity and illustrates how RhoA participates in the transcriptional control of specific protein expression.

=== Cell cycle maintenance ===
RhoA as well as several other members of the Rho family are identified as having roles in the regulation of the cytoskeleton and cell division. RhoA plays a pivotal role in G1 cell cycle progression, primarily through regulation of cyclin D1 and cyclin-dependent kinase inhibitors (p21 and p27) expression. These regulation pathways activate protein kinases, which subsequently modulate transcription factor activity. RhoA specifically suppresses p21 levels in normal and transformed cell lines via a p53-independent transcriptional mechanism while p27 levels are regulated using effector Rho-associated kinases. Cytokinesis is defined by actomyosin-based contraction. RhoA-dependent diaphanous-related formins (DRFs) localize to the cleavage furrow during cytokinesis while stimulating local actin polymerization by coordinating microtubules with actin filaments at the site of the myosin contractile ring. Differences in effector binding distinguish RhoA amongst other related Ras homologs GTPases. Integrins can modulate RhoA activity depending on the extracellular matrix composition and other relevant factors. Similarly, RhoA's stimulation of PKN2 kinase activity regulates cell-cell adhesion through apical junction formation and disassembly. Though RhoA is most easily recognized from its unique contributions in actin-myosin contractility and stress fiber formation, new research has also identified it as a key factor in the mediation of membrane ruffling, lamellae formation and membrane blebbing. A majority of this activity occurs in the leading edge of cells during migration in coordination with membrane protrusions of breast carcinoma.

== RhoA pathway ==
Molecules act on various receptors, such as NgR1, LINGO1, p75, TROY and other unknown receptors (e.g. by CSPGs), which stimulates RhoA. RhoA activates ROCK (RhoA kinase) which stimulates LIM kinase, which then inhibits cofilin, which effectively reorganizes the actin cytoskeleton of the cell. In the case of neurons, activation of this pathway results in growth cone collapse, therefore inhibits the growth and repair of neural pathways and axons. Inhibition of this pathway by its various components usually results in some level of improved re-myelination. After global ischemia, hyperbaric oxygen (at least at 3 ATA) appears to partially suppress expression of RhoA, in addition to Nogo protein (Reticulon 4), and a subunit of its receptor Ng-R. The MEMO1-RhoA-DIAPH1 signaling pathway plays an important role in ERBB2-dependent stabilization of microtubules at the cell cortex. A recent study shows that RhoA-Rho kinase signaling mediates thrombin-induced brain damage.

p75NTR serves as a regulator for actin assembly. Ras homolog family member A (RhoA) causes the actin cytoskeleton to become rigid which limits growth cone mobility and inhibits neuronal elongation in the developing nervous system. p75NTR without a ligand bound activates RhoA and limits actin assembly, but neurotrophin binding to p75NTR can inactivate RhoA and promote actin assembly. p75NTR associates with the Rho GDP dissociation inhibitor (RhoGDI), and RhoGDI associates with RhoA. Interactions with Nogo can strengthen the association between p75NTR and RhoGDI. Neurotrophin binding to p75NTR inhibits the association of RhoGDI and p75NTR, thereby suppressing RhoA release and promoting growth cone elongation (inhibiting RhoA actin suppression).

== Interactions ==
RHOA has been shown to interact with:

- ARHGAP1,
- ARHGAP5,
- ARHGDIA,
- ARHGEF11,
- ARHGEF12,
- ARHGEF3,
- CIT
- DGKQ,
- DIAPH1,
- GEFT,
- ITPR1,
- KCNA2,
- KTN1,
- MAP3K1,
- PKN2,
- PLCG1,
- Phospholipase D1,
- Protein kinase N1,
- RAP1GDS1,
- RICS,
- ROCK1,
- TRIO, and
- TRPC1.

== Clinical significance ==
=== Cancer ===
Given that its overexpression is found in many malignancies, RhoA activity has been linked within several cancer applications due to its significant involvement in cancer signaling cascades. Serum response factors (SRFs) are known to mediate androgen receptors in prostate cancer cells, including roles ranging from distinguishing benign from malignant prostate and identifying aggressive disease. RhoA mediates androgen-responsiveness of these SRF genes; as a result, interference with RhoA has been shown to prevent the androgen regulation of SRF genes. In application, RhoA expression is notably higher in malignant prostate cancer cells compared to benign prostate cells, with elevated RhoA expression being associated with elevated lethality and aggressive proliferation. On the other hand, silencing RhoA lessened androgen-regulated cell viability and handicapped prostate cancer cell migration.

RhoA has also been found to be hyper activated in gastric cancer cells; in consequence, suppression of RhoA activity partially reversed the proliferation phenotype of gastric cancer cells via the down-regulation of the RhoA-mammalian Diaphanous 1 pathway. Doxorubicin has been referred to frequently as a highly-promising anti-cancer drug that is also being utilized in chemotherapy treatments; however, as with nearly all chemotherapeutics, the issue of drug resistance remains. Minimizing or postponing this resistance would the necessary dose to eradicate the tumor, thus diminishing drug toxicity. Subsequent RhoA expression decrease has also been associated with increased sensitivity to doxorubicin and the complete reversion of doxorubicin resistance in certain cells; this shows the resilience of RhoA as a consistent indicator anti-cancer activity. In addition to promoting tumor-suppression activity, RhoA also has inherent impact upon the efficacy of drugs in relation to cancer functionality and could be applied to gene therapy protocols in future research.

Protein expression of RhoA has been identified to be significantly higher in testicular tumor tissue than that in nontumor tissue; expression of protein for RhoA, ROCK-I, ROCK-II, Rac1, and Cdc42 was greater in tumors of higher stages than lower stages, coinciding with greater lymph metastasis and invasion in upper urinary tract cancer. Although both RhoA and RhoC proteins comprise a significant part of the Rho GTPases that are linked to promoting the invasive behavior of breast carcinomas, attributing specific functions to these individual members has been difficult. We have used a stable retroviral RNA interference approach to generate invasive breast carcinoma cells (SUM-159 cells) that lack either RhoA or RhoC expression. Analysis of these cells enabled us to deduce that RhoA impedes and RhoC stimulates invasion. Unexpectedly, this analysis also revealed a compensatory relationship between RhoA and RhoC at the level of both their expression and activation, and a reciprocal relationship between RhoA and Rac1 activation. Chronic Myeloid Leukemia (CML), a stem cell disorder that prevents myeloid cells from functioning correctly, has been linked to actin polymerization. Signaling proteins like RhoA, regulate polymerization of actin. Due to differences proteins exhibited between normal and affected neutrocytes, RhoA has become the key element; further experimentation has also shown that RhoA-inhibiting pathways prevent the overall growth of CML cells. As a result, RhoA has significant potential as a therapeutic target in gene therapy techniques to treating CML. Therefore, RhoA's role in the proliferation of cancer cell phenotypes is a key application that can be applied to targeted cancer therapeutics and the development for pharmaceuticals.

=== Drug applications ===
In June 2012, a new drug candidate named "Rhosin" was synthesized by researchers at the Cincinnati Children's Hospital, a drug with the full intention to inhibit cancer proliferation and promote nerve cell regeneration. This inhibitor specifically targets Rho GTPases to prevent cell growth related to cancer. When tested on breast cancer cells, Rhosin inhibited growth and the growth of mammary spheres in a dose dependent manner, functioning as targets for RhoA while simultaneously maintaining the integrity of normal cellular processes and normal breast cells. These promising results indicate Rhosin's general effectiveness in preventing breast cancer proliferation via RhoA targeting.

=== Possible target for asthma and diabetes drugs ===
RhoA's physiological functions have been linked to the contraction and migration of cells which are manifested as symptoms in both asthma and diabetes (i.e. airflow limitation and hyper-responsiveness, desensitization, etc.). Due to pathophysiological overlap of RhoA and Rho-kinase in asthma, both RhoA and Rho-kinase have become promising new target molecules for pharmacological research to develop alternate forms of treatment for asthma. RhoA and Rho kinase mechanisms have been linked to diabetes due to the up-regulated expression of targets within type 1 and 2 diabetic animals. Inhibition of this pathway prevented and ameliorated pathologic changes in diabetic complications, indicating that RhoA pathway is a promising target for therapeutic development in diabetes treatment
