= C20orf141 =

Protein-coding gene in the species Homo sapiens

Identifiers
- Aliases: C20orf141, dJ860F19.4, chromosome 20 open reading frame 141
- External IDs: MGI: 1922906; HomoloGene: 50959; GeneCards: C20orf141; OMA:C20orf141 - orthologs

Gene location (Human)
Chr.	Chromosome 20 (human)
Band	20p13	Start	2,814,987 bp
Band	20p13	End	2,815,833 bp

Gene location (Mouse)
Chr.	Chromosome 2 (mouse)
Band	2|2 F1	Start	130,247,179 bp
Band	2|2 F1	End	130,247,994 bp
RNA expression pattern
Bgee	Human / Mouse (ortholog); Top expressed in: left testis; right testis; testicle; placenta; myometrium; smooth muscle tissue; body of uterus; gonad; canal of the cervix; ectocervix / Top expressed in: seminiferous tubule; spermatid; embryo; spermatocyte; primary visual cortex; superior frontal gyrus; neural layer of retina; dentate gyrus of hippocampal formation granule cell; lens; cerebellar cortex; More reference expression data
BioGPS	n/a
Orthologs
Species	Human	Mouse
Entrez	128653	75656
Ensembl	ENSG00000258713	ENSMUSG00000027409
UniProt	Q9NUB4	Q9DA59
RefSeq (mRNA)	NM_080739; NM_001256538	NM_001163483; NM_029375
RefSeq (protein)	NP_001243467; NP_542777	NP_001156955; NP_083651
Location (UCSC)	Chr 20: 2.81 – 2.82 Mb	Chr 2: 130.25 – 130.25 Mb
PubMed search
- Wikidata
View/Edit Human	View/Edit Mouse

Chromosome 20 open reading frame 141 (c20orf141) is a protein encoded by the c20orf141 gene in Humans (Homo sapiens). Human c20orf141 is located on the short arm of Chromosome 20 in region 1 and band 3. It is a single-pass membrane protein predicted to be localized in the membrane, and is a member of the uncharacterized DUF5562 (PF17717) protein superfamily.

== Gene ==
Human c20orf141 spans 5,136 base pairs, from positions 2,795,614 to 2,800,930 on the plus strand of Chromosome 20 (20p13). It sits downstream of a carboxypeptidase-encoding gene and upstream of a vacuolar protein sorting gene. C20orf141 sits upstream of PC-Esterase Domain Containing 1A (PCED1A), Receptor-Type Tyrosine-Protein Phosphatase Alpha (PTPRA), Vacuolar Protein Sorting Protein 16 (VPS16). C20orf141 is also downstream of Carboxypeptidase X1 (CPXM1) and overlaps with Transmembrane Protein 239 (TMEM239).

C20orf141 is also known under the aliases MGC26144 and LOC128653.

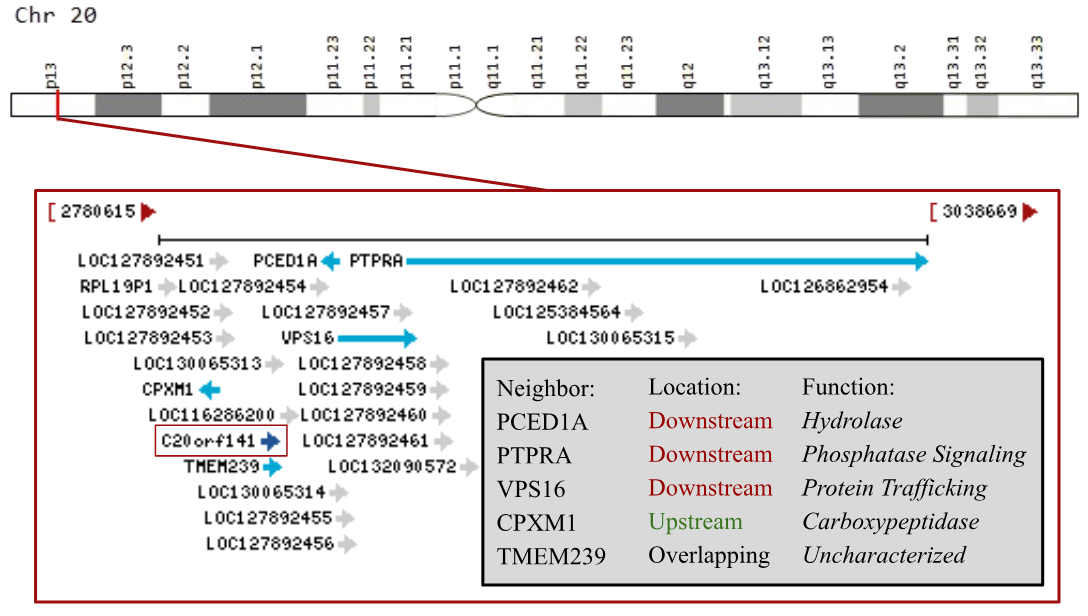
5'-3' gene neighborhood depiction of c20orf141 (denoted by dark blue) on Chromosome 20. Four Neighbors are denoted by light blue.

== RNA transcript ==
Human c20orf141 has two mRNA transcript variants, differing in 5' and 3' untranslated regions (UTRs). mRNA transcript variant 1 contains 2 exons and 1 intron, while mRNA transcript variant 2 contains 3 exons and 2 introns. Both mRNA variants encode the same protein isoform.

== Protein ==
Human c20orf141 is predicted to be a single-pass membrane protein. The protein encoded by the gene c20orf141 has 165 amino acids, a molecular weight of ~17.4 kDa, and an isoelectric point of ~7.8. There is only one human isoform of c20orf141. C20orf141 is leucine-rich compared to other human proteins but poor in asparagine, tyrosine, and lysine. DTU Health predicts six different phosphorylation sites at Ser31, Ser66, Ser50, Thr67, Ser104, and Ser129.

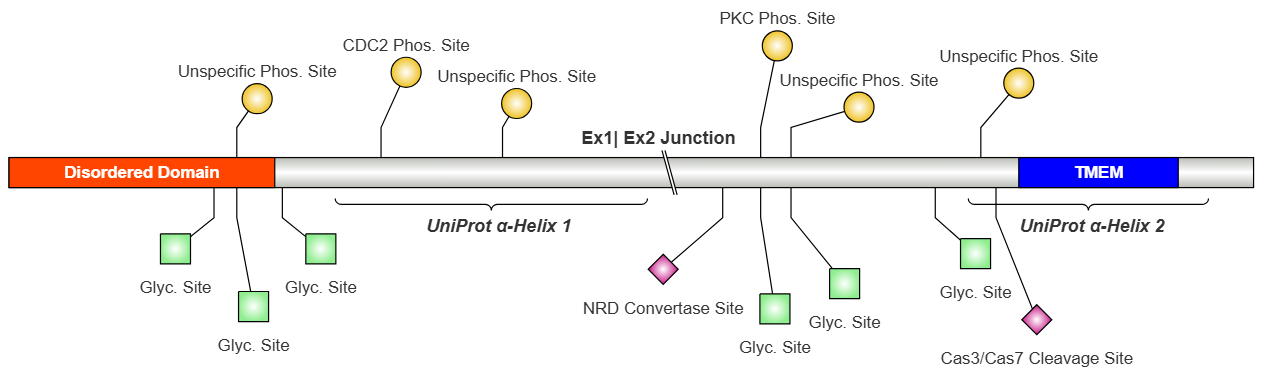
2D diagram of c20orf141 protein sequence, including exon junctions, predicted post-translational modifications, and major motifs.

Human c20orf141 has a disordered region and transmembrane domain. However, human c20orf141 has two predicted alpha helices in concentrated clusters of hydrophobic amino acids.

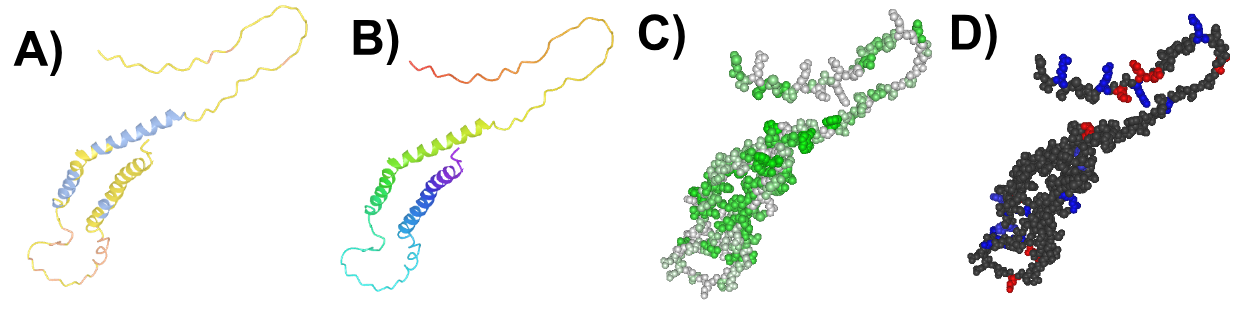
UniProt protein structure of c20orf141 viewed through NCBI iCn3D structural viewer. A) accuracy probabilities of c20orf141 (blue means more likely). B) The C-terminus is depicted in purple, and the N-terminus is denoted in red. C) hydrophobicity of c20orf141, where darker green indicates higher hydrophobicity. D) charges of c20orf141, where blue is negative and red is positive.

=== Localization ===
Rabbit c20orf141 protein is localized in the plasma membrane of cells, as identified by an immunocytochemistry analysis of the GAMG cell line. Human c20orf141 is predicted to be subcellularly localized in membrane-bound organelles, specifically the endoplasmic reticulum according to PSORT II.

=== Conceptual translation ===
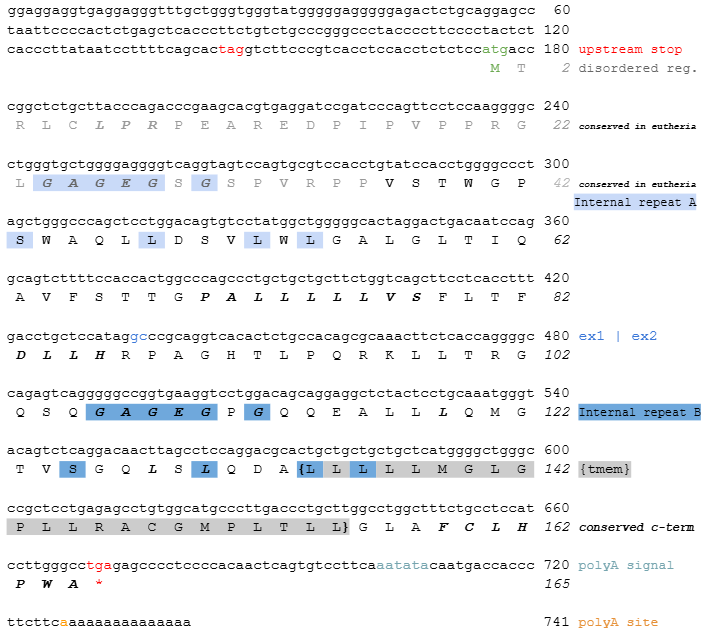
Conceptual translation of human c20orf141 transcript variant 1.

=== Protein-protein interactions ===
Human c20orf141 is an interaction partner with Apolipoprotein E (APOE), Ataxin-1 (ATXN1), Huntingtin (HTT), and Junctophilin-3 (JPH3), which are involved in neuronal development and implicated in neurological disorders like Bipolar Disorder, Huntington's Disease, and Alzheimer's. One study investigating laminopathies found no evidence that the protein encoded by human c20orf141 binds to or interacts with lamin A, a structural integrity protein. In addition to neurological-associated proteins, human c20orf141 binds to major inflammatory and immune response regulators like ENDOD1, IL17F, and ZDHHC17. Human 20orf141 also engages in protein-protein interactions with CCDC12, FUNDC2, and ACTA2, which are involved in blood cell maintenance and survival.

== Expression ==
=== Tissues ===
Human c20orf141 is expressed highly in the placenta, testis, and epididymis. Moderate levels of human c20orf141 expression are also seen in the adrenal gland, fetal brain, heart, fetal kidney, skeletal muscle, ovary, and skin tissues. Expression is observed to be incredibly low in the colon and retina tissue.

=== Conditions ===
Human c20orf141 expression in intestinal cells is relatively low when linoleic acid or a mixture of trans-10 and cis-12 conjugated linoleic acid (CLA) is present. However, when both cis-9 and trans-11 CLA isomers, associated with anti-inflammatory responses, are present, c20orf141 expression drops significantly and becomes in the bottom 25th percentile of gene expression.

c20orf141 baseline expression is relatively low in tubular cells. Expression is also unchanged in the presence of only C-peptide or a mixture of TGF-β1 and C-peptide. However, c20orf141 expression drops to very low levels when in the presence of only TGF-β1.

At baseline levels in CUTLL1 cells, expression is low to moderate (just above the 50th percentile of overall expression). The transduction of MigR1 and DN-MAML plasmid vectors to activate the Notch cell-communication pathway results in lower expression of c20orf141.

== eQTLs ==
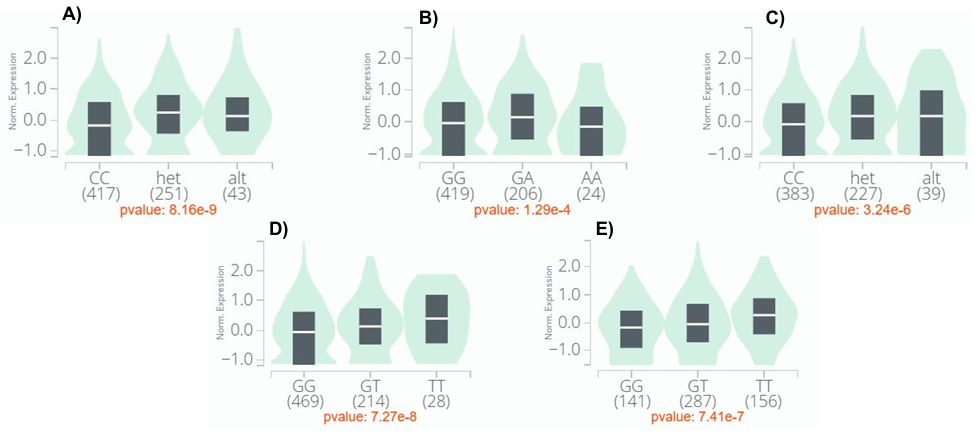
GTExPortal eQTLs of c20orf141. A) Expression in subcutaneous adipose fat tissue (rs3830832). B) Expression in cultured fibroblast cells (rs73077077). C) Expression in cultured fibroblast cells (rs3830832). D) Expression in subcutaneous adipose fat tissue (rs58220726). E) Expression in visceral adipose fat tissue in the omentum (rs615568).

All known expression quantitative trait loci (eQTLs) of c20orf141 are found downstream of the 3' untranslated region (UTR). In subcutaneous and visceral (omentum) adipose tissue, homozygous genotypes have lower expression, while alternative allele genotypes have the highest. Similarly, the homozygous genotype in fibroblast cells has the lowest expression.

== Clinical significance ==
Human c20orf141 is upregulated in clear cell renal cell carcinoma (ccRCC). Human c20orf141 is downregulated in the sigmoid colon's mucosa (inner lining) in irritable bowel syndrome.

== Evolution ==
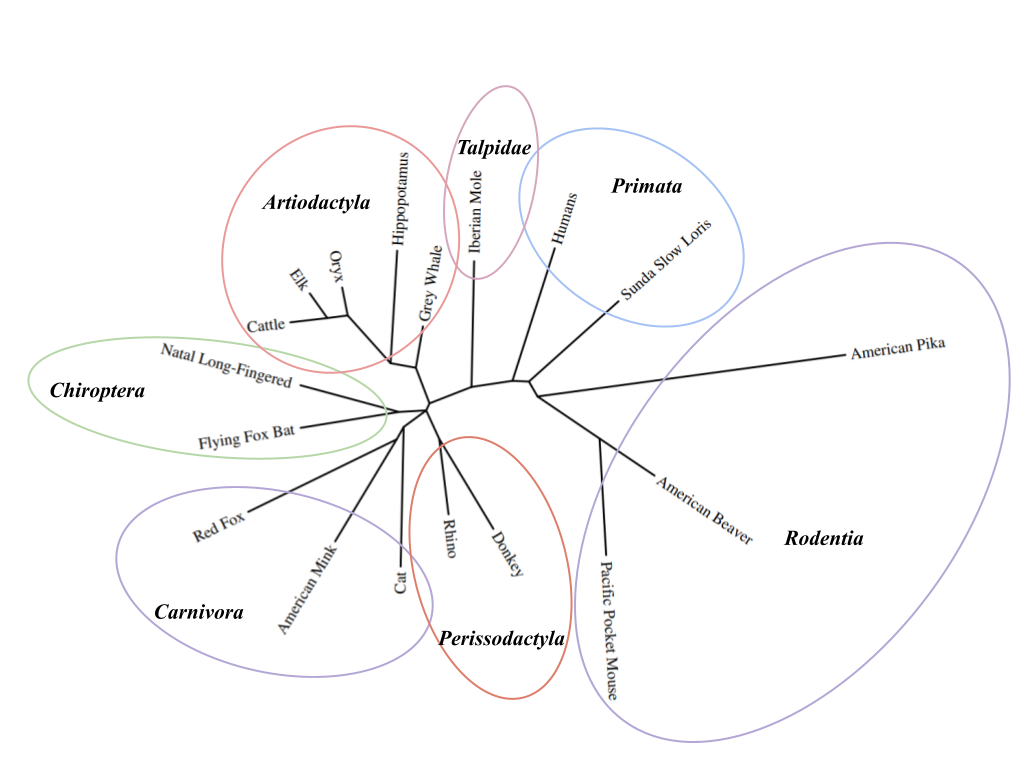
Unrooted phylogenetic tree of c20orf141 among clade Mammalia.

C20orf141 orthologs are found only in mammals, specifically in the infraclasses metatheria and eutheria. Orthologs of c20orf141 are specifically found in Primata, Rodentia, Artiodactyla, Perissodactyla, Talpidae, Chiroptera, and Carnivora. Within eutheria, c20orf141 orthlogs are only found in opossums. C20orf141 has no known paralogs.

C20orf141 is likely to have emerged 160 million years ago (MYA), as the most distant ortholog to humans is found in opossums.

The protein sequence of c20orf141 has two predicted internal repeats. However, only its second internal repeat at Met1-Gly55 and Asp73-Leu137 is conserved among orthologous sequences.

Genus	Common name	Taxon	Date of Divergence (MYA)	Accession number	Sequence Number (AA)	Sequence identity % ! !Sequence similarity %	
Homo sapiens	Humans	Primates	0.0	NP_542777.1	165	100.0	100.0
Pan troglodytes	Chimpanzee	Primates	6.4	XP_001159993.1	165	98.2	98.8
Nycticebus coucang	Sunda slow loris	Primates	74.0	XP_053430470.1	165	77.2	82.0
Urocitellus parryii	Arctic squirrel	Rodentia	87.0	XP_026265484.1	167	73.7	80.8
Castor canadensis	American beaver	Rodentia	87.0	XP_020029419.2	261	71.4	76.8
Perognathus longimembris	Pocket mouse	Rodentia	87.0	XP_048205328.1	164	69.2	74.8
Ochotona princeps	American pika	Rodentia	87.0	XP_004585728.2	165	69.5	76.7
Mus musculus	House mice	Rodentia	87.0	NP_001156955.1	131	64.6	73.2
Talpa occidentalis	Iberian mole	Eulipotyphla	94.0	XP_037377215.1	167	72.7	76.4
Pteropus vampyrus	Flying fox bat	Chiroptera	94.0	XP_011367784.1	167	73.6	77.8
Miniopterus natalensis	Natal bat	Chiroptera	94.0	XP_016071282.1	173	68.8	74.6
Felis catus	Domestic cat	Carnivora	94.0	XP_003983796.2	167	71.1	78.3
Neogale vison	American mink	Carnivora	94.0	XP_044118321.1	167	70.1	76.0
Vulpes vulpes	Red fox	Carnivora	94.0	XP_025868051.1	168	69.0	75.6
Eschrichtius robustus	Grey whale	Whippomorpha	94.0	XP_068381043.1	165	75.3	80.1
Hippopotamus amphibius	Hippo	Whippomorpha	94.0	XP_057557119.1	167	72.5	77.3
Lipotes vexillifer	Baiji Dolphin	Whippomorpha	94.0	XP_007465451.1	172	71.5	77.9
Equus asinus	Donkey	Perissodactyla	94.0	XP_014717342.1	167	75.5	78.4
Cervus canadensis	Elk	Cervidae	94.0	XP_043336499.1	163	75.0	80.5
Oryx dammah	Scimitar oryx	Bovidae	94.0	XP_040103245.1	165	74.7	80.7
Diceros bicornis minor	Black Rhino	Perissodactyla	94.0	KAF5924871.1	164	74.2	74.1
Bos taurus	Domestic cattle	Bovidae	94.0	XP_002692279.2	165	73.5	79.5
Gracilinanus agilis	Mouse Opossum	Marsupialia	160.0	XP_044537729.1	188	38.2	50.9
Monodelphis domestica	Gray Opossum	Marsupialia	160.0	XP_007497002.2	239	36.6	50.0
