= FGD1 =

Protein-coding gene in the species Homo sapiens

Identifiers
- Aliases: FGD1, AAS, FGDY, MRXS16, ZFYVE3, FYVE, RhoGEF and PH domain containing 1
- External IDs: OMIM: 300546; MGI: 104566; GeneCards: FGD1

Gene location (Human)
Chr.	X chromosome (human)
Band	Xp11.22	Start	54,445,454 bp
Band	Xp11.22	End	54,496,234 bp

Gene location (Mouse)
Chr.	X chromosome (mouse)
Band	X F3|X 68.46 cM	Start	149,829,146 bp
Band	X F3|X 68.46 cM	End	149,872,517 bp
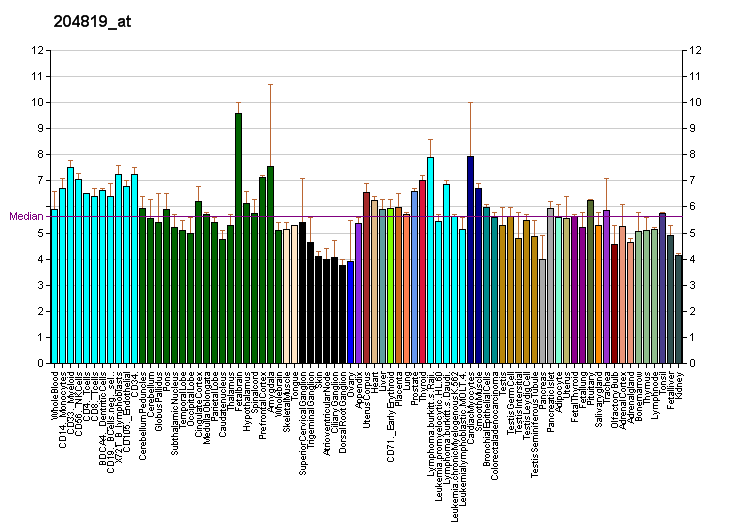
RNA expression pattern
Bgee	Human / Mouse (ortholog); Top expressed in: stromal cell of endometrium; ganglionic eminence; ventricular zone; cartilage tissue; postcentral gyrus; entorhinal cortex; prefrontal cortex; superior frontal gyrus; right ovary; gonad / Top expressed in: Rostral migratory stream; tail of embryo; genital tubercle; otic vesicle; internal carotid artery; zygote; saccule; ventricular zone; yolk sac; epiblast; More reference expression data
BioGPS	More reference expression data
Gene ontology
Molecular function	metal ion binding; small GTPase binding; guanyl-nucleotide exchange factor activity
Cellular component	cytoplasm; Golgi apparatus; cell projection; cytosol; lamellipodium; ruffle; cytoskeleton
Biological process	regulation of Rho protein signal transduction; signal transduction; multicellular organism development; cytoskeleton organization; positive regulation of apoptotic process; regulation of GTPase activity; filopodium assembly; regulation of small GTPase mediated signal transduction; regulation of cell shape; actin cytoskeleton organization; animal organ morphogenesis; G protein-coupled receptor signaling pathway
Sources:Amigo / QuickGO
Orthologs
Databases	NCBI: entry; OMA: entry
Species	Human	Mouse
Entrez	2245	14163
Ensembl	ENSG00000102302	ENSMUSG00000025265
UniProt	P98174	P52734
RefSeq (mRNA)	NM_004463	NM_008001
RefSeq (protein)	NP_004454; NP_004454.2	NP_032027
Location (UCSC)	Chr X: 54.45 – 54.5 Mb	Chr X: 149.83 – 149.87 Mb
PubMed search
- Wikidata
View/Edit Human	View/Edit Mouse

FYVE, RhoGEF and PH domain-containing protein 1 (FGD1) also known as faciogenital dysplasia 1 protein (FGDY), zinc finger FYVE domain-containing protein 3 (ZFYVE3), or Rho/Rac guanine nucleotide exchange factor FGD1 (Rho/Rac GEF) is a protein that in humans is encoded by the FGD1 gene that lies on the X chromosome. Orthologs of the FGD1 gene are found in dog, cow, mouse, rat, and zebrafish, and also budding yeast and C. elegans. It is a member of the FYVE, RhoGEF and PH domain containing family.

FGD1 is a guanine-nucleotide exchange factor (GEF) that can activate the Rho GTPase Cdc42. It localizes preferentially to the trans-Golgi network (TGN) of mammalian cells and regulates, for example, the secretory transport of bone-specific proteins from the Golgi complex. Thus Cdc42 and FGD1 regulate secretory membrane trafficking that occurs especially during bone growth and mineralization in humans. FGD1 promotes nucleotide exchange on the GTPase Cdc42, a key player in the establishment of cell polarity in all eukaryotic cells. The GEF activity of FGD1, which activates Cdc42, is harbored in its DH domain and causes the formation of filopodia, enabling the cells to migrate. FGD1 also activates the c-Jun N-terminal kinase (JNK) signaling cascade, important in cell differentiation and apoptosis. It also promotes the transition through G1 during the cell cycle and causes tumorgenic transformation of NIH/3T3 fibroblasts.

The FGD1 gene is located on the short arm of the X-chromosome and is essential for normal mammalian embryonic development. Mice embryos that carried experimentally introduced mutations in the FGD1 gene had skeletal abnormalities affecting bone size, cartilage growth, vertebrae formation and distal extremities. These severe phenotypes are consistent with a lack of Cdc42 activity, as it controls membrane traffic as well as the organization of the actin cytoskeleton. Mutations in the FGD1 gene that cause the production of non-functional proteins are responsible for the severe phenotype of the X-linked disorder faciogenital dysplasia (FGDY), also called Aarskog-Scott syndrome.

== Structure ==
The mature human protein contains several characteristic motifs and domains that are involved in the protein's function. The 961 amino acid long protein has an approximate size of 106 kDa. The N-terminal is a proline-rich stretch, predicted to encode two partially overlapping src homology 3 (SH3)-binding domains, stretches from amino acid 7 – 330, followed by a DH domain (DBL homology domain), which harbors the GEF enzymatic activity, and lies between the residue 373 – 561, then a first PH domain between residues 590 – 689, a FYVE zinc finger domain (named after the four proteins it was found in Fab1, YOTB, Vac1, and EEA1) between residues 730 – 790, and a second PH domain between residues 821 – 921.

The DH domain is required for the activation of Cdc42, through the catalytic exchange of GDP with GTP on Cdc42, while the PH domains confer membrane binding. The prolin-rich domain interacts with cortactin and actin-binding protein 1. FYVE-finger domains are conserved through evolution and often involved in membrane trafficking (e.g. Vac1p, Vps27p, Fab1, Hrs-2). One class of these domains was shown to bind selectively to phosphatidylinositol 3-phosphate. PH domains are known to specifically bind to polyphosphoinositides and influence the enzymatic activity of the GEF they are located in.

== Function ==
FGD1 activates Cdc42 by exchanging GDP bound to Cdc42 for GTP and regulates the recruitment of Cdc42 to Golgi membranes. Levels of both FGD1 and Cdc42 are enriched on the Golgi complex itself and their interdependence regulates the transport of cargo proteins from the Golgi. FGD1 and Cdc42 colocalize in the trans-Golgi network. FGD1 inhibition has an inhibitory effect on post-Golgi transport. Another interaction partner of FGD1 is cortactin, which is directly bound by the proline-rich domain of FGD1. As cortactin is known to promote actin polymerization by the Arp2/3 complex, this interaction seems to promote actin assembly.

FGD1 is also transiently associated with and required for the formation of membrane protrusions on invasive tumor cells.

== Tissue distribution ==
Human FGD1 is expressed predominantly in fetal tissues of brain and kidney, but also present in the heart and lung. It is hardly detectable in the corresponding adult tissues. FGD1 is expressed in areas of bone formation and post-natally in skeletal tissue, the perichondrium, joint capsule fibroblasts and resting chondrocytes.

== Clinical significance ==
Mutations in the FGD1 gene cause phenotypes associated with the X-linked recessively transmitted faciogenital dysplasia (FGDY), also known as Aarskog–Scott syndrome, a human developmental disorder that can occur with neurological problems.

The disease phenotypes are due to improper bone formation and is more often seen in males though the severity depends on age. Mutations in the FGD1 gene are randomly distributed in all the domains of the protein product, modifying the intracellular localization and/or the GEF catalytic activity of FGD1. Up to 2010 twenty distinct mutations have been reported, including three missense mutations (R402Q; S558W; K748E), four truncating mutations (Y530X; R656X; 806delC; 1620delC), one in-frame deletion (2020_2022delGAG) and the first reported splice site mutation (1935þ3A→C).

Increased expression of FGD1 correlates with tumor aggressiveness in prostate and breast cancer, linking the protein to cancer progression.

== See also ==
- CDC42
