= FYVE =

FYVE may refer to:

- FYVE domain
- FYVE finger-containing phosphoinositide kinase
- FYVE, RhoGEF and PH domain containing
