= RUN domain =

Protein domain

Identifiers
- Symbol: RUN
- Pfam: PF02759
- InterPro: IPR004012
Available protein structures:
- PDB: IPR004012 PF02759 (ECOD; PDBsum)
- AlphaFold: IPR004012; PF02759

The RUN domain is an evolutionary conserved protein–protein binding protein domain. They often interact with GTPases and could play a role in multiple Ras-like GTPase signalling pathways.

This domain is present in several proteins that are linked to the functions of GTPases in the Rap and Rab families. They could hence play important roles in multiple Ras-like GTPase signaling pathways. The domain comprises six conserved regions, which in some proteins have considerable insertions between them. The domain core is thought to take up a predominantly alpha fold, with basic amino acids in regions A and D possibly playing a functional role in interactions with Ras GTPases.

== Examples ==
Human genes encoding proteins containing this domain include:

- LOC440456;
- PLEKHM1; PLEKHM2;
- RAB6IP1; RPIB9; RPIP8; RUFY1; RUFY2; RUFY3; RUFY4; RUNDC1; RUNDC2A; RUNDC3B; RUSC1; RUSC2;
- SGSM1; SGSM2; SGSM3;
