= RUFY2 =

Protein-coding gene in humans

Identifiers
- Aliases: RUFY2, RABIP4R, ZFYVE13, RUN and FYVE domain containing 2
- External IDs: OMIM: 610328; MGI: 1917682; GeneCards: RUFY2

Gene location (Human)
Chr.	Chromosome 10 (human)
Band	10q21.3	Start	68,341,107 bp
Band	10q21.3	End	68,407,294 bp

Gene location (Mouse)
Chr.	Chromosome 10 (mouse)
Band	10 B4|10 32.51 cM	Start	62,816,002 bp
Band	10 B4|10 32.51 cM	End	62,852,989 bp
RNA expression pattern
Bgee	Human / Mouse (ortholog); Top expressed in: Achilles tendon; right hemisphere of cerebellum; C1 segment; tendon of biceps brachii; sural nerve; Brodmann area 9; right frontal lobe; ganglionic eminence; prefrontal cortex; epithelium of colon / Top expressed in: Rostral migratory stream; lumbar spinal ganglion; tail of embryo; superior frontal gyrus; neural layer of retina; primary visual cortex; cerebellar cortex; genital tubercle; olfactory epithelium; substantia nigra; More reference expression data
BioGPS	n/a
Gene ontology
Molecular function	metal ion binding; SH3 domain binding
Cellular component	nucleus; cytoplasm; endosome
Biological process	regulation of endocytosis; biological process
Sources:Amigo / QuickGO
Orthologs
Databases	NCBI: entry; OMA: entry
Species	Human	Mouse
Entrez	55680	70432
Ensembl	ENSG00000204130	ENSMUSG00000020070
UniProt	Q8WXA3	Q8R4C2
RefSeq (mRNA)	NM_001042417; NM_001278225; NM_017987; NM_001330103	NM_027425
RefSeq (protein)	NP_001035882; NP_001265154; NP_001317032; NP_060457	NP_081701
Location (UCSC)	Chr 10: 68.34 – 68.41 Mb	Chr 10: 62.82 – 62.85 Mb
PubMed search
- Wikidata
View/Edit Human	View/Edit Mouse

RUN and FYVE domain containing 2 (RUFY2) is a protein that in humans is encoded by the RUFY2 gene. The RUFY2 gene is named for two of its domains, the RUN domain and FYVE domains. RUFY2 is a member of the RUFY family of proteins that include RUFY1, RUFY2, RUFY3, and RUFY4. RUFY2 protein has a dynamic role in endosomal membrane trafficking.

== Gene ==
Homo sapiens Chromosome 10 with RUFY2 gene highlighted in red

The human RUFY2 gene is located on the long (q) arm of chromosome 10 at region 21 band 3, from base pair 70,100,864 to base pair 70,167,051 on the reverse strand (Build GRCh37/hg19) (map). The gene produces a 2,080 base pair mRNA. There are 18 predicted exons in the human gene with 13 alternative transcripts.

=== Gene neighborhood ===
8,180 base pairs upstream of RUFY2 is the protein-coding gene for phenazine biosynthesis-like protein domain containing (PBLD). While 6,770 base pairs downstream from RUFY2 is a DNA2 conserved helicase/nuclease involved in the maintenance of mitochondrial and nuclear DNA stability.

== Protein ==
Features of the RUFY2 protein depicting the RUN, DUF972, PspA_IM30 and FYVE domains.

The protein of RUFY2 consists of 655 amino acid residues. RUFY2 protein contains a N-terminal RUN domain and a C-terminal FYVE domain with 2 coiled coil domains in between. The molecular weight of the mature protein is 70.0 kdal with an isoelectric point of 5.494. PHYRE2 protein tertiary structure tool suggests that RUFY2 has 15 alpha helices and the longest helix spanning amino acids 199...512 as seen in the figure to the right. RUFY2 is a soluble protein that localizes to the nucleus and to membranes of early endosomes. RUFY2 protein contains no signal peptide, no DNA/RNA binding sites, no mitochondrial targeting motifs and no peroxisomal targeting signal in the C-terminus. There is no transmembrane domain in RUFY2.

=== RUN domain ===
The RUN domain is between amino acids 45...168 and consists of the RPIP8, UNC-14, and NESCA proteins. The RUN domain has been shown to have interacting functions with GTPases in the Rap and Rab signal transduction pathways and endosomal membrane trafficking.

=== DUF972 ===
Domain of unknown function that is part of a family of hypothetical bacterial sequences pfam06156. It make be linked to the YabA initiation control protein which functions as the chromosomal replication initiation control in bacteria.

=== PspA/IM30 ===
The PspA/IM30 family is a negative regulator of sigma54 transcription initiation factor in bacteria.

=== FYVE domain ===
FYVE domain consists of Fab-1, YGL023, Vps27, and EEA1 proteins. Within the FYVE domain there are Zinc finger binding sites that interact with phosphatidylinositol-3-phosphate, to bring target proteins to membrane lipids.

=== Protein interactions ===
The proline rich motif in the FYVE domain of RUFY2 has been shown to have binding activity with the SH3 domain of EPHA3 (Etk) in signal transduction pathways.

=== Post-translational modifications ===
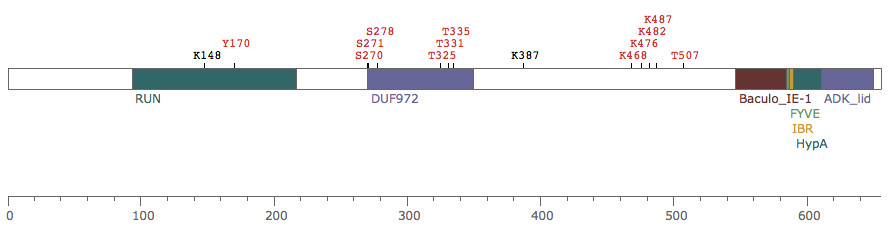
Modification sites on RUFY2 protein

RUFY2 possibly has 6 phosphorylation sites and are located mainly in the DUF972 region. RUFY2 also has 6 protein kinase C phosphorylation sites that are located mainly within the FYVE domain.

==== Other notable modification sites within the protein ====
- 4 Lysine acetylation sites
- 4 N-myristolation sites
- 3 N-glycosylation sites

== Homology and evolution ==
RUFY2 has 4 paralogs: RUFY3, RUFY1, RUNDC3A, RUNDC3B.

There are 60 orthologs of RUFY2 that have been identified including mammals, some birds, reptiles and fish. RUFY2 is highly conserved among its orthologs but is not present in plants, bacteria, archea or protist.

=== Species distribution ===
The following table lists the homologs of RUFY2.

Genus Species	Organism Common Name	Divergence from Humans (MYA)	NCBI mRNA Accession	Sequence Similarity	Protein Length	Common Gene Name
Homo sapiens	Humans	--	AF461266	100%	606	RUFY2
Pan troglodytes	Common Chimp	6.4	XM_513483	99%	641	Predicted RUFY2
Pongo abelii	Orangutan	15.7	NM_001133232	99%	606	Predicted RUFY2
Macaca mulatta	Rhesus monkey	29.2	XM_001083568	100%	606	Predicted RUFY2
Sus scrofa	Wild Boar	94.2	XM_001928184	99%	640	Predicted: Predicted RUFY2
Mus musculus	Mouse	942.4	AF484555	95%	606	RUFY2
Gallus gallus	Chicken	301.7	XM_421568	95%	606	Predicted RUFY2
Taeniopygia guttata	Zebra Finch	295.0	XM_002190773	95%	590	RUFY2 transcript variant 2
Xenopus (Silurana) tropicalis	Western Clawed Frog	371.2	NM_001016214	77%	606	RUFY2
Danio rerio	Zebra Fish	400.1	NM_001105681	89%	602	RUFY2 transcript variant 2
Salmo salar	Salmon	427	NM_001139888	91%	427	RUFY2
Anolis carolinensis	Carolina anole	301.7	XM_003223694	91%	649	Predicted RUFY2
Drosophila melanogaster	Fruit fly	782.7	NM_170324	63%	729	CG31064

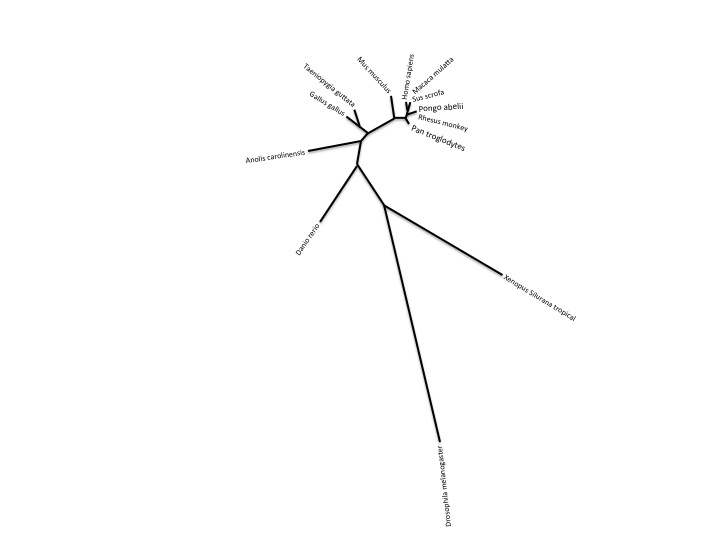
Unrooted phylogenetic tree of RUFY2 protein

== Clinical significance ==
Certain neurodegenerative diseases such as Alzheimer's have been found to have defective endosomal trafficking. Therefore, the involvement of RUFY2 protein domains, RUN and FYVE, may possibly play a role in neurodegenerative diseases such as Alzheimer's.

== Expression ==
RUFY2 protein has been shown to mainly be expressed in the brain, lung, and testes while microarray expression shows RUFY2 ubiquitous expression.
