= TMEM239 =

Protein-coding gene in the species Homo sapiens

Identifiers
- Aliases: TMEM239, transmembrane protein 239
- External IDs: MGI: 1914016; HomoloGene: 122214; GeneCards: TMEM239; OMA:TMEM239 - orthologs

Gene location (Human)
Chr.	Chromosome 20 (human)
Band	20p13	Start	2,816,302 bp
Band	20p13	End	2,820,284 bp

Gene location (Mouse)
Chr.	Chromosome 2 (mouse)
Band	2|2 F1	Start	130,248,398 bp
Band	2|2 F1	End	130,249,822 bp
RNA expression pattern
Bgee	Human / Mouse (ortholog); Top expressed in: right testis; left testis; testicle; placenta; wall of uterus; myometrium; cervix; ectocervix; canal of the cervix; left uterine tube / Top expressed in: testicle; spermatid; spermatocyte; neural layer of retina; cerebellum; cerebellar cortex; superior frontal gyrus; hypothalamus; lens; olfactory bulb; More reference expression data
BioGPS	n/a
Orthologs
Species	Human	Mouse
Entrez	100288797	66766
Ensembl	ENSG00000198326	ENSMUSG00000049692
UniProt	Q8WW34	Q9DA47
RefSeq (mRNA)	NM_001167670; NM_001318207	NM_025753
RefSeq (protein)	NP_001161142; NP_001305136	NP_080029
Location (UCSC)	Chr 20: 2.82 – 2.82 Mb	Chr 2: 130.25 – 130.25 Mb
PubMed search
- Wikidata
View/Edit Human	View/Edit Mouse

Within mammalia, TMEM239 orthologs are found in organisms belonging to eutheria and metatheria, but not prototheria. No human paralogs for TMEM239 have been identified.

== Expression ==
Based on human expressed sequence tag (EST) profiles, TMEM239 appears to be expressed in the testis and the brain. According to PaxDb, the abundance of TMEM239 falls within the bottom 10% relative to all other proteins in both mice and humans. Overall, expression of TMEM239 is limited. TMEM239 appears to be expressed at moderate levels in the testes, with low expression in a variety of other tissues, including the brain and submaxillary gland.

== Interactions ==
TMEM239 protein interactions appear to be implicated in cell signaling, membrane transport and immunology. Human T-cell leukemia virus type-1 Protein TAX-1 (TAX) and Beta-2-microglobulin (B2M) were found to interact with TMEM239 through a host-pathogen yeast two hybrid screen.

Additional TMEM239 protein interactions were identified through a human interactome mapping project. Synthenein-1 (SDCBP) is involved in the trafficking of transmembrane proteins, in addition to neuro and immunomodulation, exosome biogenesis and tumorigenesis. SDCBP is regulated by TGFB1-mediated SMAD2/3. A number of other cell signaling proteins physically associated with TMEM239, including Cyclic AMP-dependent transcription factor (ATF-7), FYVE, RhoGEF and PH domain-containing protein 2 (FGD2) and Syndecan binding protein (SDCBP).

The Golgi SNAP receptor complex member 1 (GOS1) was found to associate with TMEM239. A member of the super-family of proteins called t-SNAREs, GOS1 mediates transport from the ER to the Golgi apparatus. Lastly, the protein Alpha-N-methyltransferease (TAE1) was found to interact with TMEM239. TAE1 catalyzes the methylation of alpha-amino groups of Alanine or Serine residues in [Ala/Ser]-Pro-Lys motifs and Pro-Pro-Lys motifs. TAE1 is also responsible for methylating a number of ribosomal proteins.

== Clinical significance ==
SNP rs7360412, located in the 3'UTR of TMEM239, was identified in a genome-wide association study of quantitative phenotypes for bipolar disorder as a top marker for fractional anisotropy. In this context, fractional anisotropy, as detected by diffusion tensor imaging, was used to assess white matter integrity. White matter integrity is highly heritable and reduced in both bipolar patients and their unaffected relatives.

RNA-seq was used to analyze the transcriptomes of human and Leishmania primary cutaneous lesions, in order to understand differences in host and parasitic factors influencing the progression of Localized Cutaneous Leishmaniasis (LCL) to Mucosal Leishmaniasis (ML). Decreased expression of TMEM239 in a primary cutaneous lesions indicates a higher probability of ML development.
