= FYVE domain =

FYVE zinc finger
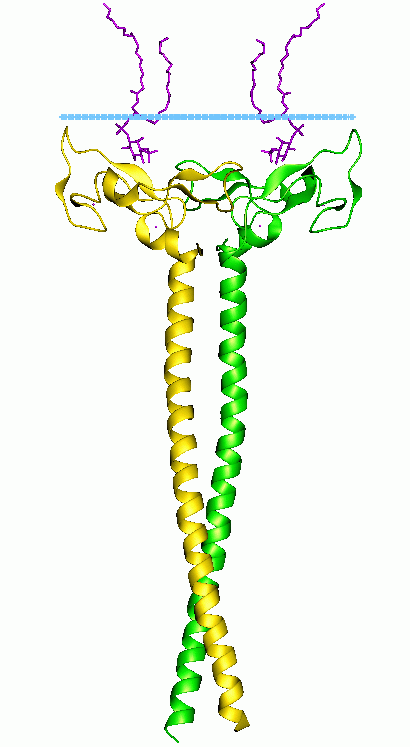
- Early endosome antigen 1 (EEA1) dimer with lipids.

Identifiers
- Symbol: FYVE
- Pfam: PF01363
- InterPro: IPR000306
- PROSITE: PDOC50178
- SCOP2: 1vfy / SCOPe / SUPFAM
- OPM superfamily: 59
- OPM protein: 1vfy
- CDD: cd00065
Available protein structures:
- Pfam: structures / ECOD
- PDB: RCSB PDB; PDBe; PDBj
- PDBsum: structure summary

In molecular biology the FYVE zinc finger domain is named after the four cysteine-rich proteins: Fab 1 (yeast orthologue of PIKfyve), YOTB, Vac 1 (vesicle transport protein), and EEA1, in which it has been found. FYVE domains bind phosphatidylinositol 3-phosphate, in a way dependent on its metal ion coordination and basic amino acids. The FYVE domain inserts into cell membranes in a pH-dependent manner. The FYVE domain has been connected to vacuolar protein sorting and endosome function.

The human genome encodes about 30 FYVE-domain proteins.

== Structure ==
The FYVE domain is composed of two small beta hairpins (or zinc knuckles) followed by an alpha helix. The FYVE finger binds two zinc ions. The FYVE finger has eight potential zinc coordinating cysteine positions and is characterized by having basic amino acids around the cysteines. Many members of this family also include two histidines in a sequence motif:

R+HHC+XCG, where + represents a charged residue and X any residue

The FYVE finger is structurally similar to the RING domain and the PHD finger.

== Examples ==
The following is a list of human proteins containing this domain:

- ANKFY1, EEA1, FGD1, FGD2, FGD3, FGD4, FGD5, FGD6, FYCO1, HGS, MTMR3, MTMR4, PIKFYVE, PLEKHF1, PLEKHF2
- RUFY1, RUFY2, RUFY3, RUFY4, WDFY1, WDFY2, WDFY3, ZFYVE1, ZFYVE9, ZFYVE16, ZFYVE19, ZFYVE20, ZFYVE21, ZFYVE26, ZFYVE27, ZFYVE28
