= ZFYVE1 =

Protein-coding gene in the species Homo sapiens

Identifiers
- Aliases: ZFYVE1, DFCP1, PPP1R172, SR3, TAFF1, ZNFN2A1, zinc finger FYVE-type containing 1
- External IDs: OMIM: 605471; MGI: 3026685; GeneCards: ZFYVE1

Gene location (Human)
Chr.	Chromosome 14 (human)
Band	14q24.2	Start	72,969,451 bp
Band	14q24.2	End	73,027,131 bp

Gene location (Mouse)
Chr.	Chromosome 12 (mouse)
Band	12|12 D1	Start	83,593,332 bp
Band	12|12 D1	End	83,643,996 bp
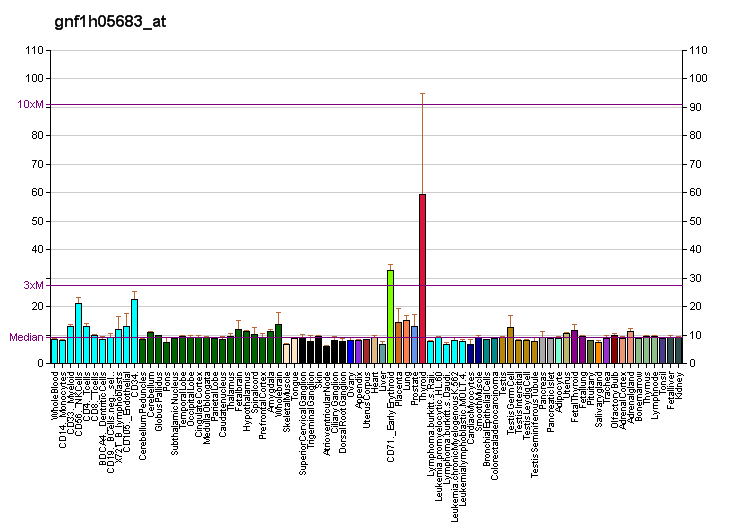
RNA expression pattern
Bgee	Human / Mouse (ortholog); Top expressed in: tibialis anterior muscle; middle temporal gyrus; amniotic fluid; mucosa of ileum; pancreatic epithelial cell; saphenous vein; deltoid muscle; endothelial cell; pars compacta; lateral nuclear group of thalamus / Top expressed in: spermatid; seminiferous tubule; granulocyte; muscle of thigh; neural layer of retina; hand; ventricular zone; left lobe of liver; spermatocyte; decidua; More reference expression data
BioGPS	More reference expression data
Gene ontology
Molecular function	zinc ion binding; 1-phosphatidylinositol binding; protein binding; phosphatidylinositol-3,4,5-trisphosphate binding; metal ion binding; phosphatidylinositol-3,4-bisphosphate binding
Cellular component	perinuclear region of cytoplasm; autophagosome; mitochondria associated membranes; Golgi stack; Golgi apparatus; extrinsic component of omegasome membrane; endoplasmic reticulum; membrane; phagophore assembly site; omegasome
Biological process	negative regulation of phosphatase activity; cellular response to starvation; macroautophagy
Sources:Amigo / QuickGO
Orthologs
Databases	NCBI: entry; OMA: entry
Species	Human	Mouse
Entrez	53349	217695
Ensembl	ENSG00000165861	ENSMUSG00000042628
UniProt	Q9HBF4	Q810J8
RefSeq (mRNA)	NM_001281734; NM_001281735; NM_021260; NM_178441	NM_183154; NM_001359166; NM_001359167; NM_001359168
RefSeq (protein)	NP_001268663; NP_001268664; NP_067083; NP_848535	NP_898977; NP_001346095; NP_001346096; NP_001346097
Location (UCSC)	Chr 14: 72.97 – 73.03 Mb	Chr 12: 83.59 – 83.64 Mb
PubMed search
- Wikidata
View/Edit Human	View/Edit Mouse

Zinc finger FYVE domain-containing protein 1 is a protein that in humans is encoded by the ZFYVE1 gene.

The FYVE domain mediates the recruitment of proteins involved in membrane trafficking and cell signaling to phosphatidylinositol 3-phosphate (PtdIns(3)P)-containing membranes. This gene encodes a protein which contains two zinc-binding FYVE domains in tandem. This protein displays a predominantly Golgi, endoplasmic reticulum and vesicular distribution. Alternatively spliced transcript variants have been found for this gene, and they encode two isoforms with different sizes.
