= Pib2 =

Yeast protein

Phosphatidylinositol 3-phosphate-binding protein 2

Identifiers
- Organism: Saccharomyces cerevisiae
- Symbol: PIB2
- Entrez: 852861
- Orthologs: NCBI: entry; OMA: entry
- RefSeq (mRNA): NM_001180888.3
- RefSeq (Prot): NP_011492.3
- UniProt: P53191

Other data
- Chromosome: VII: 0.45 - 0.45 Mb
Search for
- Structures: Swiss-model
- Domains: InterPro

Phosphatidylinositol 3-phosphate-binding protein 2 (Pib2) is a yeast protein involved in the regulation of TORC1 signaling and lysosomal membrane permeabilization. It is essential for the reactivation of TORC1 following exposure to rapamycin or nutrient starvation.

== Discovery ==
Pib2 was first identified as a FYVE domain-containing protein able to bind phosphatidylinositol 3-phosphate (PI3P). Pib2 was later identified in a screen for rapamycin sensitivity, along with several other TORC1 regulatory proteins (including Ego1, Gtr1, Gtr2, and other key TORC1 related proteins).

== Structure ==
Pib2 is a 70.6 kDa protein with 635 amino acids (Uniprot - P53191). Pib2 has 5 weakly conserved motifs among fungi and 2 universally conserved motifs. The partially conserved motifs are found in the N-terminal region of the protein and are generally referred to as regions A-E The universally conserved motifs include a phosphatidylinositol-3-phosphate (PI3P)-binding FYVE domain, and a short tail motif at the C-terminus.

=== Mammalian homologs ===
Pib2 has 2 mammalian homologs, Phafin1 (also known as LAPF or PLEKHF1) and Phafin2 (EAPF or PLEKHF2). The phafin proteins each have a PH (pleckstrin homology) domain and FYVE domain. Phafin1 also has a tail motif similar to that of Pib2. These proteins have not been shown to be involved in the regulation of mammalian TORC1 signaling but have been shown to be involved in related processes.

== Function ==
=== TORC1 regulation ===
In Saccharomyces cerevisiae, Pib2 has been shown to be involved in regulating TORC1 signaling. Pib2 is found at the yeast vacuole and endosomes. The PI3P binding FYVE domain of Pib2 is key for this localization. Pib2 also interacts with some TORC1 components, including Kog1 and Tor1, and has been shown to be necessary for TORC1 reactivation following inhibition by rapamycin or nutrient starvation. Additionally, Pib2 is essential for TORC1 reactivation by stimulation with leucine and glutamine.

In terms of TORC1 reactivation, it has been observed that Pib2 can have both a positive and negative effect. The C-terminus of Pib2 is key for TORC1 reactivation, whereas the N-terminal region has an inhibitory effect on TORC1 reactivation.

=== Lysosomal membrane permeabilization ===
Lysosomal membrane permeabilization (LMP) is a process which is important for inducing cell death in a range of animals and plants. LMP also occurs in Saccharomyces cerevisiae during sporulation. Pib2 has been implicated in the regulation of this process in stressed yeast through the promotion of TORC1 activity.
