= Dagfinn Aarskog =

Norwegian physician

- Born: 10 December 1928; Ålesund, Norway
- Died: 27 May 2014 (aged 85); Bergen, Norway
- Occupation: Physician
- Known for: Aarskog–Scott syndrome
- Awards: Knight of the Order of St. Olav

Dagfinn Aarskog (10 December 1928 – 27 May 2014) was a Norwegian physician, geneticist, and professor of pediatrics. He has been called "one of the most prominent figures in Norwegian pediatrics."

== Life ==
He was born in Ålesund, Norway. He received his MD at the University of Bergen in 1956, and received a PhD in medicine in 1965. Aarskog was a specialist in pediatrics from 1964 and in medical genetics from 1974. From 1964 to 1965, he worked as a research assistant at Johns Hopkins Hospital. Aarskog's research focused on perinatal endocrinology, calcium metabolism, growth disorders and cytogenetics, and he published over 250 articles on these topics. In 1970, he first described the condition later called Aarskog–Scott syndrome.

Aarskog was appointed professor of pediatrics at the University of Bergen. He became a senior consultant at the pediatric clinic at Haukeland Hospital in 1971. From 1988 to 1993 he was Dean of the Faculty of Medicine at the University of Bergen.

He held several international positions of trust, including president of the European Society for Paediatric Endocrinology, and was appointed a Knight of the Order of St. Olav in 1992.

He died in Bergen in 2014.
