= ANKFY1 =

Protein-coding gene in humans

Identifiers
- Aliases: ANKFY1, ANKHZN, BTBD23, ZFYVE14, ankyrin repeat and FYVE domain containing 1
- External IDs: OMIM: 607927; MGI: 1337008; GeneCards: ANKFY1

Gene location (Human)
Chr.	Chromosome 17 (human)
Band	17p13.2	Start	4,163,821 bp
Band	17p13.2	End	4,263,995 bp

Gene location (Mouse)
Chr.	Chromosome 11 (mouse)
Band	11|11 B4	Start	72,580,832 bp
Band	11|11 B4	End	72,662,972 bp
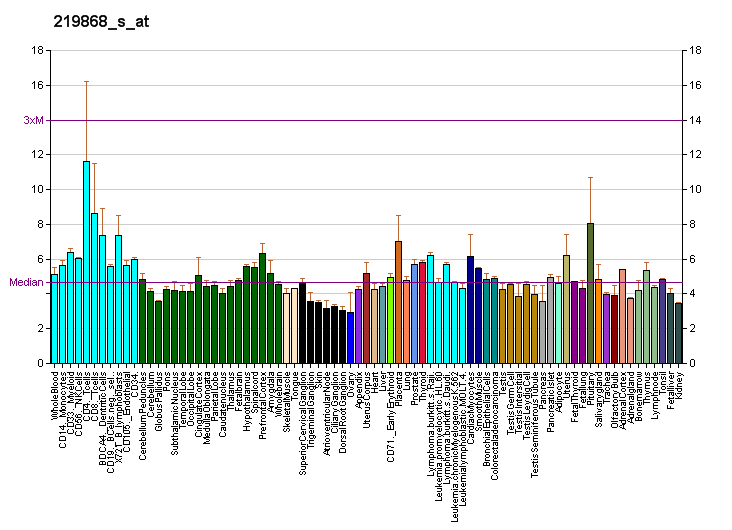
RNA expression pattern
Bgee	Human / Mouse (ortholog); Top expressed in: skin of hip; parietal pleura; visceral pleura; corpus callosum; tibia; Achilles tendon; skin of thigh; palpebral conjunctiva; external globus pallidus; right hemisphere of cerebellum / Top expressed in: stroma of bone marrow; granulocyte; epithelium of stomach; corneal stroma; lactiferous gland; calvaria; lumbar spinal ganglion; mucous cell of stomach; wall of urinary bladder; mucosa of urinary bladder; More reference expression data
BioGPS	More reference expression data
Gene ontology
Molecular function	phosphatidylinositol phosphate binding; protein binding; metal ion binding
Cellular component	cytoplasm; macropinosome; retromer complex; lysosomal membrane; early endosome; endosome membrane; extracellular exosome; membrane; cytosol; endosome; intracellular membrane-bounded organelle
Biological process	positive regulation of pinocytosis; endosomal vesicle fusion; retrograde transport, endosome to Golgi; endocytosis; Golgi to lysosome transport; endosomal transport
Sources:Amigo / QuickGO
Orthologs
Databases	NCBI: entry; OMA: entry
Species	Human	Mouse
Entrez	51479	11736
Ensembl	ENSG00000185722	ENSMUSG00000020790
UniProt	Q9P2R3	Q810B6
RefSeq (mRNA)	NM_001257999; NM_016376; NM_020740; NM_001330063	NM_009671
RefSeq (protein)	NP_001244928; NP_001316992; NP_057460	NP_033801
Location (UCSC)	Chr 17: 4.16 – 4.26 Mb	Chr 11: 72.58 – 72.66 Mb
PubMed search
- Wikidata
View/Edit Human	View/Edit Mouse

Ankyrin repeat and FYVE domain-containing protein 1 is a protein that in humans is encoded by the ANKFY1 gene.

== Function ==
This gene encodes a cytoplasmic protein that contains a coiled-coil structure and a BTB/POZ domain at its N-terminus, ankyrin repeats in the middle portion, and a FYVE-finger motif at its C-terminus. This protein belongs to a subgroup of double zinc finger proteins which may be involved in vesicle or protein transport. Alternative splicing has been observed at this locus and two variants, each encoding a distinct isoform, have been identified.
