= Coiled-coil domain containing 166 =

Protein found in humans

CCDC166

Identifiers
- Aliases: CCDC166, coiled-coil domain containing 166
- External IDs: MGI: 1925902; HomoloGene: 109421; GeneCards: CCDC166; OMA:CCDC166 - orthologs

Gene location (Human)
Chr.	Chromosome 8 (human)
Band	8q24.3	Start	143,706,694 bp
Band	8q24.3	End	143,708,109 bp

Gene location (Mouse)
Chr.	Chromosome 15 (mouse)
Band	15|15 D3	Start	75,851,721 bp
Band	15|15 D3	End	75,854,304 bp
RNA expression pattern
Bgee	Human / Mouse (ortholog); Top expressed in: left testis; right testis; developmental structure; prefrontal cortex; ganglionic eminence; Brodmann area 9; skin of abdomen; human musculoskeletal system; skeletal muscle; muscle of leg / Top expressed in: interventricular septum; spermatid; otic vesicle; saccule; embryo; epithelium of lens; seminiferous tubule; neural tube; neural layer of retina; islet of Langerhans; More reference expression data
BioGPS	n/a
Orthologs
Species	Human	Mouse
Entrez	100130274	223648
Ensembl	ENSG00000255181; ENSG00000278749	ENSMUSG00000098176
UniProt	P0CW27	n/a
RefSeq (mRNA)	NM_001162914	NM_001163518; NM_146059
RefSeq (protein)	NP_001156386	n/a
Location (UCSC)	Chr 8: 143.71 – 143.71 Mb	Chr 15: 75.85 – 75.85 Mb
PubMed search
- Wikidata
View/Edit Human	View/Edit Mouse

Coiled-coil domain containing 166 is a protein that in humans is encoded by the CCDC166 gene. Its function is currently unknown. It contains a coiled-coil domain, hence the current origin of its name. It is primarily expressed in the testes.

== Gene ==
The gene currently is known to contain only two exons, and one isoform. This primary transcript consists of 1320 DNA base pairs. Its location is on chromosome 8q24.3, between positions 143706694-143708109, on the + strand. The gene is located near BREA2 and MAPK15.

== Transcripts ==
The gene has only a single transcript, due to only have two exons, both which are always transcribed. The coding portion of the mRNA is 1320 nucleotides. In tissues found to express the transcript for this gene it is typically found in low levels.

== Protein ==
CCDC166 has only one isoform in humans, which has a molecular weight of 48.7 kDa and is composed of 439 amino acids. The pI of the protein is 10.537. The protein has several amino acid repeat structures including; EREA, VQSL and (T)QLLH, all of which are conserved in mammals. The composition of the protein reveals that it is high in serine, lysine, and arginine. The protein contains three conserved domains including a coiled-coil domain between amino acids 27-74, a domain of unknown function between amino acids 72-260, and a serine-rich domain between amino acids 288-410. It is believed that the 26-115 AA region is a SH3 domain. The structure is mainly composed of alpha-helices that form a larger coiled-coil. It also contains several coiled-coils.

CCDC166
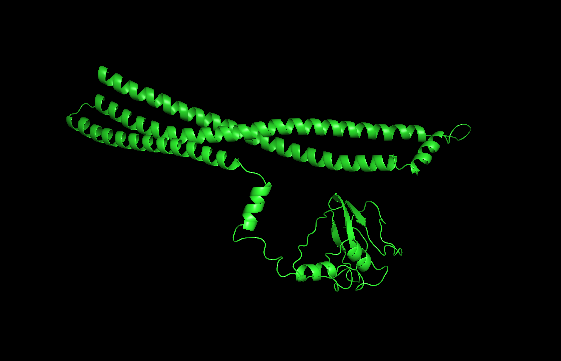
- Proposed structure of CCDC166

== Gene level regulation ==
The gene seems to be expressed heavily in the testes, and this may be conserved in evolution. The promoter region contains several conserved transcription factor binding sites. Notably among them are the CREB family, KLFs, and perhaps the most telling of which is the presence of Testis-determining factor. These transcription factors are all important during the process of development.

== Transcript level regulation ==
In situ hybridization (ISH) data has found the gene's mRNAs are mostly found in the nucleus of Sertoli cells, with low expression in Leydig cells. The gene has also been found in other germ cell tumors. In addition the gene's primary transcript contains several miRNA binding sites, including: hsa-miR-2278, hsa-miR-3178, and hsa-miR-4516.

== Protein level regulation ==
CCDC166 is predicted to be regulated by SUMO protein. It has a conserved IKAD sequence at amino acid 220-223. This combined with a conserved nuclear localization signal of PKKKR starting at amino acid 3, supports that this protein is imported into the nucleus. The gene also contains several predicted phosphorylation sites, most of which are predicted to be clustered into the serine-rich domain. The occurrences of highest probability occur at serine 10, serine 308, and serine 391.

== Homology / evolution ==
While the current function of the gene is unknown, many mammals possess on ortholog of the gene. In various primate species studies, several species have been found to possess on orthologous gene that shares 90% sequence identity. While the gene does not seem to have paralogs, it has homologs that have been conserved throughout its evolutionary history. Evidence that its function has been conserved comes from the promoter region, which has predicted SRY-transcription factors binding sites conserved from zebrafish all the way to humans.

"Evolutionary History of CCDC166"
Species	Gene name	Date of divergence	Percent similarity	Accession number
Human	CCDC166	0 MYA	100%	NP_001156386.1
Chimpanzees	CCDC166 isoform 1	6.65 MYA	98%	PNI46222.1
Grey mouse lemur	CCDC166	74 MYA	76%	XP_017516497.1
Horse	CCDC166	96 MYA	85%	XP_023504891.1
Florida manatee	CCDC166	105 MYA	79%	XP_004387488.1
Japanese gecko	CCDC166-like protein	312 MYA	74%	XP_007444987.1
Mallard duck	CCDC166-like protein	312 MYA	39%	ENSAPLG00000001712
Mexican tetra	CCDC166	435 MYA	26%	ENSAMXG00000003745.1

== Function / biochemistry ==
The function of the protein is currently unknown.

Composition of CCDC166
Amino Acid	Number of Occurrences	Percent Composition
Ala (A)	57	13.0%
Arg (R)	58	13.2%
Asn (N)	5	1.1%
Asp (D)	15	3.4%
Cys (C)	2	0.5%
Gln (Q)	32	7.3%
Glu (E)	36	8.2%
Gly (G)	21	4.8%
His (H)	12	2.7%
Ile (I)	6	1.4%
Leu (L)	56	12.8%
Lys (K)	11	2.5%
Met (M)	6	1.4%
Phe (F)	4	0.9%
Pro (P)	26	5.9%
Ser (S)	47	10.7%
Thr (T)	12	2.7%
Trp (W)	3	0.7%
Tyr (Y)	5	1.1%
Val (V)	25	5.7%

== Interactions ==
The gene has been found to interact with FAT3, a tumor suppressor gene, as well as INTS2 a gene that is involved in snRNA processing and transcription. Expression of CCDC166 has shown to be affected by methylphenidate, but the mechanism of this interaction is not known.

== Clinical significance ==
CCDC166 has some single nucleotide variants that are associated with lung, liver colon, thyroid pancreatic and testicular cancers. The clinical significance of the protein has not been fully characterized as of yet, however.
