= FGD4 =

Protein-coding gene in humans

Identifiers
- Aliases: FGD4, CMT4H, FRABP, ZFYVE6, FYVE, RhoGEF and PH domain containing 4
- External IDs: OMIM: 611104; MGI: 2183747; GeneCards: FGD4

Gene location (Human)
Chr.	Chromosome 12 (human)
Band	12p11.21	Start	32,399,558 bp
Band	12p11.21	End	32,646,050 bp

Gene location (Mouse)
Chr.	Chromosome 16 (mouse)
Band	16|16 A2- A3	Start	16,234,781 bp
Band	16|16 A2- A3	End	16,418,413 bp
RNA expression pattern
Bgee	Human / Mouse (ortholog); Top expressed in: jejunal mucosa; Achilles tendon; mucosa of ileum; retinal pigment epithelium; pancreatic epithelial cell; trabecular bone; visceral pleura; mucosa of paranasal sinus; lower lobe of lung; Skeletal muscle tissue of biceps brachii / Top expressed in: epithelium of small intestine; retinal pigment epithelium; pineal gland; interventricular septum; granulocyte; Epithelium of choroid plexus; ciliary body; iris; epithelium of stomach; Rostral migratory stream; More reference expression data
BioGPS	n/a
Gene ontology
Molecular function	metal ion binding; small GTPase binding; actin binding; guanyl-nucleotide exchange factor activity
Cellular component	cytoplasm; cytosol; Golgi apparatus; cell projection; filopodium; ruffle; cytoskeleton; lamellipodium
Biological process	regulation of GTPase activity; filopodium assembly; cytoskeleton organization; regulation of cell shape; positive regulation of apoptotic process; regulation of Rho protein signal transduction; regulation of small GTPase mediated signal transduction; actin cytoskeleton organization; G protein-coupled receptor signaling pathway
Sources:Amigo / QuickGO
Orthologs
Databases	NCBI: entry; OMA: entry
Species	Human	Mouse
Entrez	121512	224014
Ensembl	ENSG00000139132	ENSMUSG00000022788
UniProt	Q96M96; Q49A55	Q91ZT5
RefSeq (mRNA)	NM_001304480; NM_001304481; NM_001304483; NM_001304484; NM_139241 NM_001330373; NM_001330374; NM_001370297; NM_001370298; NM_001384126; NM_001384127; NM_001384128; NM_001384130; NM_001384131; NM_001384132; NM_001385118	NM_001301817; NM_001301818; NM_139232; NM_139233; NM_139234
RefSeq (protein)	NP_001291409; NP_001291410; NP_001291412; NP_001291413; NP_001317302 NP_001317303; NP_640334; NP_001357226; NP_001357227; NP_001371055; NP_001371056; NP_001371057; NP_001371059; NP_001371060; NP_001371061; NP_001291412.1	NP_001288746; NP_001288747; NP_631978
Location (UCSC)	Chr 12: 32.4 – 32.65 Mb	Chr 16: 16.23 – 16.42 Mb
PubMed search
- Wikidata
View/Edit Human	View/Edit Mouse

FYVE, RhoGEF and PH domain-containing protein 4 is a protein encoded in humans by the FGD4 gene.

== See also ==
- FYVE, RhoGEF and PH domain containing
  - FYVE domain (zinc finger domain)
  - RhoGEF domain (with guanine nucleotide exchange factor activity)
  - PH domain (pleckstrin homology domain)
