= FYVE, RhoGEF and PH domain containing =

FYVE, RhoGEF and PH domain containing (FGD) is a gene family consisting of:

- FGD1
- FGD2
- FGD3
- FGD4

Type 1 is associated with Aarskog-Scott syndrome.

== See also ==
- Guanine nucleotide exchange factor
  - RhoGEF
