= Shawl scrotum =

- Other names: Overriding scrotum
- Specialty: Urology
- Causes: Genetic- Associated with other conditions which cause body dysmorphisms

Shawl scrotum is a condition in which the scrotum surrounds the penis, resembling a 'shawl'. Also referred to as "overriding scrotum," it is one of the physical characteristics of Aarskog–Scott syndrome, Fine–Lubinsky syndrome, and other genetic diseases.
