= RUFY1 =

Protein-coding gene in humans

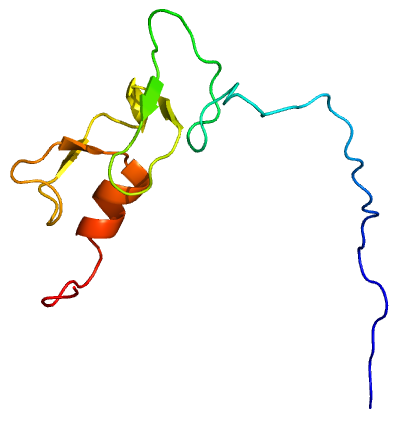

Identifiers
- Aliases: RUFY1, RABIP4, ZFYVE12, RUN and FYVE domain containing 1
- External IDs: OMIM: 610327; MGI: 2429762; GeneCards: RUFY1
Available structures
PDB	Ortholog search: PDBe RCSB
PDB	List of PDB id codes 2YQM, 2YW8

Gene location (Human)
Chr.	Chromosome 5 (human)
Band	5q35.3	Start	179,550,554 bp
Band	5q35.3	End	179,610,012 bp

Gene location (Mouse)
Chr.	Chromosome 11 (mouse)
Band	11|11 B1.3	Start	50,280,113 bp
Band	11|11 B1.3	End	50,321,952 bp
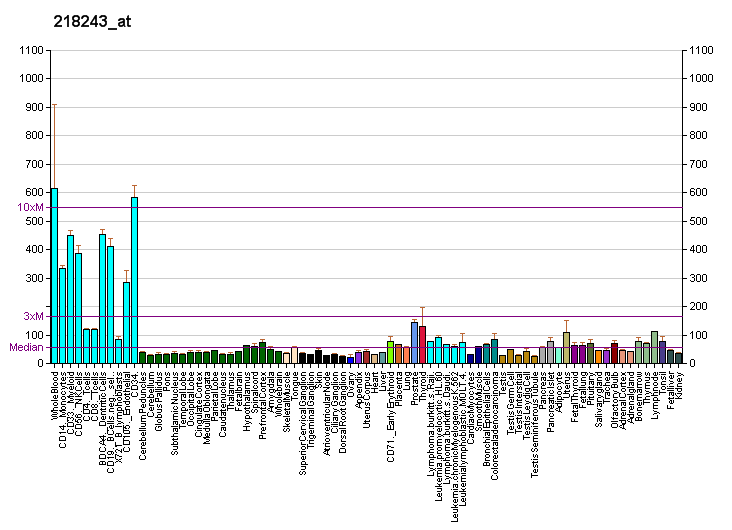
RNA expression pattern
Bgee	Human / Mouse (ortholog); Top expressed in: monocyte; Achilles tendon; sural nerve; corpus callosum; ventricular zone; blood; right uterine tube; gastric mucosa; granulocyte; skin of leg / Top expressed in: primary oocyte; neural layer of retina; right kidney; granulocyte; muscle of thigh; zygote; transitional epithelium of urinary bladder; proximal tubule; retinal pigment epithelium; secondary oocyte; More reference expression data
BioGPS	More reference expression data
Gene ontology
Molecular function	protein binding; metal ion binding; lipid binding; SH3 domain binding; SH2 domain binding
Cellular component	intracellular membrane-bounded organelle; membrane; cytoplasm; cytosol; nuclear speck; early endosome membrane; endosome; nucleus
Biological process	protein transport; endocytosis; phosphatidylinositol biosynthetic process; regulation of endocytosis; small GTPase mediated signal transduction
Sources:Amigo / QuickGO
Orthologs
Databases	NCBI: entry; OMA: entry
Species	Human	Mouse
Entrez	80230	216724
Ensembl	ENSG00000284260; ENSG00000176783	ENSMUSG00000020375
UniProt	Q96T51	Q8BIJ7
RefSeq (mRNA)	NM_001040451; NM_001040452; NM_025158	NM_172557
RefSeq (protein)	NP_001035541; NP_001035542; NP_079434	NP_766145
Location (UCSC)	Chr 5: 179.55 – 179.61 Mb	Chr 11: 50.28 – 50.32 Mb
PubMed search
- Wikidata
View/Edit Human	View/Edit Mouse

RUN and FYVE domain-containing protein 1 is a protein that in humans is encoded by the RUFY1 gene. It is named after the RUN and FYVE domains it contains.

== Interactions ==
RUFY1 has been shown to interact with BMX.
