= FGD3 =

Protein-coding gene in the species Homo sapiens

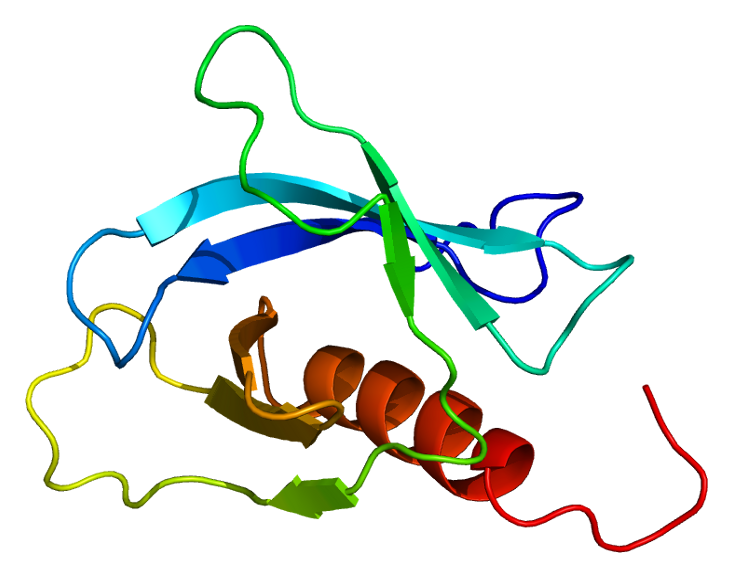

Identifiers
- Aliases: FGD3, ZFYVE5, FYVE, RhoGEF and PH domain containing 3
- External IDs: OMIM: 617554; MGI: 1353657; GeneCards: FGD3
Available structures
PDB	Ortholog search: PDBe RCSB
PDB	List of PDB id codes 2COC

Gene location (Human)
Chr.	Chromosome 9 (human)
Band	9q22.31	Start	92,947,523 bp
Band	9q22.31	End	93,036,236 bp

Gene location (Mouse)
Chr.	Chromosome 13 (mouse)
Band	13 A5|13 25.18 cM	Start	49,415,030 bp
Band	13 A5|13 25.18 cM	End	49,473,787 bp
RNA expression pattern
Bgee	Human / Mouse (ortholog); Top expressed in: granulocyte; blood; thymus; monocyte; spleen; bone marrow cell; trabecular bone; pancreatic ductal cell; lymph node; appendix / Top expressed in: granulocyte; gastrula; yolk sac; embryo; thymus; visual cortex; dentate gyrus of hippocampal formation granule cell; cerebellar cortex; primary visual cortex; submandibular gland; More reference expression data
BioGPS	n/a
Gene ontology
Molecular function	metal ion binding; small GTPase binding; guanyl-nucleotide exchange factor activity
Cellular component	cytoplasm; cytosol; Golgi apparatus; ruffle; cytoskeleton; lamellipodium
Biological process	regulation of GTPase activity; filopodium assembly; cytoskeleton organization; regulation of cell shape; positive regulation of apoptotic process; regulation of Rho protein signal transduction; regulation of small GTPase mediated signal transduction; actin cytoskeleton organization; G protein-coupled receptor signaling pathway
Sources:Amigo / QuickGO
Orthologs
Databases	NCBI: entry; OMA: entry
Species	Human	Mouse
Entrez	89846	30938
Ensembl	ENSG00000127084	ENSMUSG00000037946
UniProt	Q5JSP0	O88842
RefSeq (mRNA)	NM_001083536; NM_001286993; NM_033086; NM_001369951; NM_001369952	NM_015759
RefSeq (protein)	NP_001077005; NP_001273922; NP_149077; NP_001356880; NP_001356881 NP_001077005.1; NP_149077.2	n/a
Location (UCSC)	Chr 9: 92.95 – 93.04 Mb	Chr 13: 49.42 – 49.47 Mb
PubMed search
- Wikidata
View/Edit Human	View/Edit Mouse

FYVE, RhoGEF and PH domain-containing protein 3 is a protein that in humans is encoded by the FGD3 gene.

== See also ==
- FYVE, RhoGEF and PH domain containing
  - FYVE domain (zinc finger domain)
  - RhoGEF domain (with guanine nucleotide exchange factor activity)
  - PH domain (pleckstrin homology domain)
