= FGD2 =

Protein-coding gene in the species Homo sapiens

Identifiers
- Aliases: FGD2, ZFYVE4, FYVE, RhoGEF and PH domain containing 2
- External IDs: OMIM: 605091; MGI: 1347084; GeneCards: FGD2

Gene location (Human)
Chr.	Chromosome 6 (human)
Band	6p21.2	Start	37,005,646 bp
Band	6p21.2	End	37,029,069 bp

Gene location (Mouse)
Chr.	Chromosome 17 (mouse)
Band	17 15.26 cM|17 A3.3	Start	29,360,914 bp
Band	17 15.26 cM|17 A3.3	End	29,379,661 bp
RNA expression pattern
Bgee	Human / Mouse (ortholog); Top expressed in: monocyte; spleen; granulocyte; epithelium of nasopharynx; internal globus pallidus; lymph node; buccal mucosa cell; blood; trabecular bone; cardia / Top expressed in: otic vesicle; saccule; spleen; granulocyte; blood; otic placode; islet of Langerhans; stroma of bone marrow; mesenteric lymph nodes; epiblast; More reference expression data
BioGPS	n/a
Gene ontology
Molecular function	phosphatidylinositol phosphate binding; metal ion binding; small GTPase binding; protein binding; guanyl-nucleotide exchange factor activity
Cellular component	cytoplasm; cytosol; endosome; Golgi apparatus; cell projection; early endosome membrane; membrane; ruffle; plasma membrane; ruffle membrane; early endosome; cytoskeleton; nucleus; lamellipodium
Biological process	positive regulation of JUN kinase activity; regulation of GTPase activity; filopodium assembly; cytoskeleton organization; regulation of cell shape; positive regulation of apoptotic process; regulation of Rho protein signal transduction; regulation of small GTPase mediated signal transduction; actin cytoskeleton organization; G protein-coupled receptor signaling pathway
Sources:Amigo / QuickGO
Orthologs
Databases	NCBI: entry; OMA: entry
Species	Human	Mouse
Entrez	221472	26382
Ensembl	ENSG00000146192	ENSMUSG00000024013
UniProt	Q7Z6J4	Q8BY35
RefSeq (mRNA)	NM_173558	NM_001159538; NM_013710
RefSeq (protein)	NP_775829	NP_001153010; NP_038738
Location (UCSC)	Chr 6: 37.01 – 37.03 Mb	Chr 17: 29.36 – 29.38 Mb
PubMed search
- Wikidata
View/Edit Human	View/Edit Mouse

FYVE, RhoGEF and PH domain-containing protein 2 (FGD2), also known as zinc finger FYVE domain-containing protein 4 (ZFYVE4), is a protein that in humans is encoded by the FGD2 gene.

It is a member of the FYVE, RhoGEF and PH domain containing family.

== See also ==
- FYVE domain (zinc finger domain)
- RhoGEF domain (with guanine nucleotide exchange factor activity)
- PH domain (pleckstrin homology domain)
