= ZFYVE28 =

Protein-coding gene in the species Homo sapiens

Identifiers
- Aliases: ZFYVE28, LST2, LYST2, zinc finger FYVE-type containing 28, lst-2
- External IDs: OMIM: 614176; MGI: 2684992; GeneCards: ZFYVE28

Gene location (Human)
Chr.	Chromosome 4 (human)
Band	4p16.3	Start	2,269,582 bp
Band	4p16.3	End	2,418,651 bp

Gene location (Mouse)
Chr.	Chromosome 5 (mouse)
Band	5|5 B2	Start	34,352,237 bp
Band	5|5 B2	End	34,445,793 bp
RNA expression pattern
Bgee	Human / Mouse (ortholog); Top expressed in: right hemisphere of cerebellum; granulocyte; right frontal lobe; Brodmann area 9; mucosa of transverse colon; anterior cingulate cortex; testicle; nucleus accumbens; body of stomach; prefrontal cortex / Top expressed in: neural layer of retina; cerebellar cortex; lumbar spinal ganglion; superior frontal gyrus; lobe of cerebellum; cerebellar vermis; piriform cortex; olfactory tubercle; primary visual cortex; dentate gyrus of hippocampal formation granule cell; More reference expression data
BioGPS	n/a
Gene ontology
Molecular function	protein binding; phosphatidylinositol-3-phosphate binding; metal ion binding
Cellular component	cytoplasm; cytosol; endosome; early endosome membrane; membrane
Biological process	negative regulation of epidermal growth factor-activated receptor activity; negative regulation of epidermal growth factor receptor signaling pathway
Sources:Amigo / QuickGO
Orthologs
Databases	NCBI: entry; OMA: entry
Species	Human	Mouse
Entrez	57732	231125
Ensembl	ENSG00000159733	ENSMUSG00000037224
UniProt	Q9HCC9	Q6ZPK7
RefSeq (mRNA)	NM_001172656; NM_001172657; NM_001172658; NM_001172659; NM_001172660 NM_020972	NM_001015039
RefSeq (protein)	NP_001166127; NP_001166128; NP_001166129; NP_001166130; NP_001166131 NP_066023	NP_001015039
Location (UCSC)	Chr 4: 2.27 – 2.42 Mb	Chr 5: 34.35 – 34.45 Mb
PubMed search
- Wikidata
View/Edit Human	View/Edit Mouse

Zinc finger FYVE-type containing 28 is a protein that in humans is encoded by the ZFYVE28 gene.
