= FUNDC2 =

Protein-coding gene in humans

Identifiers
- Aliases: FUNDC2, DC44, HCBP6, HCC3, PD03104, FUN14 domain containing 2
- External IDs: MGI: 1914641; HomoloGene: 88538; GeneCards: FUNDC2; OMA:FUNDC2 - orthologs

Gene location (Human)
Chr.	X chromosome (human)
Band	Xq28	Start	155,025,980 bp
Band	Xq28	End	155,060,304 bp

Gene location (Mouse)
Chr.	X chromosome (mouse)
Band	X|X A7.3	Start	74,426,005 bp
Band	X|X A7.3	End	74,440,065 bp
RNA expression pattern
Bgee	Human / Mouse (ortholog); Top expressed in: apex of heart; muscle of thigh; gastrocnemius muscle; right auricle of heart; body of pancreas; left ovary; right ovary; ganglionic eminence; muscle layer of sigmoid colon; left uterine tube / Top expressed in: fossa; endocardial cushion; atrioventricular valve; condyle; sternocleidomastoid muscle; temporal muscle; endothelial cell of lymphatic vessel; blood; digastric muscle; triceps brachii muscle; More reference expression data
BioGPS	n/a
Orthologs
Species	Human	Mouse
Entrez	65991	67391
Ensembl	ENSG00000165775	ENSMUSG00000031198
UniProt	Q9BWH2	Q9D6K8
RefSeq (mRNA)	NM_023934	NM_026126
RefSeq (protein)	NP_076423	NP_080402
Location (UCSC)	Chr X: 155.03 – 155.06 Mb	Chr X: 74.43 – 74.44 Mb
PubMed search
- Wikidata
View/Edit Human	View/Edit Mouse

FUN14 domain-containing protein 2 is a protein that in humans is encoded by the FUNDC2 gene.
