= SGSM2 =

Protein-coding gene in the species Homo sapiens

Identifiers
- Aliases: SGSM2, RUTBC1, small G protein signaling modulator 2
- External IDs: OMIM: 611418; MGI: 2144695; GeneCards: SGSM2

Gene location (Human)
Chr.	Chromosome 17 (human)
Band	17p13.3	Start	2,337,498 bp
Band	17p13.3	End	2,381,058 bp

Gene location (Mouse)
Chr.	Chromosome 11 (mouse)
Band	11|11 B5	Start	74,740,087 bp
Band	11|11 B5	End	74,787,886 bp
RNA expression pattern
Bgee	Human / Mouse (ortholog); Top expressed in: pancreatic ductal cell; tail of epididymis; endothelial cell; pituitary gland; corpus epididymis; anterior pituitary; right frontal lobe; amygdala; nucleus accumbens; cingulate gyrus / Top expressed in: dentate gyrus of hippocampal formation granule cell; superior frontal gyrus; primary visual cortex; median eminence; arcuate nucleus; subiculum; anterior amygdaloid area; globus pallidus; olfactory tubercle; primary motor cortex; More reference expression data
BioGPS	n/a
Gene ontology
Molecular function	GTPase activator activity
Cellular component	endomembrane system; cytoplasm; melanosome
Biological process	late endosome to Golgi transport; positive regulation of GTPase activity; activation of GTPase activity; regulation of vesicle fusion; intracellular protein transport
Sources:Amigo / QuickGO
Orthologs
Databases	NCBI: entry; OMA: entry
Species	Human	Mouse
Entrez	9905	97761
Ensembl	ENSG00000141258	ENSMUSG00000038351
UniProt	O43147	Q80U12
RefSeq (mRNA)	NM_001098509; NM_014853; NM_001346700	NM_197943; NM_001374688
RefSeq (protein)	NP_001091979; NP_001333629; NP_055668	NP_922934; NP_001361617
Location (UCSC)	Chr 17: 2.34 – 2.38 Mb	Chr 11: 74.74 – 74.79 Mb
PubMed search
- Wikidata
View/Edit Human	View/Edit Mouse

Small G protein signaling modulator 2 is a protein that in humans is encoded by the SGSM2 gene.

== Clinical relevance ==
In a recent genome-wide association study, this gene has been associated with fasting glucose traits, type 2 diabetes and obesity.
