= PLEKHF2 =

Protein-coding gene in the species Homo sapiens

Identifiers
- Aliases: PLEKHF2, EAPF, PHAFIN2, ZFYVE18, pleckstrin homology and FYVE domain containing 2
- External IDs: OMIM: 615208; MGI: 1919051; GeneCards: PLEKHF2

Gene location (Human)
Chr.	Chromosome 8 (human)
Band	8q22.1	Start	95,133,785 bp
Band	8q22.1	End	95,156,685 bp

Gene location (Mouse)
Chr.	Chromosome 4 (mouse)
Band	4|4 A1	Start	10,988,662 bp
Band	4|4 A1	End	11,007,927 bp
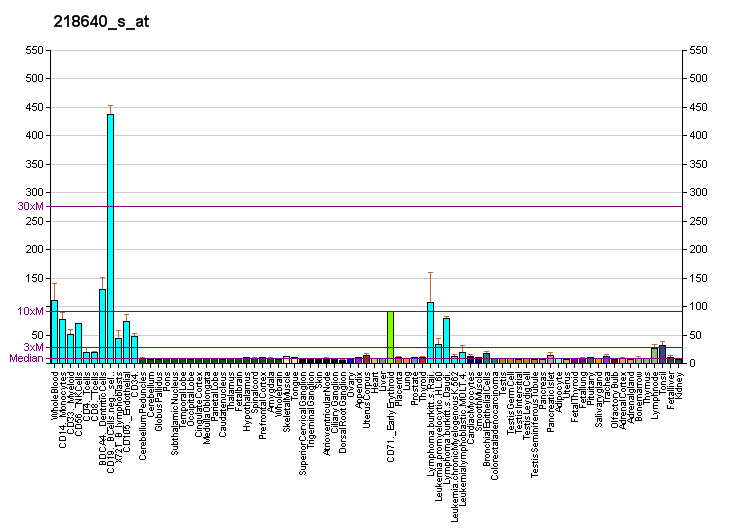
RNA expression pattern
Bgee	Human / Mouse (ortholog); Top expressed in: secondary oocyte; skin of thigh; palpebral conjunctiva; bronchial epithelial cell; skin of hip; monocyte; sperm; bone marrow; corpus epididymis; olfactory zone of nasal mucosa / Top expressed in: granulocyte; right kidney; neural layer of retina; yolk sac; spermatocyte; morula; proximal tubule; endocardial cushion; lip; atrioventricular valve; More reference expression data
BioGPS	More reference expression data
Gene ontology
Molecular function	protein binding; metal ion binding; phosphatidylinositol binding
Cellular component	endosome; early endosome membrane; transport vesicle; endoplasmic reticulum; membrane
Biological process	protein transport
Sources:Amigo / QuickGO
Orthologs
Databases	NCBI: entry; OMA: entry
Species	Human	Mouse
Entrez	79666	71801
Ensembl	ENSG00000175895	ENSMUSG00000049969
UniProt	Q9H8W4	Q91WB4
RefSeq (mRNA)	NM_024613	NM_175175
RefSeq (protein)	NP_078889	NP_780384
Location (UCSC)	Chr 8: 95.13 – 95.16 Mb	Chr 4: 10.99 – 11.01 Mb
PubMed search
- Wikidata
View/Edit Human	View/Edit Mouse

Pleckstrin homology domain-containing family F member 2 is a protein that in humans is encoded by the PLEKHF2 gene.
