= EEA1 =

Protein-coding gene in humans

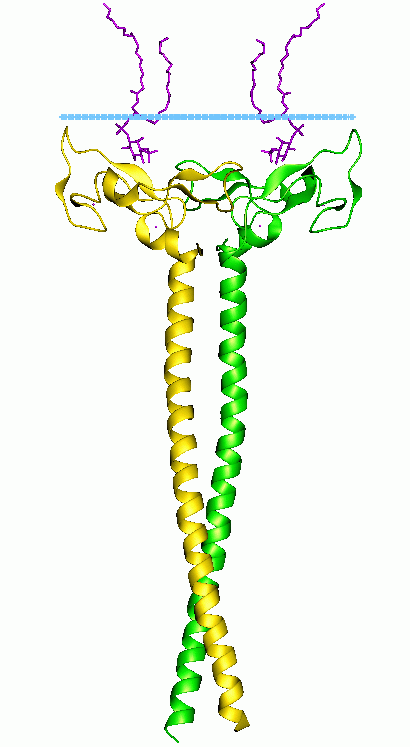

Identifiers
- Aliases: EEA1, MST105, MSTP105, ZFYVE2, early endosome antigen 1
- External IDs: OMIM: 605070; MGI: 2442192; GeneCards: EEA1
Available structures
PDB	Ortholog search: PDBe RCSB
PDB	List of PDB id codes 1HYI, 1HYJ, 1JOC, 3MJH

Gene location (Human)
Chr.	Chromosome 12 (human)
Band	12q22	Start	92,770,637 bp
Band	12q22	End	92,929,331 bp

Gene location (Mouse)
Chr.	Chromosome 10 (mouse)
Band	10|10 C2	Start	95,776,512 bp
Band	10|10 C2	End	95,881,380 bp
RNA expression pattern
Bgee	Human / Mouse (ortholog); Top expressed in: Achilles tendon; skin of thigh; biceps brachii; oral cavity; gingival epithelium; Skeletal muscle tissue of rectus abdominis; tail of epididymis; human penis; skin of hip; Skeletal muscle tissue of biceps brachii / Top expressed in: zygote; stroma of bone marrow; secondary oocyte; skin of external ear; cardiac muscle tissue of left ventricle; plantaris muscle; extensor digitorum longus muscle; soleus muscle; left colon; paraventricular nucleus of hypothalamus; More reference expression data
BioGPS	n/a
Gene ontology
Molecular function	protein homodimerization activity; zinc ion binding; metal ion binding; calmodulin binding; GTP-dependent protein binding; 1-phosphatidylinositol binding; protein binding; nucleic acid binding
Cellular component	cytoplasm; recycling endosome; cytosol; endosome; early endosome membrane; membrane; axonal spine; serine-pyruvate aminotransferase complex; early endosome; extrinsic component of plasma membrane; extracellular exosome; cytoplasmic vesicle; presynapse; synapse
Biological process	endocytosis; early endosome to late endosome transport; synaptic vesicle to endosome fusion; vesicle fusion
Sources:Amigo / QuickGO
Orthologs
Databases	NCBI: entry; OMA: entry
Species	Human	Mouse
Entrez	8411	216238
Ensembl	ENSG00000102189	ENSMUSG00000036499
UniProt	Q15075	Q8BL66
RefSeq (mRNA)	NM_003566	NM_001001932
RefSeq (protein)	NP_003557	NP_001001932
Location (UCSC)	Chr 12: 92.77 – 92.93 Mb	Chr 10: 95.78 – 95.88 Mb
PubMed search
- Wikidata
View/Edit Human	View/Edit Mouse

The gene EEA1 encodes for the 1400 amino acid protein, Early Endosome Antigen 1.

EEA1 localizes exclusively to early endosomes and has an important role in endosomal trafficking. EEA1 binds directly to the phospholipid phosphatidylinositol 3-phosphate through its C-terminal FYVE domain and forms a homodimer through a coiled coil. EEA1 acts as a tethering molecule that couples vesicle docking with SNAREs such as N-ethylmaleimide sensitive fusion protein, bringing the endosomes physically closer and ultimately resulting in the fusion and delivery of endosomal cargo.

== Function ==
EEA1 is a RAB5A effector protein which binds via an N-terminal zinc finger domain and is required for fusion of early and late endosomes and for sorting at the early endosome level.

EEA1 plays a role in endocytosis and is recruited by Rab5-GTP to endosomal membranes. EEA1 may be regulated through monoubiquitination, affecting endosome fusion and trafficking. Ubiquitin selective segregase p97 may regulate EEA1's tethering ability, affecting its endosome trafficking and morphology.

== Involvement in pathogenesis ==
Due to the proteins importance in vesicular trafficking, a number of intracellular bacteria prevent EEA1 recruitment to the vacuole. Mycobacterium tuberculosis is known to inhibit the recruitment of EEA1 to the phagosomal membrane through CamKII. Legionella pneumophila also prevents EEA1 recruitment through a currently unknown mechanism. The related pathogen Legionella longbeachae recruits EEA1 and appears to replicate within a modified early endosome.

== See also ==
- endosome
- Phosphatidylinositol 3-phosphate
- FYVE domain
