= MTMR3 =

Protein-coding gene in the species Homo sapiens

Identifiers
- Aliases: MTMR3, FYVE-DSP1, ZFYVE10, myotubularin related protein 3
- External IDs: OMIM: 603558; MGI: 1921552; GeneCards: MTMR3
Enzyme activity
EC #	BRENDA	ExPASy	KEGG	MetaCyc
3.1.3.95	↗	↗	↗	↗

Gene location (Human)
Chr.	Chromosome 22 (human)
Band	22q12.2	Start	29,883,169 bp
Band	22q12.2	End	30,030,868 bp

Gene location (Mouse)
Chr.	Chromosome 11 (mouse)
Band	11|11 A1	Start	4,430,868 bp
Band	11|11 A1	End	4,544,863 bp
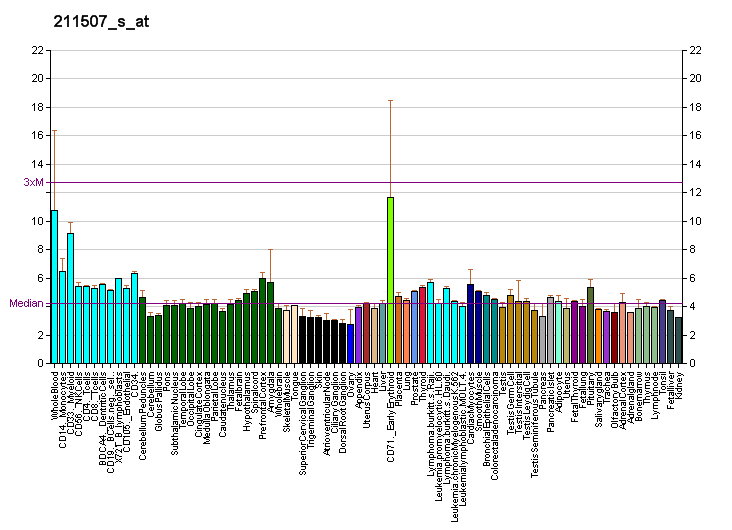

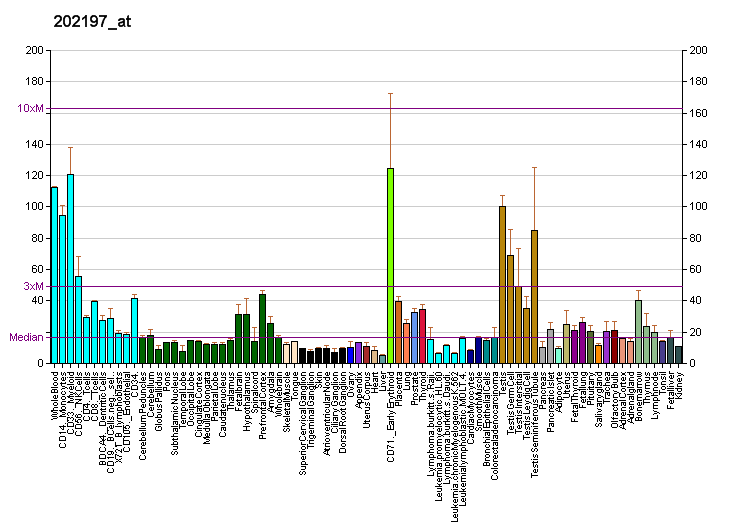

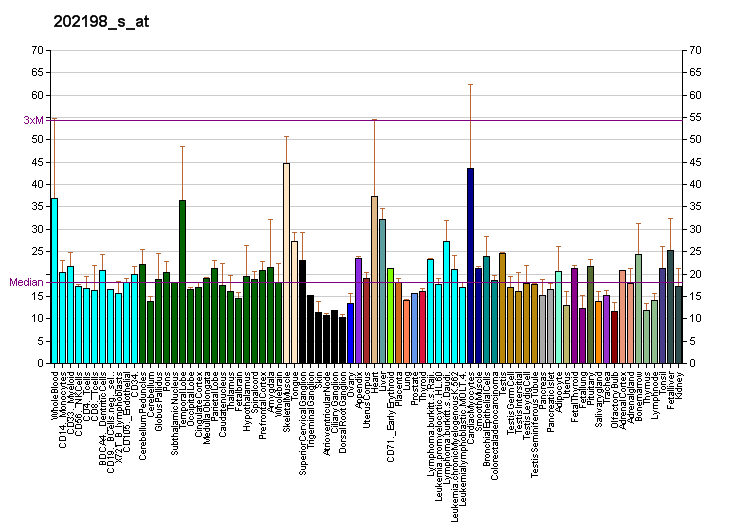
RNA expression pattern
Bgee	Human / Mouse (ortholog); Top expressed in: oocyte; secondary oocyte; blood; bone marrow cell; right uterine tube; skin of leg; monocyte; sural nerve; Achilles tendon; amniotic fluid / Top expressed in: blood; vestibular membrane of cochlear duct; granulocyte; transitional epithelium of urinary bladder; ciliary body; facial motor nucleus; ankle; iris; substantia nigra; epithelium of lens; More reference expression data
BioGPS	More reference expression data
Gene ontology
Molecular function	phosphoprotein phosphatase activity; metal ion binding; protein tyrosine phosphatase activity; hydrolase activity; protein binding; protein serine/threonine phosphatase activity; phosphatidylinositol-3-phosphatase activity; phosphatidylinositol-3,5-bisphosphate 3-phosphatase activity; protein phosphatase binding
Cellular component	cytoplasm; cytosol; membrane; extrinsic component of membrane; nucleoplasm
Biological process	cellular response to glucose starvation; lipid metabolism; protein dephosphorylation; regulation of autophagosome assembly; phosphatidylinositol dephosphorylation; phosphatidylinositol biosynthetic process; macroautophagy; dephosphorylation; peptidyl-tyrosine dephosphorylation; phosphatidylinositol 5-phosphate metabolic process; regulation of phosphatidylinositol dephosphorylation
Sources:Amigo / QuickGO
Orthologs
Databases	NCBI: entry; OMA: entry
Species	Human	Mouse
Entrez	8897	74302
Ensembl	ENSG00000100330	ENSMUSG00000034354
UniProt	Q13615	Q8K296
RefSeq (mRNA)	NM_001013676; NM_021090; NM_153050; NM_153051	NM_028860; NM_001373897
RefSeq (protein)	NP_066576; NP_694690; NP_694691; NP_694691.1	NP_083136; NP_001360826
Location (UCSC)	Chr 22: 29.88 – 30.03 Mb	Chr 11: 4.43 – 4.54 Mb
PubMed search
- Wikidata
View/Edit Human	View/Edit Mouse

Myotubularin-related protein 3 is a protein that in humans is encoded by the MTMR3 gene.

This gene encodes a member of the myotubularin dual specificity protein phosphatase gene family. The encoded protein is structurally similar to myotubularin but in addition contains a FYVE domain and an N-terminal PH-GRAM domain. The protein can self-associate and also form heteromers with another myotubularin related protein. The protein binds to phosphoinositide lipids through the PH-GRAM domain, and can hydrolyze phosphatidylinositol(3)-phosphate and phosphatidylinositol(3,5)-biphosphate in vitro. The encoded protein has been observed to have a perinuclear, possibly membrane-bound, distribution in cells, but it has also been found free in the cytoplasm. Multiple transcript variants encoding different isoforms have been found for this gene.
