= BREA2 =

Non-coding RNA in the species Homo sapiens

LINC02878

Identifiers
- Aliases: LINC02878, breast cancer estrogen-induced apoptosis 2, BREA2, long intergenic non-protein coding RNA 2878
- External IDs: GeneCards: LINC02878; OMA:LINC02878 - orthologs
Orthologs
Species	Human	Mouse
Entrez	286076	n/a
Ensembl	n/a	n/a
UniProt	n a	n/a
RefSeq (mRNA)	NM_001024610	n/a
RefSeq (protein)	n/a	n/a
Location (UCSC)	n/a	n/a
PubMed search		n/a
- Wikidata
View/Edit Human

Breast cancer estrogen-induced apoptosis 2 is a protein that in humans is encoded by the BREA2 gene.
