= SGSM1 =

Protein-coding gene in the species Homo sapiens

Identifiers
- Aliases: SGSM1, RUTBC2, small G protein signaling modulator 1
- External IDs: OMIM: 611417; MGI: 107320; GeneCards: SGSM1

Gene location (Human)
Chr.	Chromosome 22 (human)
Band	22q11.23	Start	24,806,169 bp
Band	22q11.23	End	24,927,578 bp

Gene location (Mouse)
Chr.	Chromosome 5 (mouse)
Band	5 F|5 55.45 cM	Start	113,391,086 bp
Band	5 F|5 55.45 cM	End	113,458,652 bp
RNA expression pattern
Bgee	Human / Mouse (ortholog); Top expressed in: cardiac muscle tissue of right atrium; Brodmann area 23; middle temporal gyrus; superior frontal gyrus; postcentral gyrus; entorhinal cortex; hypothalamus; cerebellar hemisphere; primary visual cortex; right hemisphere of cerebellum / Top expressed in: superior cervical ganglion; arcuate nucleus; dorsomedial hypothalamic nucleus; paraventricular nucleus of hypothalamus; median eminence; lumbar subsegment of spinal cord; ventromedial nucleus; nucleus of stria terminalis; lateral hypothalamus; suprachiasmatic nucleus; More reference expression data
BioGPS	n/a
Gene ontology
Molecular function	protein binding; GTPase activator activity
Cellular component	Golgi apparatus; membrane; cytoplasm; cytoplasmic vesicle membrane; cytosol; endomembrane system; cytoplasmic vesicle
Biological process	activation of GTPase activity; intracellular protein transport; regulation of vesicle fusion
Sources:Amigo / QuickGO
Orthologs
Databases	NCBI: entry; OMA: entry
Species	Human	Mouse
Entrez	129049	52850
Ensembl	ENSG00000167037	ENSMUSG00000042216
UniProt	Q2NKQ1	Q8BPQ7
RefSeq (mRNA)	NM_133454; NM_001039948; NM_001098497; NM_001098498	NM_001162965; NM_001254731; NM_172718; NM_001309526; NM_001309528
RefSeq (protein)	NP_001035037; NP_001091967; NP_001091968; NP_597711	NP_001156437; NP_001241660; NP_001296455; NP_001296457; NP_766306
Location (UCSC)	Chr 22: 24.81 – 24.93 Mb	Chr 5: 113.39 – 113.46 Mb
PubMed search
- Wikidata
View/Edit Human	View/Edit Mouse

Small G protein signaling modulator 1 (SGSM1) also known as RUN and TBC1 domain-containing protein 2 (RUTBC2) and nurr1-interacting protein (NuIP) is a protein in humans that is encoded by the SGSM1 gene.
