= ZFYVE19 =

Protein-coding gene in the species Homo sapiens

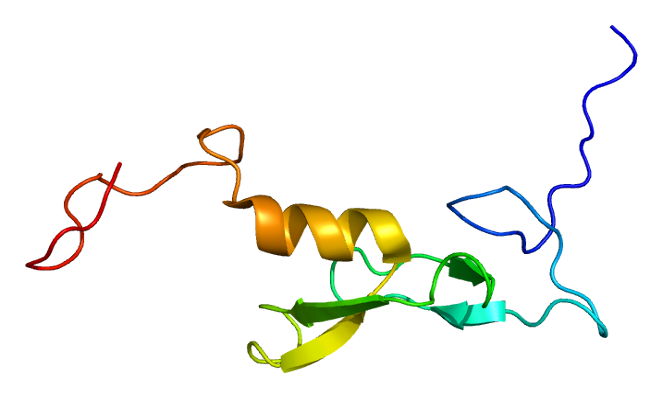

Identifiers
- Aliases: ZFYVE19, ANCHR, MPFYVE, zinc finger FYVE-type containing 19, PFIC9
- External IDs: MGI: 1919258; GeneCards: ZFYVE19
Available structures
PDB	Ortholog search: PDBe RCSB
PDB	List of PDB id codes 1WFK, 2D8V

Gene location (Human)
Chr.	Chromosome 15 (human)
Band	15q15.1	Start	40,807,086 bp
Band	15q15.1	End	40,815,084 bp

Gene location (Mouse)
Chr.	Chromosome 2 (mouse)
Band	2|2 E5	Start	119,039,098 bp
Band	2|2 E5	End	119,047,530 bp
RNA expression pattern
Bgee	Human / Mouse (ortholog); Top expressed in: mucosa of transverse colon; C1 segment; granulocyte; apex of heart; right lobe of liver; minor salivary glands; right uterine tube; right hemisphere of cerebellum; gonad; gallbladder / Top expressed in: crypt of lieberkuhn of small intestine; genital tubercle; fetal liver hematopoietic progenitor cell; proximal tubule; right kidney; yolk sac; spermatocyte; transitional epithelium of urinary bladder; tail of embryo; duodenum; More reference expression data
BioGPS	n/a
Gene ontology
Molecular function	protein binding; phosphatidylinositol-3-phosphate binding; metal ion binding; lipid binding
Cellular component	cytoplasm; microtubule organizing center; centrosome; cleavage furrow; cytoskeleton; midbody; Flemming body
Biological process	cell cycle; negative regulation of cytokinesis; abscission; cell division; mitotic cytokinesis checkpoint signaling
Sources:Amigo / QuickGO
Orthologs
Databases	NCBI: entry; OMA: entry
Species	Human	Mouse
Entrez	84936	72008
Ensembl	ENSG00000166140	ENSMUSG00000068580
UniProt	Q96K21	Q9DAZ9
RefSeq (mRNA)	NM_001077268; NM_001258420; NM_001258421; NM_032850	NM_001164827; NM_028054
RefSeq (protein)	NP_001070736; NP_001245349; NP_001245350; NP_116239	NP_001158299; NP_082330
Location (UCSC)	Chr 15: 40.81 – 40.82 Mb	Chr 2: 119.04 – 119.05 Mb
PubMed search
- Wikidata
View/Edit Human	View/Edit Mouse

Zinc finger FYVE domain-containing protein 19 is a protein that in humans is encoded by the ZFYVE19 gene.
