= Phosphatidylinositol 3-phosphate =

Names
- Other names sn-1-stearoyl-2-arachidonoyl phosphatidylinositol 3-phosphate

Identifiers
Abbreviations	PtdIns3P; PtdIns(3)P; PI3P; PI(3)P
PubChem CID	6857403
CompTox Dashboard (EPA)	DTXSID701343991

Properties
Chemical formula	C_{11}H_{20}O_{16}P_{2}
Molar mass	470.214 g/mol, neutral with fatty acid composition - 18:0, 20:4
- Except where otherwise noted, data are given for materials in their standard state (at 25 °C [77 °F], 100 kPa). verify (what is ?) Infobox references

Phosphatidylinositol 3-phosphate (PI3P) is a phospholipid found in cell membranes that helps to recruit a range of proteins, many of which are involved in protein trafficking, to the membranes. It is the product of both the class II and III phosphoinositide 3-kinases (PI 3-kinases) activity on phosphatidylinositol.

PtdIns3P is dephosphorylated by the myotubularin family of phosphatases, on the D3 position of the inositol ring, and can be converted to PtdIns(3,5)P_{2} by the lipid kinase PIKfyve.

Both FYVE domains and PX domains – found in proteins such as SNX1, HGS, and EEA1 – bind to PtdIns3P.

The majority of PtdIns3P appears to be constitutively synthesised by the class III PI 3-kinase, PIK3C3 (Vps34), at endocytic membranes. Class II PI 3-kinases also appear to synthesise PtdIns3P, their activity however appears to be regulated by a range of stimuli, including growth factors. This suggests that specific pools of PtdIns3P may be synthesised upon cell stimulation.

== See also ==
- Phosphatidylinositol 3-phosphate-binding protein 2
