= Actin-binding protein =

Class of proteins

Actin-binding proteins (also known as ABPs) are proteins that bind to actin. This may mean ability to bind actin monomers, or polymers, or both.

Many actin-binding proteins, including α-actinin, β-spectrin, dystrophin, utrophin and fimbrin, do this through the actin-binding calponin homology domain.

This is a list of actin-binding proteins in alphabetical order.

== 0–9 ==
- 25kDa
- 25kDa ABP from aorta
- 30akDA
- 30bkDa
- 34kDA
- 45kDa
- 110 kD dimer ABP
- 110 kD (Drebrin)
- p53
- p58gag
- p185neu
- p116rip

== A ==
- a-actinin
- Abl
- ABLIM
- Actin-Interacting MAPKKK Ssk2p
- ABP120
- ABP140
- Abp1p
- ABP280 (Filamin)
- ABP50 (EF-1a)
- Acan 125 (Carmil)
- ActA
- Actibind
- Actin
- Actinfilin
- Actinogelin
- Actin-regulating kinases
- Actin-Related Proteins
- Actobindin
- Actolinkin
- Actopaxin
- Actophorin
- Acumentin (= L-plastin)
- Adducin
- ADF/Cofilin
- Adseverin (scinderin)
- Afadin
- AFAP-110
- Affixin
- Aginactin
- AIP1
- Aldolase
- Angiogenin
- Anillin
- Annexins
- Aplyronine
- Archvillin (isoform of Supervillin)
- Arginine kinase
- Arp2/3 complex

== B ==
- Band 4.1
- Band 4.9 (Dematin)
- b-actinin
- b-Cap73
- Bifocal
- Bistramide A
- BPAG1
- Brevin (Gelsolin)

== C ==
- c-Abl
- Calpactin (Annexin)
- CHO1
- Cortactin
- CamKinase II
- Calponin
- Chondramide
- Cortexillin
- CAP
- Caltropin
- CH-ILKBP
- CPb3
- Cap100
- Calvasculin
- Ciboulot
- Coactosin
- CAP23
- CARMIL
- Acan125
- Cingulin
- Cytovillin (Ezrin)
- CapZ/Capping Protein
- a-Catenin
- Cofilin
- CR16
- Caldesmon
- CCT
- Comitin
- Calicin
- Centuarin
- Coronin

== D ==
- DBP40
- Drebrin
- Dematin (Band 4.9)
- Dynacortin
- Destrin (ADF/cofilin)
- Dystonins
- Diaphanous
- Dystroglycan
- DNase I
- Dystrophin
- Doliculide
- Dolastatins

== E ==
- EAST
- Endossin
- EF-1a (ABP50)
- Eps15
- EF-1b
- EPLIN
- EF-2
- Epsin
- EGF receptor
- ERK
- ENC-1
- ERM proteins (ezrin, radixin, moesin, plus merlin)
- END3p
- Ezrin (the E of ERM protein family)

== F ==
- F17R
- Fodrin (spectrin)
- Fascin
- Formins
- Fessilin
- Frabin
- FHL3
- Fragmin
- Fhos
- Filamin-A
- Fimbrin (plastin)

== G ==
- GAP43
- Glycogenins
- Gas2
- G-proteins
- Gastrin-Binding Protein
- Gelactins I-IV
- Gelsolins
- Girdin
- Glucokinase

== H ==
- Harmonin b
- Hrp36
- Hexokinase
- Hrp65-2
- Hectochlorin
- HS1 (actin binding protein)
- Helicase II
- Hsp27
- HIP1 (Huntingtin Interacting protein 1)
- Hsp70
- Histactophilin
- Hsp90
- Histidine rich protein II
- Hsp100

== I ==
- Inhibitor of apoptosis (IAP)
- Insertin
- Interaptin
- IP3Kinase A (Inositol 1,4,5-trisphosphate 3-kinase A)
- IQGAP
- Integrins

== J ==
- Jaspisamide A
- Jasplakinolide

== K ==
- Kabiramide C
- Kaptin
- Kettin
- Kelch protein

== L ==
- 5-Lipoxygenase
- Limatin
- Lim Kinases
- Lim Proteins
- L-plastin
- Lymphocyte Specific Protein 1 (LSP1)

== M ==
- MACF1
- MacMARKS
- Mena
- Myopodin
- MAP1A
- Merlin (related to the ERM proteins)
- Myosins
- MAP-1C
- Metavinculin
- Moesin (the M of ERM proteins)
- Myosin light chain kinase
- MAL
- Mip-90
- Myosin Light Chain A1
- MARKS
- MIM
- MAYP
- Mycalolide (a macroglide drug)
- Mayven
- Myelin basic protein

== N ==
- Naphthylphthalamic acid binding protein (NPA) N-RAP
- Nebulin
- N-WASP
- Neurabin
- Nullo
- Neurexins
- Neurocalcin
- Nexillin

== O ==
- OYE2

== P ==
- Palladin
- Plastin
- p30
- PAK (p21-activated Kinase)
- Plectin
- p47PHOX
- Parvin (actopaxin)
- Prefoldin
- p53
- PASK (Proline, Alanine rich Ste20 related Kinase)
- Presenilin I
- p58
- Phalloidin (not a protein; a small cyclic peptide)
- Profilin
- p185neu
- Ponticulin
- Protein kinase C
- Porin
- P.IB
- Prk1p (actin regulating kinase)

== R ==
- Radixin (the R of ERM proteins)
- Rapsyn
- Rhizopodin
- RPL45
- RTX toxin (Vibrio cholerae)
- RVS 167

== S ==
- Sac6
- Sla1p
- Srv2 (CAP)
- S-adenosyl-L-homocysteine hydrolase, (SAHH)
- Sla2p
- Synaptopodin
- Scinderin (adseverin)
- Synapsins
- Scruin
- Spectrin
- Severin
- Spectraplakins
- SVSII
- Shot (Short stop)
- Spire
- Shroom
- Smitin (Smooth Musc.Titin)
- Supervillin
- SipA
- Smoothelin
- Sucrose synthetase
- SipC
- Sra-1
- Spinophilin
- Ssk2p
- Swinholide

== T ==
- Talin protein
- Toxophilin
- Twinfilin
- Tau
- Trabeculin
- Twinstar
- TCP-1
- Transgelin
- Transgelin 2
- Transgelin 3
- Tensin
- Tropomodulin
- Thymosin
- Tropomyosin
- Titin
- Troponin
- TOR2
- Tubulin bIV

== U ==
- Ulapualide
- Utrophin
- Unc-87
- Unc-60 (ADF/cofilins)

== V ==
- VASP
- Vav
- Verprolin
- VDAC
- Vibrio cholerae RTX toxin
- Villin
- Vinculin
- Vitamin D-binding protein

== W ==
- WIP
- WASp

== Y ==
- Y-box proteins
- YpkA (YopO)

== Z ==
- Zipper protein
- Zo-1
- Zyxin

== See also ==
- Cytoskeletal drugs
