= Villin-1 =

Actin-binding protein

VIL1

Identifiers
- Aliases: VIL1, D2S1471, VIL, villin 1
- External IDs: OMIM: 193040; MGI: 98930; GeneCards: VIL1
Available structures
PDB	Ortholog search: PDBe RCSB
PDB	List of PDB id codes 1UNC, 3FG7

Gene location (Human)
Chr.	Chromosome 2 (human)
Band	2q35	Start	218,419,121 bp
Band	2q35	End	218,453,295 bp

Gene location (Mouse)
Chr.	Chromosome 1 (mouse)
Band	1 C3|1 38.54 cM	Start	74,448,535 bp
Band	1 C3|1 38.54 cM	End	74,474,718 bp
RNA expression pattern
Bgee	Human / Mouse (ortholog); Top expressed in: jejunal mucosa; mucosa of ileum; mucosa of transverse colon; rectum; duodenum; mucosa of sigmoid colon; buccal mucosa cell; gallbladder; secondary oocyte; islet of Langerhans / Top expressed in: ileum; intestinal villus; epithelium of small intestine; Ileal epithelium; crypt of lieberkuhn of small intestine; colon; left colon; duodenum; jejunum; Paneth cell; More reference expression data
BioGPS	n/a
Gene ontology
Molecular function	lysophosphatidic acid binding; calcium ion binding; protein homodimerization activity; cysteine-type endopeptidase inhibitor activity involved in apoptotic process; actin filament binding; protein binding; identical protein binding; actin binding; phosphatidylinositol-4,5-bisphosphate binding
Cellular component	cytoplasm; cell projection; filopodium; ruffle; plasma membrane; nucleoplasm; microvillus; filopodium tip; brush border; actin filament bundle; extracellular exosome; cytoskeleton; lamellipodium
Biological process	negative regulation of cysteine-type endopeptidase activity involved in apoptotic process; actin nucleation; positive regulation of lamellipodium morphogenesis; cytoplasmic actin-based contraction involved in cell motility; epithelial cell differentiation; epidermal growth factor receptor signaling pathway; response to bacterium; positive regulation of cell migration; cellular response to hepatocyte growth factor stimulus; actin filament depolymerization; actin filament severing; barbed-end actin filament capping; positive regulation of epithelial cell migration; regulation of lamellipodium morphogenesis; terminal web assembly; cellular response to epidermal growth factor stimulus; actin filament polymerization; regulation of wound healing; cytoskeleton organization; actin filament capping; regulation of cell shape; positive regulation of multicellular organism growth; intestinal D-glucose absorption; positive regulation of actin filament bundle assembly; regulation of microvillus length; regulation of actin nucleation; positive regulation of actin filament depolymerization; apoptotic process; positive regulation of protein localization to plasma membrane; protein-containing complex assembly
Sources:Amigo / QuickGO
Orthologs
Databases	NCBI: entry; OMA: entry
Species	Human	Mouse
Entrez	7429	22349
Ensembl	ENSG00000127831	ENSMUSG00000026175
UniProt	P09327	Q62468
RefSeq (mRNA)	NM_007127	NM_009509
RefSeq (protein)	NP_009058	NP_033535
Location (UCSC)	Chr 2: 218.42 – 218.45 Mb	Chr 1: 74.45 – 74.47 Mb
PubMed search
- Wikidata
View/Edit Human	View/Edit Mouse

Villin-1

Identifiers
- Symbol: VIL1
- Alt. symbols: VIL
- NCBI gene: 7429
- HGNC: 12690
- OMIM: 193040
- RefSeq: NM_007127
- UniProt: P09327

Other data
- Locus: Chr. 2 q35-q36
Search for
- Structures: Swiss-model
- Domains: InterPro

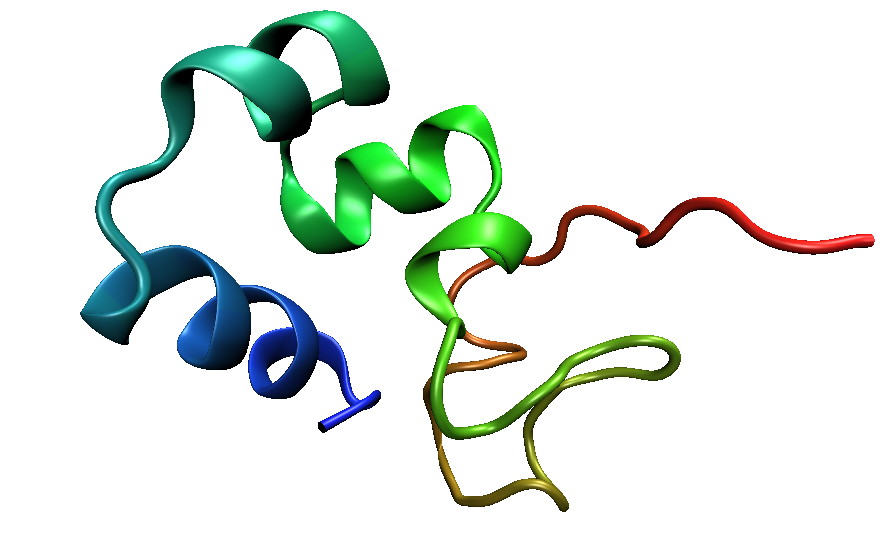
The helix bundle in the headpiece domain of chicken villin.

Villin-1 is a 92.5 kDa tissue-specific actin-binding protein associated with the actin core bundle of the brush border. Villin-1 is encoded by the VIL1 gene. Villin-1 contains multiple gelsolin-like domains capped by a small (8.5 kDa) "headpiece" at the C-terminus consisting of a fast and independently folding three-helix bundle that is stabilized by hydrophobic interactions. The headpiece domain is a commonly studied protein in molecular dynamics due to its small size and fast folding kinetics and short primary sequence.

== Expression ==
Villin-1 is an actin binding protein expressed mainly in the brush border of the epithelium in vertebrates but sometimes it is ubiquitously expressed in protists and plants. Villin is found localized in the microvilli of the brush border of the epithelium lining of the gut and renal tubules in vertebrates.

== Structure ==
Villin-1 consists of seven domains: six homologous domains that form the N-terminal core and a seventh domain that forms the C-terminal headpiece (cap). The core comprises approximately 150 amino acid residues organized into six repeated segments, while the C-terminal headpiece is an 87-residue hydrophobic region. Villin contains three phosphatidylinositol 4,5-bisphosphate (PIP_{2}) binding sites, one in the headpiece and two in the core domain.

The C-terminal headpiece (HP67) is a compact, independently folded 70-amino-acid domain that contains the principal F-actin-binding site. Residues K38, E39, K65, K70–K73, G74, L75, and F76 surround a hydrophobic core and are believed to contribute to F-actin binding. Residues E39 and K70 form a buried salt bridge linking the N- and C-terminal regions of the headpiece, which appears to stabilize the conformation required for actin binding, as disruption of this interaction abolishes binding. Residue W64 forms a conserved hydrophobic cap that is characteristic of the villin family, beneath which lies a crown of alternating positively and negatively charged residues.

The C-terminal subdomain of the headpiece, designated VHP35, is stabilized in part by a buried cluster of three phenylalanine residues. Its small size and high α-helical content promote rapid folding, a property that has been confirmed experimentally. The related Arabidopsis thaliana villin-4 C-terminal construct VHP76 exhibits increased affinity for F-actin at elevated Ca^{2+} concentrations, further supporting the conserved role of the headpiece in actin binding. Overall, the headpiece adopts a simple topology of three α-helices surrounding a tightly packed hydrophobic core.

Villin-1 also undergoes post-translational modification by tyrosine phosphorylation, and can form dimers through a dimerization site located near the amino terminus of the protein.

== Function ==
Villin-1 is believed to function in the bundling, nucleation, capping and severing of actin filaments. In vertebrates, villin proteins help to support the microfilaments of the microvilli of the brush border. However, knockout mice appear to show ultra-structurally normal microvilli reminding us that the function of villin is not definitively known; it may play a role in cell plasticity through F-actin severing. The six-repeat villin core is responsible for Ca^{2+} actin severing while the headpiece is responsible for actin crosslinking and bundling (Ca independent). Villin is postulated to be the controlling protein for Ca^{2+} induced actin severing in the brush border. Ca^{2+} inhibits proteolytic cleavage of the domains of the 6 N-terminal core which inhibits actin severing. In normal mice raising Ca^{2+} levels induces the severing of actin by villin, whereas in villin knockout mice this activity does not occur in response to heightened Ca^{2+} levels. In the presence of low concentrations of Ca^{2+} the villin headpiece functions to bundle actin filaments whereas in the presence of high Ca^{2+} concentrations the N-terminal caps and severs these filaments. The association of PIP_{2} with villin inhibits the actin capping and severing action and increases actin binding at the headpiece region, possibly through structural changes in the protein. PIP_{2} increases actin bundling not only by decreasing the severing action of villin but also through dissociating capping proteins, releasing actin monomers from sequestering proteins and stimulating actin nucleation and cross linking.

== Degradation and regulation ==
Currently, it is theorized the regulation of plant villins are caused by degradation via the binding protein auxin, which targets the headpiece domain (VHP).

== Role in intestinal and liver disease ==
Villin-1 acts as a critical determinant of intestinal epithelial survival and barrier integrity. While classically defined by its cytoskeletal function (actin binding, caping and severing), it also serves as an epithelial cell-specific anti-apoptotic protein.

=== Inflammatory bowel disease (IBD) ===
In IBD (conditions such as Crohn's disease and ulcerative colitis), villin-1 expression is downregulated in the inflamed gut mucosa. This reduction correlates with the loss of tight junction proteins and Notch-1 signaling, leading to increased intestinal permeability ("leaky gut") and heightened sensitivity to cytokine-induced apoptosis.

=== Biomarker for gut barrier failure ===
Serum villin-1 was identified as a novel, non-invasive biomarker for gut barrier damage in patients with acutely decompensated (AD) cirrhosis and acute-on-chronic liver failure (ACLF). Serum villin-1 levels follow a gradient of severity, rising significantly in patients transitioning from stable decompensation to ACLF. High serum concentrations are independently associated with systemic inflammation and high 90-day mortality rates. Conversely, tissue biopsies from these patients show a depletion of Villin-1 in the duodenal mucosa, confirming an inverse relationship between tissue integrity and serum levels during severe disease states.

== See also ==
- Supervillin
