= Helix bundle =

A helix bundle is a small protein fold composed of several alpha helices that are usually nearly parallel or antiparallel to each other.

== Three-helix bundles ==
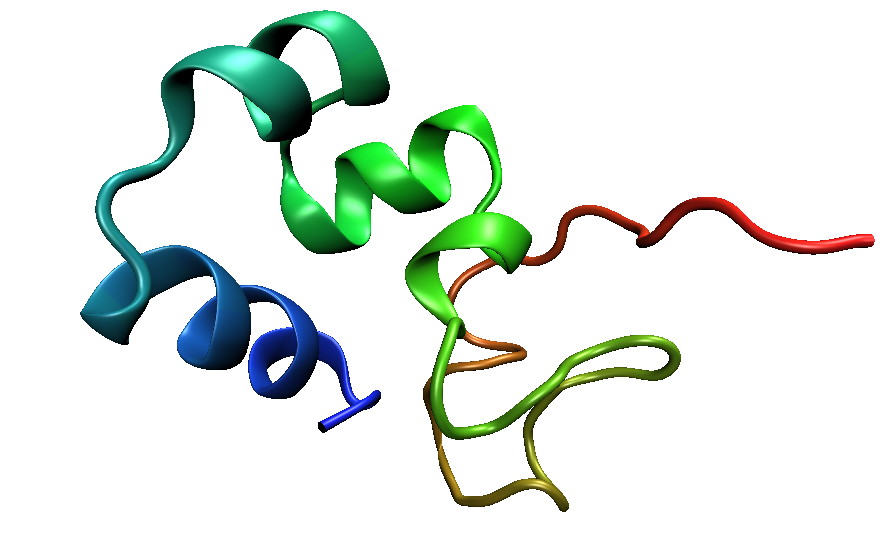
An example of the three-helix bundle fold, the headpiece domain from the protein villin as expressed in chickens (PDB ID 1QQV).

Three-helix bundles are among the smallest and fastest known cooperatively folding structural domains. The three-helix bundle in the villin headpiece domain is only 36 amino acids long and is a common subject of study in molecular dynamics simulations because its microsecond-scale folding time is within the timescales accessible to simulation. The 40-residue HIV accessory protein has a very similar fold and has also been the subject of extensive study. There is no general sequence motif associated with three-helix bundles, so they cannot necessarily be predicted from sequence alone. Three-helix bundles often occur in actin-binding proteins and in DNA-binding proteins.

== Four-helix bundles ==
Four-helix bundles typically consist of four helices packed in a coiled-coil arrangement with a sterically close-packed hydrophobic core in the center. Pairs of adjacent helices are often additionally stabilized by salt bridges between charged amino acids. The helix axes typically are oriented about 20 degrees from their neighboring helices, a much shallower incline than in the larger helical structure of the globin fold.

The specific topology of the helices is dependent on the protein – helices that are adjacent in sequence are often antiparallel, although it is also possible to arrange antiparallel links between two pairs of parallel helices. Because dimeric coiled-coils are themselves relatively stable, four-helix bundles can be dimers of coiled-coil pairs, as in the Rop protein. Four-helix bundle can have thermal stability more than 100 °C. Other important examples of four-helix bundles include cytochrome, ferritin, human growth hormone, cytokine, and Lac repressor C-terminal. The four-helix bundle fold has proven an attractive target for de novo protein design, with numerous de novo four-helix bundle proteins having been successfully designed by rational and by combinatorial methods. Although sequence is not conserved among four-helix bundles, sequence patterns tend to mirror those of coiled-coil structures in which every fourth and seventh residue is hydrophobic.

== See also ==
- Knobs into holes packing
