= Actibind =

Fungal protein

Actibind is an actin-binding fungal T(2)-RNase protein that is produced by the black mold Aspergillus niger, a microorganism used in biotechnology and food technology. In plants, actibind binds actin, a major component of the cytoskeleton, interfering with the plants' pollen tubes and halting cell growth. Research published in the journal Cancer on 15 May 2006 reports evidence that actibind has antiangiogenic and anticarcinogenic characteristics. In human colon cancer, breast cancer and melanoma, increasing the level of actibind was found to reduce the ability of these cells to form tumorogenic colonies. In animal models, increased actibind inhibited the growth of colon cancer-derived tumors, metastases and blood vessel formation. During the completion of the Human Genome Project, the gene encoding for RNaseT2, the human actibind-like protein, was found on chromosome 6.

== Why ACTIBIND? ==
The reason why ACTIBIND is an enzyme of interest in biochemical laboratories is due to the fact that researchers observed that ACTIBIND inhibits the elongation of pollen tubes by interfering with the intracellular actin network of the plant cell. The specific actin network ACTIBIND inhibits are actin rich pseudopods, which are important for a variety of cellular functions including elongation of plant pollen tubes, motility of mammalian cells, and most importantly cancer cell function. In cancer cells specifically, the actin rich pseudopods help the cancer's invasion and metastasis. Because ACTIBIND was able to interfere with actin networks in plant cells, researchers aimed to find out whether ACTIBIND could also inhibit mammalian cancer cell development.

== ACTIBIND as an Antiangiogenic ==
ACTIBIND, an extracellular ribonuclease (T2-RNase), has been researched heavily in biochemical laboratories due the enzyme's ability to efficiently hydrolyze/degrade RNA molecules. The ability to cleave off RNA molecules it what makes ACTIBIND an effective antiangiogenic. Angiogenesis is the growth of blood vessels from existing ones, and is crucial in tumor growth. rRNA synthesis stimulated by angiogenin has been identified as the main way that tumors form new blood vessels, and therefore Antiangiogenic properties aim to block the growth of these blood vessels and stop potentially blood supply to tumors therefore slowing growth. Angiogenin increases expression in breast, colorectal, gastric, pancreatic, kidney, skin, and lung cancers. ACTIBIN inhibits angiogenesis by cleaving extracellular RNA molecules that are able to bind and potentially activate tumor associated endothelial cells. ACTIBIND also intervenes in angiogenesis through competition with angiogenin. Experiments done in vivo demonstrated that cell surface actin could possibly be a target for ACTIBIND in endothelial cells, which means ACTIBIND and angiogenin would need to compete for cell surface actin. If ACTIBIIND forms with the actin first, this would block the formation of actin-angiogenin which starts angiogenin in cancer cell organization. It was suggested that ACTIBIND inhibits communication, colonies, and motility of cancer cells through extracellular substrates by binding to cell surface actin rich pseudopods and interfering with the intracellular actin network. Further research should be conducted to determine more potential anticarcinogenic and antiangiogenic effects of ACTIBIND in humans.

== ACTIBIND as an Anticarcinogenic ==
It was also proven through experiments talked about below, that ACTIBIND not only inhibits angiogenesis but apoptosis as well. Apoptosis is used by the body to eliminate unwanted cells that have been damaged beyond repair; the process of programmed cell death. Apoptosis' dysregulation can trigger irregular responses that contribute to cancer development.

== ACTIBIND Experiments in vitro ==
=== Cancer Cell Colony Formation ===
In order to determine the effects of ACTIBIND on cancer cell colony formation, a study done in 2006 grew human colon, breast, and ovarian cancer cells in flasks then plated in a medium in the presence or absence of ACTIBIND. ACTIBIND proved to seriously inhibit the formation of all cancer cells that were tested. This experiment also showed that the control plates without ACTIBIND displayed many cytoplasmic extensions, compared to the inhibited cell extension in the plates that contained ACTIBIND. This suggested to the researchers that ACTIBIND does in fact inhibit motility of mammalian cells.

=== Cancer Blood Vessel Formation ===
The ability of ACTIIND on blood vessel growth in cancer (angiogenesis) was also tested in vitro. As stated in the section above, ACTIBIND inhibits angiogenesis by cleaving extracellular RNA molecules that are able to bind and potentially activate tumor associated endothelial cells. Therefore, this experiment used a human umbilical vein endothelial cell angiogenesis assay in the presence or absence of ACTIBIND. It was determined that the assays with ACTIBIND had less formation of blood vessels in comparison to the controls.

=== Actin – ACTIBIND ===
HT-29 cells, a cell line isolated from a primary tumor commonly used in cancer research, were tested in the presence or absence of ACTIBIND for 3 days in order to see how ACTIBIND affects the intracellular Actin network of a cancer cell. In order to be able to see the microscopic actin filaments in the cell, immunostaining was used. The HT-29 cells presented different patterns of staining depending on the presence or absence of ACTIBIND. It was determined that in control cells, the actin network was observed in the middle of the cell due to the red staining. However, the ACTIBIND treated cells showed no fluorescent staining internally, indicating that the internal actin network was inhibited.

== ACTIBIND Experiments in vivo ==
=== Xenograft tumor model ===
A mouse xenograft cancer model involves transplanting a cell line derived xenograft into either immunodeficient or humanized mice. This enables an environment for growing human cancer and experimenting with treatments. This study used a HT-29 derived xenograft mouse model in athymic mice, which means the mice are immunodeficient due to a lack of thymus and T cells. All the mice were injected with viable HT-29 cells and half of the mice were given ACTIBIND daily for 42 days. Tumors would then be measured for size at the end of the experiment. The results determined that ACTIBIND significantly reduced the growth rate of HT-29 derived cancer in the epithelial tissue. This was able to be determined as cancer cells in the ACTIBIND treated tumors were isolated in compact capsules and smaller than those of the control.

=== Inhibition of human melanoma growth ===
In this study, melanoma cells were injected into athymic mice and then treated with either ACTIBIND or control every other day for 30 days. All of the mice in the control group grew tumors within 5 days of the injection of melanoma cells, in contrast to the ACTIBIND treated mice which did not show any evidence of a tumor. The first measurement was done at 16 days, where mice in the control group had tumors with a mean volume of 100mm^{3}, compared to the treated mice who had tumors with a mean zie of <10mm^{3}. The last measurement recorded revealed that the tumors in the control group mice grew up to 800mm^{3} mean volume and 100mm^{3} mean volume in the treated mice.
