= CapZ =

CapZ, also known as CAPZ, CAZ1, CAPPA1 and beta-actinin, is a capping protein that caps the barbed end of actin filaments in muscle cells.

== Structure ==
CapZ is a heterodimeric molecule, made up of an α and β subunit. The α and β subunits are similar in structure. Each subunit is divided into three domains and a shared C-terminal extension. Helix 1-3 is an N-terminal that is composed of three antiparallel helices that are arranged in an up, down, up pattern. Helix 4 is a C-terminal made up of an antiparallel β sheet which is composed of five β strands. On one side of the C-terminal, there is a shorter N-terminal helix and a long C-terminal helix. This long C-terminal helix makes up helix 5. The final helix, helix 6 differs in the α and β subunits. The β subunit is longer than the α subunit.

== Function ==
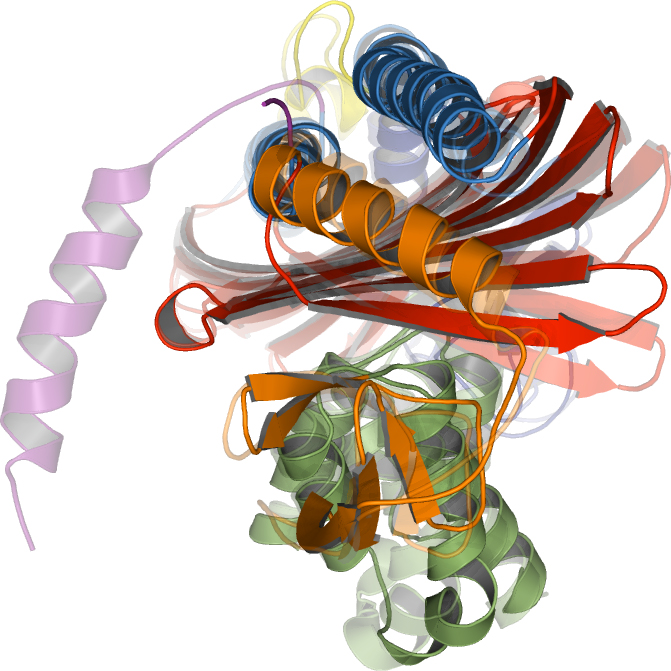
This image shows the structures of Cap32/34 superposed onto CapZ (in green) over the Cα positions of the entire CP molecules.

=== Actin stabilisation ===
The main function of CapZ is to cap the barbed (plus) end of actin filaments in muscle cells. It is located in the Z band of the muscle sarcomere. This protein helps to stabilize the actin filaments protecting it from assembly and disassembly. The activity regulation of this protein can be done by other regulatory proteins that bind to the actin filaments blocking the CapZ, hence allowing assembly.

=== Cell signalling ===
CapZ is known to play a role in cell signaling, as it regulates PKC activity in cardiac cells.

=== Cell movement ===
CapZ plays a role in cell movement (cell crawling) by controlling the lengths of the microfilaments. When CapZ is inhibited by regulating factors, microfilament polymerization or depolymerization occurs allowing lamellipodia and filopodia to grow out or retract. This polymerization and depolymerization gives the cell the appearance of crawling. When CapZ binds, it halts both of these processes.

== Regulation ==
Experimentation on chicken muscles have indicated that there are certain proteins that inhibit CapZ from binding. This includes PIP2 and other phospholipids. These molecules bind to CapZ itself to prevent it from binding to actin. However, introduction of certain detergents (in this case Triton X 100) prevent the binding of these molecules to CapZ; in turn allowing it to bind to the microfilament. Competition for actin binding sites can also regulate CapZ binding, as seen with filament elongation factors. These factors include ENA/VASP (enabled/vasodilator-stimulated phosphoprotein). CapZ is not regulated by calcium or calmodulin, as seen with other capping proteins, such as Gelsolin.

== Clinical significance ==
=== Cardiac health ===
A modest reduction in cardiac CapZ protein protects hearts against acute ischemia-reperfusion injury.

== Genes ==
- CAPZA1
- CAPZA2
- CAPZA3
- CAPZB
