= LDOC1 =

Protein-coding gene in the species Homo sapiens

Identifiers
- Aliases: LDOC1, BCUR1, Mar7, Mart7, leucine zipper, down-regulated in cancer 1, regulator of NFKB signaling, SIRH7, RTL7, LDOC1 regulator of NFKB signaling
- External IDs: OMIM: 300402; MGI: 2685212; GeneCards: LDOC1

Gene location (Human)
Chr.	X chromosome (human)
Band	Xq27.1	Start	141,111,605 bp
Band	Xq27.1	End	141,177,129 bp

Gene location (Mouse)
Chr.	X chromosome (mouse)
Band	X|X A6	Start	60,753,103 bp
Band	X|X A6	End	60,754,561 bp
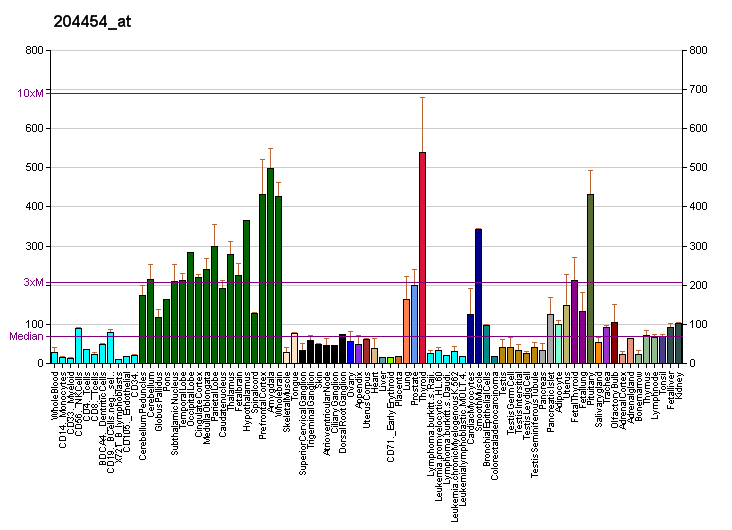
RNA expression pattern
Bgee	Human / Mouse (ortholog); Top expressed in: Descending thoracic aorta; ascending aorta; right coronary artery; popliteal artery; tibial arteries; anterior pituitary; prefrontal cortex; left coronary artery; right frontal lobe; dorsolateral prefrontal cortex / Top expressed in: lumbar subsegment of spinal cord; facial motor nucleus; embryo; embryo; blastocyst; cerebellar cortex; substantia nigra; yolk sac; anterior horn of spinal cord; decidua; More reference expression data
BioGPS	More reference expression data
Gene ontology
Molecular function	protein binding
Cellular component	nucleus; nucleolus
Biological process	maternal placenta development; maternal process involved in parturition; regulation of growth hormone activity; negative regulation of cell population proliferation; cellular response to lipopolysaccharide; cellular response to muramyl dipeptide
Sources:Amigo / QuickGO
Orthologs
Databases	NCBI: entry; OMA: entry
Species	Human	Mouse
Entrez	23641	434784
Ensembl	ENSG00000182195	ENSMUSG00000057615
UniProt	O95751	Q7TPY9
RefSeq (mRNA)	NM_012317	NM_001018087
RefSeq (protein)	NP_036449	NP_001018097
Location (UCSC)	Chr X: 141.11 – 141.18 Mb	Chr X: 60.75 – 60.75 Mb
PubMed search
- Wikidata
View/Edit Human	View/Edit Mouse

Protein LDOC1 is a protein that in humans is encoded by the LDOC1 gene.

== Function ==
The protein encoded by this gene contains a leucine zipper-like motif and a proline-rich region that shares marked similarity with an SH3-binding domain. The protein localizes to the nucleus and is down-regulated in some cancer cell lines. It is thought to regulate the transcriptional response mediated by the nuclear factor kappa B (NF-kappaB). The gene has been proposed as a tumor suppressor gene whose protein product may have an important role in the development and/or progression of some cancers.

== Interactions ==
LDOC1 has been shown to interact with ABLIM1.
