= SCIN =

Protein-coding gene in the species Homo sapiens

Identifiers
- Aliases: SCIN, scinderin
- External IDs: OMIM: 613416; MGI: 1306794; GeneCards: SCIN
Available structures
PDB	Ortholog search: PDBe RCSB
PDB	List of PDB id codes 3FG6, 5A1K, 5A1M

Gene location (Human)
Chr.	Chromosome 7 (human)
Band	7p21.3	Start	12,570,577 bp
Band	7p21.3	End	12,660,182 bp

Gene location (Mouse)
Chr.	Chromosome 12 (mouse)
Band	12|12 B1	Start	40,109,768 bp
Band	12|12 B1	End	40,184,227 bp
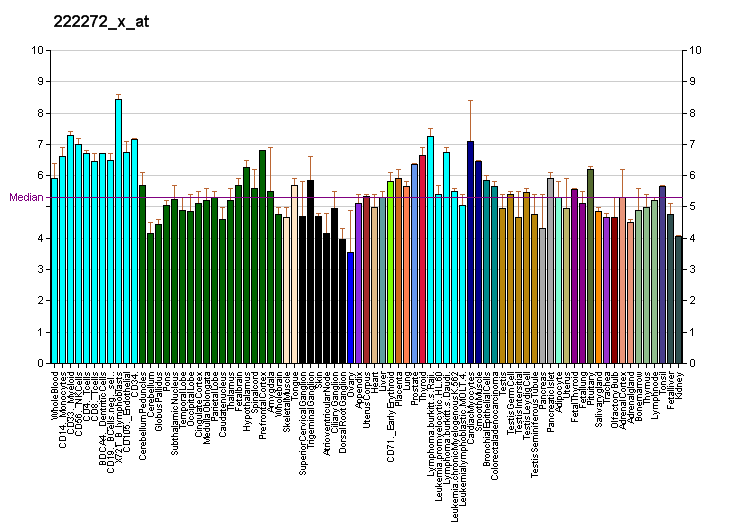
RNA expression pattern
Bgee	Human / Mouse (ortholog); Top expressed in: jejunal mucosa; tibia; renal medulla; duodenum; Achilles tendon; mucosa of transverse colon; human kidney; buccal mucosa cell; palpebral conjunctiva; oral cavity / Top expressed in: Ileal epithelium; left colon; molar; corneal stroma; lumbar spinal ganglion; Paneth cell; gastrula; seminal vesicula; jejunum; skin of external ear; More reference expression data
BioGPS	More reference expression data
Gene ontology
Molecular function	calcium ion binding; phosphatidylserine binding; actin filament binding; 1-phosphatidylinositol binding; actin binding; phosphatidylinositol-4,5-bisphosphate binding; metal ion binding
Cellular component	cytoplasm; cell cortex; brush border; extracellular exosome; cytoskeleton; podosome; cell junction; cell projection; plasma membrane; protein-containing complex
Biological process	sequestering of actin monomers; regulation of chondrocyte differentiation; actin nucleation; actin filament severing; positive regulation of actin nucleation; positive regulation of secretion; actin filament capping; positive regulation of apoptotic process; positive regulation of megakaryocyte differentiation; negative regulation of cell population proliferation; calcium-ion regulated exocytosis
Sources:Amigo / QuickGO
Orthologs
Databases	NCBI: entry; OMA: entry
Species	Human	Mouse
Entrez	85477	20259
Ensembl	ENSG00000006747	ENSMUSG00000002565
UniProt	Q9Y6U3	Q60604
RefSeq (mRNA)	NM_001112706; NM_033128	NM_001146196; NM_009132
RefSeq (protein)	NP_001106177; NP_149119	NP_001139668; NP_033158
Location (UCSC)	Chr 7: 12.57 – 12.66 Mb	Chr 12: 40.11 – 40.18 Mb
PubMed search
- Wikidata
View/Edit Human	View/Edit Mouse

Scinderin (also known as adseverin) is a protein that in humans is encoded by the SCIN gene. Scinderin is an actin severing protein belonging to the gelsolin superfamily. It was discovered in Dr. Trifaro's laboratory at the University of Ottawa, Canada. Secretory tissues are rich in scinderin. In these tissues scinderin, a calcium dependent protein, regulates cortical actin networks. Normally secretory vesicles are excluded from release sites on the plasma membrane by the presence of a cortical actin filament network. During cell stimulation, calcium channels open allowing calcium ions to enter the secretory cell. Increase in intracellular calcium activates scinderin with the consequent actin filament severing and local dissociation of actin filament networks. This allows the movement of secretory vesicles to release sites on the plasma membrane.
