= ABLIM1 =

Protein-coding gene in the species Homo sapiens

Identifiers
- Aliases: ABLIM1, ABLIM, LIMAB1, LIMATIN, abLIM-1, actin binding LIM protein 1
- External IDs: OMIM: 602330; MGI: 1194500; GeneCards: ABLIM1

Gene location (Human)
Chr.	Chromosome 10 (human)
Band	10q25.3	Start	114,431,112 bp
Band	10q25.3	End	114,768,061 bp

Gene location (Mouse)
Chr.	Chromosome 19 (mouse)
Band	19 D2|19 52.09 cM	Start	57,021,165 bp
Band	19 D2|19 52.09 cM	End	57,303,351 bp
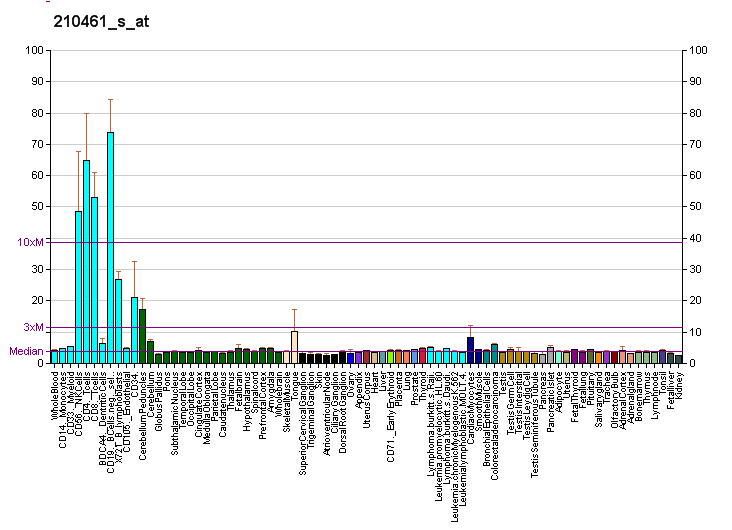

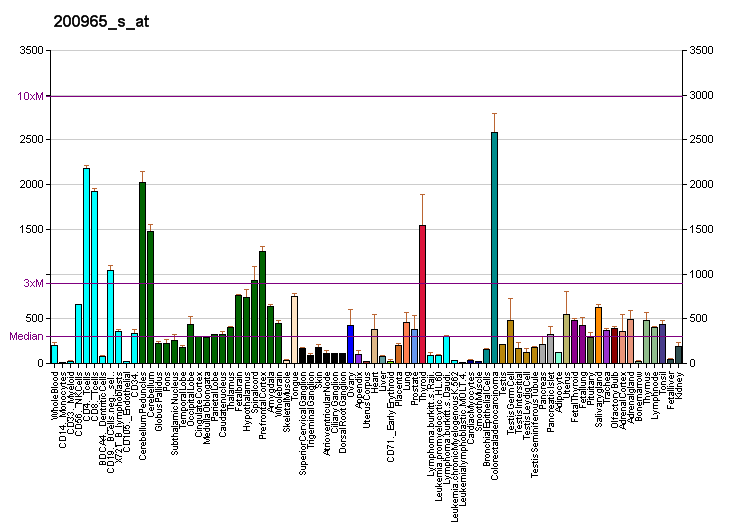
RNA expression pattern
Bgee	Human / Mouse (ortholog); Top expressed in: myocardium of left ventricle; cerebellar vermis; cardiac muscle tissue of right atrium; right ventricle; mucosa of pharynx; cerebellar hemisphere; parotid gland; gums; gingival epithelium; oral cavity / Top expressed in: cardiac muscle tissue of left ventricle; conjunctival fornix; right ventricle; thymus; lobe of cerebellum; cerebellar vermis; esophagus; epithelium of stomach; mesenteric lymph nodes; subcutaneous adipose tissue; More reference expression data
BioGPS	More reference expression data
Gene ontology
Molecular function	actin binding; protein binding; metal ion binding; actin filament binding
Cellular component	cytoplasm; lamellipodium; cytoskeleton; stress fiber; actin cytoskeleton
Biological process	animal organ morphogenesis; cytoskeleton organization; lamellipodium assembly; visual perception; cilium assembly
Sources:Amigo / QuickGO
Orthologs
Databases	NCBI: entry; OMA: entry
Species	Human	Mouse
Entrez	3983	226251
Ensembl	ENSG00000099204	ENSMUSG00000025085
UniProt	O14639	Q8K4G5
RefSeq (mRNA)	NM_001003407; NM_001003408; NM_002313; NM_006720; NM_001322882 NM_001322883; NM_001322884; NM_001322885; NM_001322886; NM_001322887; NM_001322888; NM_001322889; NM_001322890; NM_001322891; NM_001322892; NM_001322893; NM_001322894; NM_001322895; NM_001322896; NM_001322897; NM_001322898; NM_001322899; NM_001322900; NM_001352440; NM_001352441; NM_001352442; NM_001352443	NM_001103177; NM_001103178; NM_001290813; NM_001290815; NM_001290816 NM_178688; NM_001347459; NM_001362445; NM_001362446
RefSeq (protein)	NP_001003407; NP_001309811; NP_001309812; NP_001309813; NP_001309814 NP_001309815; NP_001309816; NP_001309817; NP_001309818; NP_001309819; NP_001309820; NP_001309821; NP_001309822; NP_001309823; NP_001309824; NP_001309825; NP_001309826; NP_001309827; NP_001309828; NP_001309829; NP_002304; NP_006711; NP_001339369; NP_001339370; NP_001339371; NP_001339372	NP_001096647; NP_001096648; NP_001277742; NP_001277744; NP_001277745 NP_001334388; NP_848803; NP_001349374; NP_001349375
Location (UCSC)	Chr 10: 114.43 – 114.77 Mb	Chr 19: 57.02 – 57.3 Mb
PubMed search
- Wikidata
View/Edit Human	View/Edit Mouse

Actin binding LIM protein 1, also known as ABLIM1, is a protein which in humans is encoded by the ABLIM1 gene.

== Function ==
This gene encodes a cytoskeletal LIM protein that binds to actin filaments via a domain that is homologous to erythrocyte dematin. LIM domains, found in over 60 proteins, play key roles in the regulation of developmental pathways. LIM domains also function as protein-binding interfaces, mediating specific protein-protein interactions. The protein encoded by this gene could mediate such interactions between actin filaments and cytoplasmic targets. Alternatively spliced transcript variants encoding different isoforms have been identified.

== Interactions ==
ABLIM1 has been shown to interact with LDOC1.
