= DBN1 =

Protein-coding gene in the species Homo sapiens

Identifiers
- Aliases: DBN1, D0S117E, drebrin 1
- External IDs: OMIM: 126660; MGI: 1931838; HomoloGene: 3236; GeneCards: DBN1; OMA:DBN1 - orthologs

Gene location (Human)
Chr.	Chromosome 5 (human)
Band	5q35.3	Start	177,456,608 bp
Band	5q35.3	End	177,474,401 bp

Gene location (Mouse)
Chr.	Chromosome 13 (mouse)
Band	13 B1|13 30.06 cM	Start	55,621,242 bp
Band	13 B1|13 30.06 cM	End	55,635,924 bp
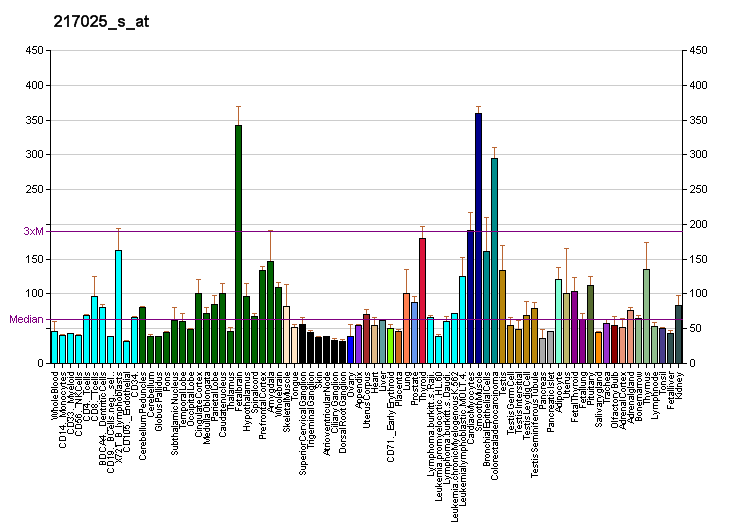

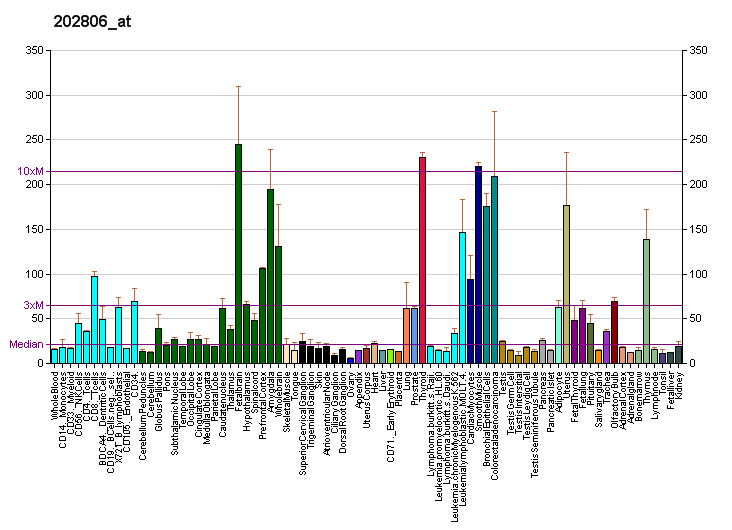
RNA expression pattern
Bgee	Human / Mouse (ortholog); Top expressed in: ganglionic eminence; sural nerve; stromal cell of endometrium; ventricular zone; gastric mucosa; ascending aorta; left uterine tube; Descending thoracic aorta; nucleus accumbens; body of uterus / Top expressed in: maxillary prominence; mandibular prominence; ventricular zone; ganglionic eminence; dentate gyrus of hippocampal formation granule cell; superior frontal gyrus; olfactory tubercle; subiculum; neural tube; lateral septal nucleus; More reference expression data
BioGPS	More reference expression data
Gene ontology
Molecular function	profilin binding; protein binding; actin binding; cadherin binding
Cellular component	cell projection; membrane; cell-cell junction; intracellular anatomical structure; cell junction; dendrite; cell cortex; gap junction; actomyosin; cytoplasm; growth cone; plasma membrane; actin cytoskeleton; cytoskeleton; postsynaptic density; cortical cytoskeleton; postsynaptic membrane; glutamatergic synapse; postsynaptic cytosol
Biological process	cell differentiation; cell communication by electrical coupling; regulation of dendrite development; nervous system development; generation of neurons; multicellular organism development; neural precursor cell proliferation; regulation of neuronal synaptic plasticity; maintenance of protein location in cell; cell communication by chemical coupling; actin filament organization; positive regulation of synaptic plasticity; cytoplasmic sequestering of protein; positive regulation of dendritic spine morphogenesis; positive regulation of receptor localization to synapse
Sources:Amigo / QuickGO
Orthologs
Species	Human	Mouse
Entrez	1627	56320
Ensembl	ENSG00000113758	ENSMUSG00000034675
UniProt	Q16643	Q9QXS6
RefSeq (mRNA)	NM_004395; NM_080881; NM_001363541; NM_001364151; NM_001364152 NM_001393630; NM_001393631	NM_001177371; NM_001177372; NM_019813
RefSeq (protein)	NP_004386; NP_543157; NP_001350470; NP_001351080; NP_001351081	NP_001170842; NP_001170843; NP_062787
Location (UCSC)	Chr 5: 177.46 – 177.47 Mb	Chr 13: 55.62 – 55.64 Mb
PubMed search
- Wikidata
View/Edit Human	View/Edit Mouse

Drebrin is a protein that in humans is encoded by the DBN1 gene.

The protein encoded by this gene is a cytoplasmic actin-binding protein thought to play a role in the process of neuronal growth. It is a member of the drebrin family of proteins that are developmentally regulated in the brain. A decrease in the amount of this protein in the brain has been implicated as a possible contributing factor in the pathogenesis of memory disturbance in Alzheimer's disease. At least two alternative splice variants encoding different protein isoforms have been described for this gene.
