= Bistramide A =

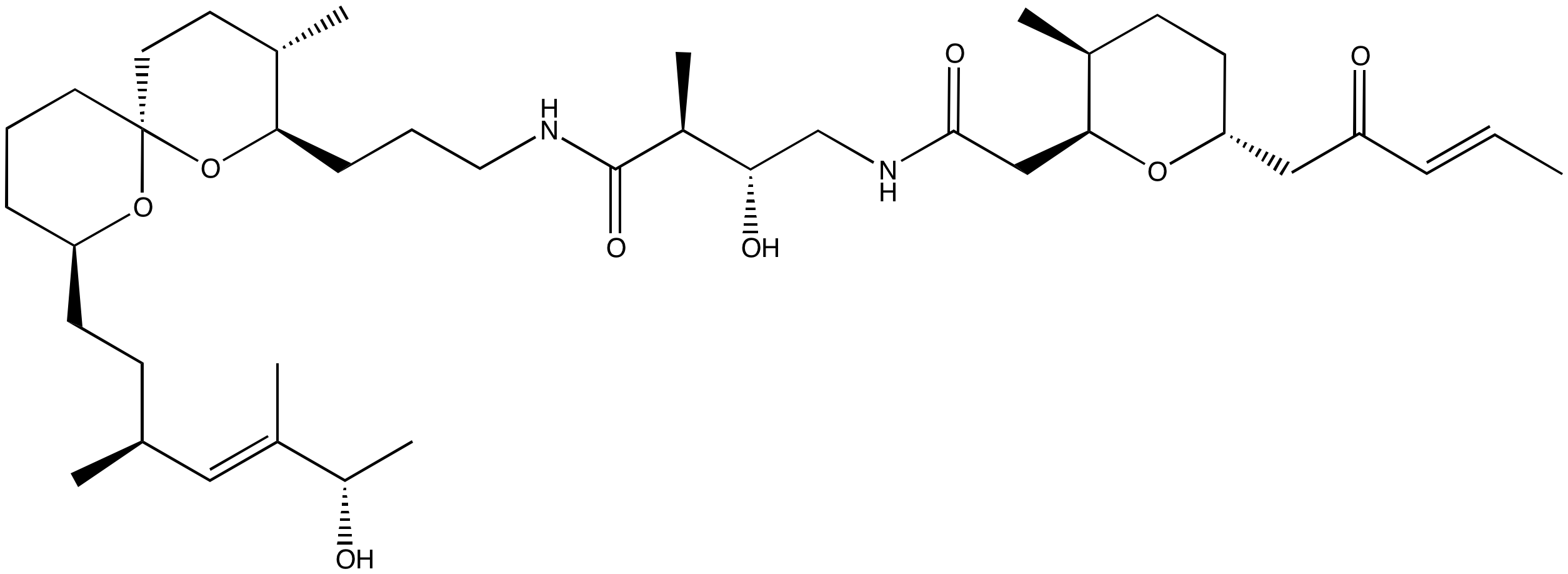

Names
- Preferred IUPAC name (2S,3R)-3-Hydroxy-N-(3-{(2R,3S,6S,8R)-8-[(3S,4E,6S)-6-hydroxy-3,5-dimethylhept-4-en-1-yl]-3-methyl-1,7-dioxaspiro[5.5]undecan-2-yl}propyl)-2-methyl-4-(2-{(2S,3S,6R)-3-methyl-6-[(3E)-2-oxopent-3-en-1-yl]oxan-2-yl}acetamido)butanamide

Identifiers
CAS Number	115566-02-4
3D model (JSmol)	Interactive image
ChEMBL	ChEMBL1221600
ChemSpider	25053776
PubChem CID	49864366
- InChI: InChI=1S/C40H68N2O8/c1-8-11-32(44)23-34-17-15-27(3)37(48-34)24-38(46)42-25-35(45)30(6)39(47)41-21-10-13-36-28(4)18-20-40(50-36)19-9-12-33(49-40)16-14-26(2)22-29(5)31(7)43/h8,11,22,26-28,30-31,33-37,43,45H,9-10,12-21,23-25H2,1-7H3,(H,41,47)(H,42,46)/b11-8+,29-22+/t26-,27-,28-,30-,31-,33+,34+,35-,36+,37-,40-/m0/s1 Key: HXZRMADPDYFMEB-FTTMEYFSSA-N; InChI=1/C40H68N2O8/c1-8-11-32(44)23-34-17-15-27(3)37(48-34)24-38(46)42-25-35(45)30(6)39(47)41-21-10-13-36-28(4)18-20-40(50-36)19-9-12-33(49-40)16-14-26(2)22-29(5)31(7)43/h8,11,22,26-28,30-31,33-37,43,45H,9-10,12-21,23-25H2,1-7H3,(H,41,47)(H,42,46)/b11-8+,29-22+/t26-,27-,28-,30-,31-,33+,34+,35-,36+,37-,40-/m0/s1 Key: HXZRMADPDYFMEB-FTTMEYFSBD
- SMILES: C\C=C\C(=O)C[C@H]1CC[C@H](C)[C@H](CC(=O)NC[C@H](O)[C@H](C)C(=O)NCCC[C@H]2O[C@@]3(CCC[C@H](CC[C@H](C)\C=C(/C)\[C@H](C)O)O3)CC[C@@H]2C)O1

Properties
Chemical formula	C_{40}H_{68}N_{2}O_{8}
Molar mass	704.990 g·mol^{−1}
- Except where otherwise noted, data are given for materials in their standard state (at 25 °C [77 °F], 100 kPa). verify (what is ?) Infobox references

Bistramide A is a chemical compound originally found in the marine ascidian Lissoclinum bistratum, in the genus Lissoclinum. It has been identified as a toxin.
