= Transgelin =

Protein-coding gene in the species Homo sapiens

TAGLN
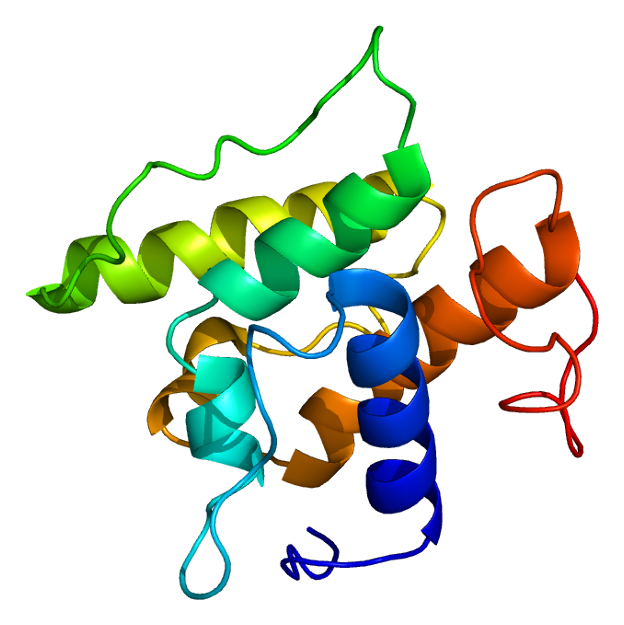

Identifiers
- Aliases: TAGLN, SM22, SMCC, TAGLN1, WS3-10, transgelin, SM22-alpha
- External IDs: OMIM: 600818; MGI: 106012; GeneCards: TAGLN
Available structures
PDB	Ortholog search: PDBe RCSB
PDB	List of PDB id codes 1UJO

Gene location (Human)
Chr.	Chromosome 11 (human)
Band	11q23.3	Start	117,199,370 bp
Band	11q23.3	End	117,207,464 bp

Gene location (Mouse)
Chr.	Chromosome 9 (mouse)
Band	9 A5.2|9 25.36 cM	Start	45,840,917 bp
Band	9 A5.2|9 25.36 cM	End	45,847,356 bp
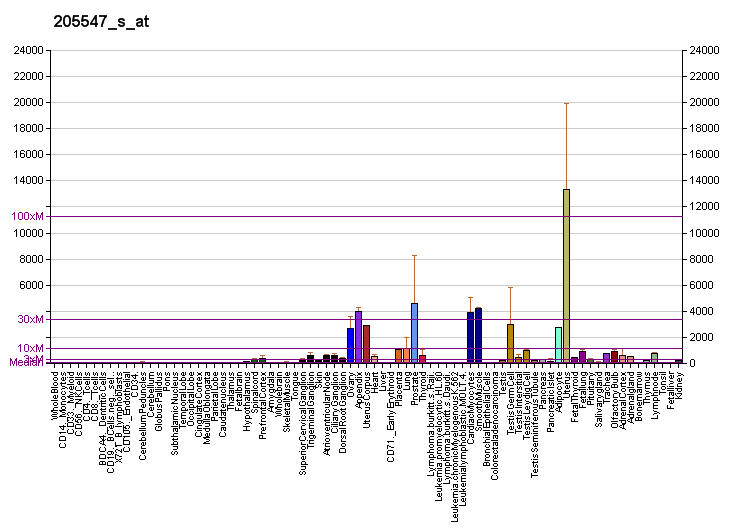
RNA expression pattern
Bgee	Human / Mouse (ortholog); Top expressed in: saphenous vein; popliteal artery; tibial arteries; right coronary artery; ascending aorta; Descending thoracic aorta; left coronary artery; tail of epididymis; myometrium; urethra / Top expressed in: tunica media of zone of aorta; ascending aorta; umbilical cord; cervix; aortic valve; seminal vesicula; left colon; calvaria; gallbladder; tunica adventitia of aorta; More reference expression data
BioGPS	More reference expression data
Gene ontology
Molecular function	protein binding; actin binding; actin filament binding
Cellular component	cytoplasm
Biological process	muscle organ development; epithelial cell differentiation
Sources:Amigo / QuickGO
Orthologs
Databases	NCBI: entry; OMA: entry
Species	Human	Mouse
Entrez	6876	21345
Ensembl	ENSG00000149591	ENSMUSG00000032085
UniProt	Q01995	P37804
RefSeq (mRNA)	NM_003186; NM_001001522	NM_011526
RefSeq (protein)	NP_001001522; NP_003177	NP_035656
Location (UCSC)	Chr 11: 117.2 – 117.21 Mb	Chr 9: 45.84 – 45.85 Mb
PubMed search
- Wikidata
View/Edit Human	View/Edit Mouse

Transgelin is a protein that in humans is encoded by the TAGLN gene.

The protein encoded by this gene is a transformation and shape-change sensitive actin cross-linking/gelling protein found in fibroblasts and smooth muscle. Its expression is down-regulated in many cell lines, and this down-regulation may be an early and sensitive marker for the onset of transformation. A functional role of this protein is unclear. Two transcript variants encoding the same protein have been found for this gene.
