= SMTN =

Protein-coding gene in the species Homo sapiens

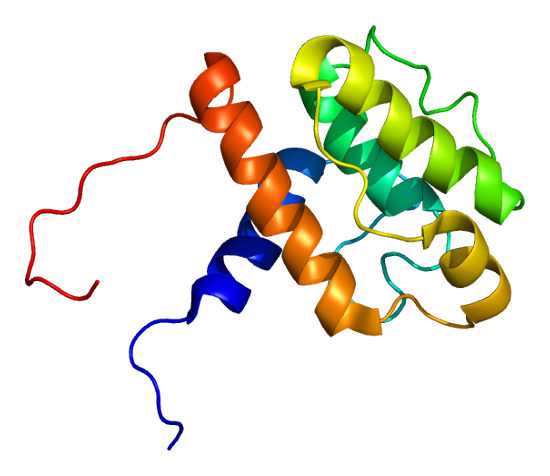

Identifiers
- Aliases: SMTN, smoothelin
- External IDs: OMIM: 602127; MGI: 1354727; GeneCards: SMTN
Available structures
PDB	Ortholog search: PDBe RCSB
PDB	List of PDB id codes 2D87

Gene location (Human)
Chr.	Chromosome 22 (human)
Band	22q12.2	Start	31,064,105 bp
Band	22q12.2	End	31,104,757 bp

Gene location (Mouse)
Chr.	Chromosome 11 (mouse)
Band	11|11 A1	Start	3,467,523 bp
Band	11|11 A1	End	3,490,612 bp
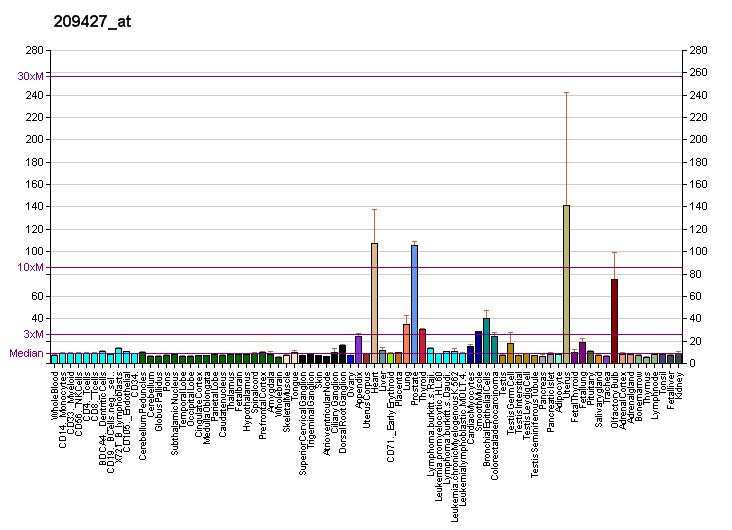

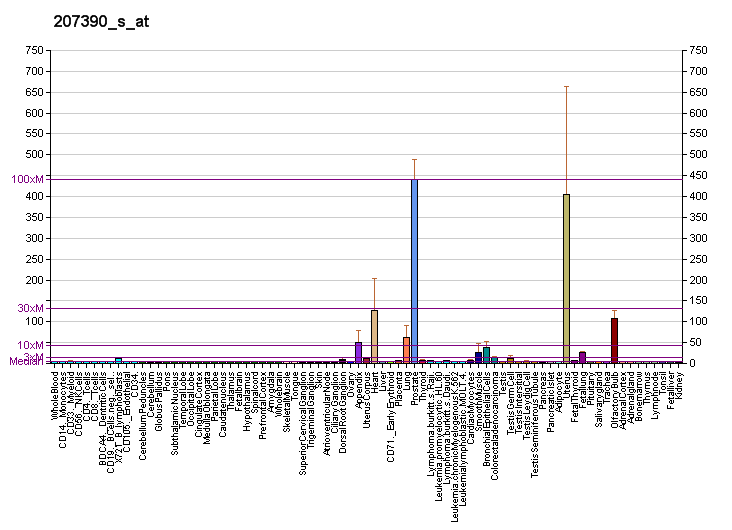
RNA expression pattern
Bgee	Human / Mouse (ortholog); Top expressed in: gastric mucosa; popliteal artery; tibial arteries; muscle layer of sigmoid colon; body of uterus; apex of heart; left uterine tube; Descending thoracic aorta; ascending aorta; right coronary artery / Top expressed in: tunica media of zone of aorta; ascending aorta; uterus; lip; aortic valve; temporal muscle; digastric muscle; sternocleidomastoid muscle; triceps brachii muscle; muscle of thigh; More reference expression data
BioGPS	More reference expression data
Gene ontology
Molecular function	actin binding; structural constituent of muscle
Cellular component	cytoplasm; cytoskeleton; actin cytoskeleton; microtubule organizing center; filamentous actin; nucleoplasm
Biological process	smooth muscle contraction; muscle organ development; actin cytoskeleton organization
Sources:Amigo / QuickGO
Orthologs
Databases	NCBI: entry; OMA: entry
Species	Human	Mouse
Entrez	6525	29856
Ensembl	ENSG00000183963	ENSMUSG00000020439
UniProt	P53814	Q921U8
RefSeq (mRNA)	NM_001207017; NM_001207018; NM_006932; NM_134269; NM_134270	NM_001159284; NM_001284427; NM_001284428; NM_001284429; NM_013870
RefSeq (protein)	NP_001193946; NP_001193947; NP_008863; NP_599031; NP_599032 NP_001369567; NP_001369568; NP_001369569; NP_001369570; NP_001369571; NP_001369572; NP_001369573; NP_001369574; NP_001369575; NP_001369576; NP_001369577	NP_001152756; NP_001271356; NP_001271357; NP_001271358; NP_038898
Location (UCSC)	Chr 22: 31.06 – 31.1 Mb	Chr 11: 3.47 – 3.49 Mb
PubMed search
- Wikidata
View/Edit Human	View/Edit Mouse

Smoothelin is a protein that in humans is encoded by the SMTN gene.

This gene encodes a structural protein that is found exclusively in contractile smooth muscle cells. It associates with stress fibers and constitutes part of the cytoskeleton. This gene is localized to chromosome 22q12.3, distal to the TUPLE1 locus and outside the DiGeorge syndrome deletion. Alternative splicing of this gene results in three transcript variants.
