= CCDC88A =

Protein-coding gene in humans

Identifiers
- Aliases: CCDC88A, APE, GIRDIN, GIV, GRDN, HkRP1, KIAA1212, coiled-coil domain containing 88A, PEHO, PEHOL
- External IDs: OMIM: 609736; MGI: 1925177; GeneCards: CCDC88A

Gene location (Human)
Chr.	Chromosome 2 (human)
Band	2p16.1	Start	55,287,842 bp
Band	2p16.1	End	55,419,895 bp

Gene location (Mouse)
Chr.	Chromosome 11 (mouse)
Band	11|11 A3.3	Start	29,323,658 bp
Band	11|11 A3.3	End	29,460,808 bp
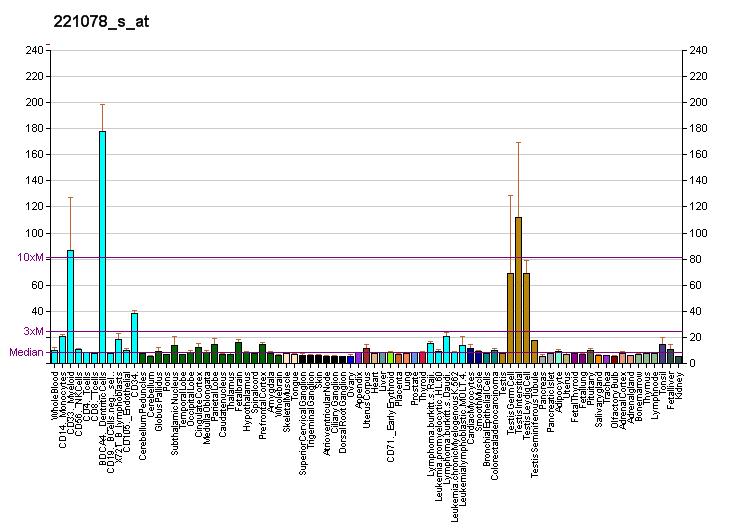

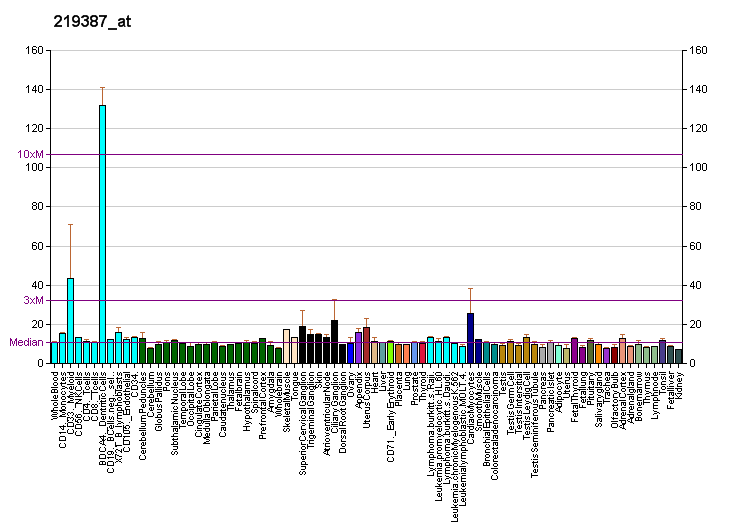
RNA expression pattern
Bgee	Human / Mouse (ortholog); Top expressed in: internal globus pallidus; corpus callosum; ventricular zone; ganglionic eminence; Achilles tendon; subthalamic nucleus; buccal mucosa cell; inferior ganglion of vagus nerve; tendon of biceps brachii; testicle / Top expressed in: Rostral migratory stream; barrel cortex; tail of embryo; genital tubercle; lateral septal nucleus; lateral geniculate nucleus; mammillary body; ventromedial nucleus; spermatid; anterior amygdaloid area; More reference expression data
BioGPS	More reference expression data
Gene ontology
Molecular function	protein homodimerization activity; phosphatidylinositol binding; actin binding; microtubule binding; protein kinase B binding; dynein light intermediate chain binding; G-protein gamma-subunit binding
Cellular component	cytoplasm; Golgi apparatus; cell projection; endoplasmic reticulum; lamellipodium; membrane; cytoplasmic vesicle; cytosol; plasma membrane; cell leading edge; centrosome; centriole; cytoskeleton; ciliary basal body; COPI-coated Golgi to ER transport vesicle
Biological process	regulation of actin cytoskeleton organization; nervous system development; DNA replication; membrane organization; cell migration; lamellipodium assembly; activation of protein kinase B activity; regulation of DNA replication; TOR signaling; regulation of protein phosphorylation; regulation of cell population proliferation; regulation of neuron projection development; cell projection organization; cytoskeleton-dependent intracellular transport; cytoplasmic microtubule organization; positive regulation of cilium assembly; positive regulation of protein localization to cilium
Sources:Amigo / QuickGO
Orthologs
Databases	NCBI: entry; OMA: entry
Species	Human	Mouse
Entrez	55704	108686
Ensembl	ENSG00000115355	ENSMUSG00000032740
UniProt	Q3V6T2	Q5SNZ0
RefSeq (mRNA)	NM_001135597; NM_001254943; NM_018084; NM_001365480	NM_176841; NM_001363368; NM_001363369
RefSeq (protein)	NP_001129069; NP_001241872; NP_060554; NP_001352409	NP_789811; NP_001350297; NP_001350298
Location (UCSC)	Chr 2: 55.29 – 55.42 Mb	Chr 11: 29.32 – 29.46 Mb
PubMed search
- Wikidata
View/Edit Human	View/Edit Mouse

Girdin is a protein that in humans is encoded by the CCDC88A gene. Although its cellular function are not fully elucidated, it has been associated with glioma.
