= PASK =

Protein-coding gene in the species Homo sapiens

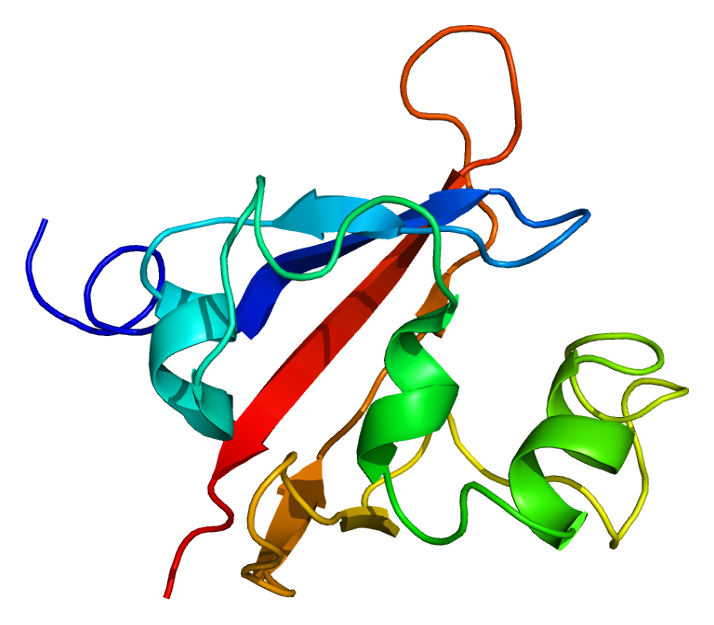
Available structures
PDB	Ortholog search: PDBe RCSB
PDB	List of PDB id codes 1LL8, 3DLS

Identifiers
- Aliases: PASK, PASKIN, STK37, PAS domain containing serine/threonine kinase
- External IDs: OMIM: 607505; MGI: 2155936; HomoloGene: 9038; GeneCards: PASK; OMA:PASK - orthologs

Gene location (Human)
Chr.	Chromosome 2 (human)
Band	2q37.3	Start	241,106,099 bp
Band	2q37.3	End	241,150,264 bp

Gene location (Mouse)
Chr.	Chromosome 1 (mouse)
Band	1|1 D	Start	93,236,492 bp
Band	1|1 D	End	93,271,204 bp
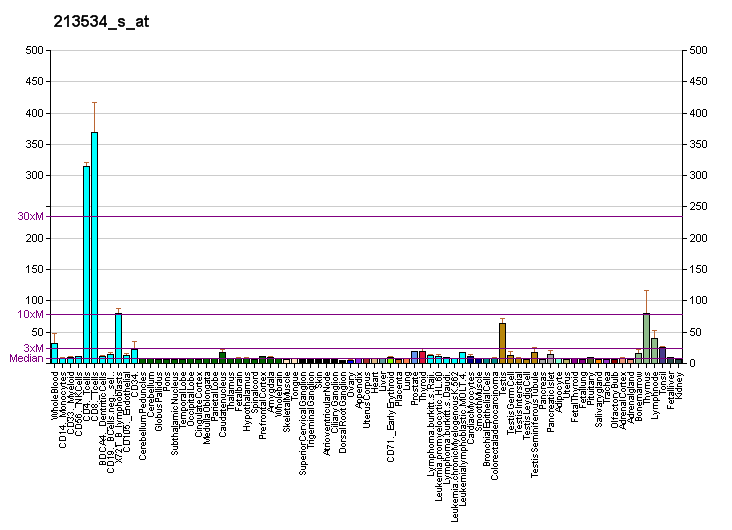

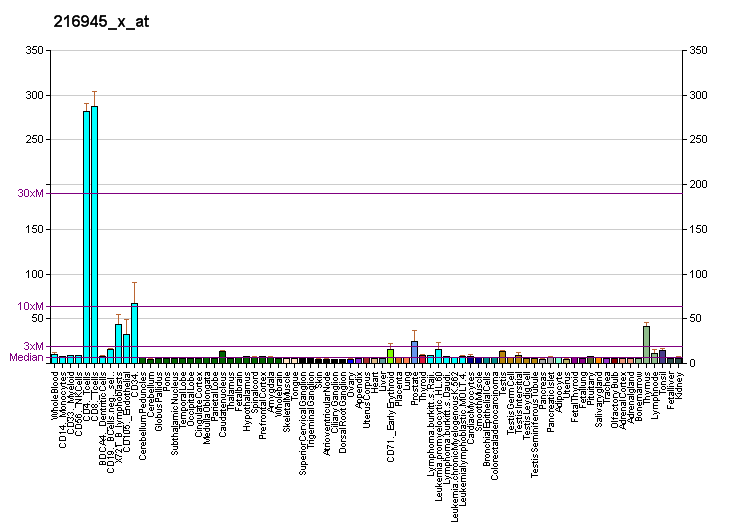
RNA expression pattern
Bgee	Human / Mouse (ortholog); Top expressed in: right uterine tube; oocyte; right testis; left testis; secondary oocyte; lymph node; appendix; caudate nucleus; putamen; nucleus accumbens / Top expressed in: spermatocyte; spermatid; otic vesicle; otic placode; saccule; seminiferous tubule; epiblast; ventricular zone; tail of embryo; gastrula; More reference expression data
BioGPS	More reference expression data
Gene ontology
Molecular function	kinase activity; transferase activity; nucleotide binding; protein kinase activity; protein binding; ATP binding; phosphatidylinositol binding; lipid binding; protein serine/threonine kinase activity
Cellular component	nucleus; cytosol; cytoplasm
Biological process	regulation of respiratory gaseous exchange; protein autophosphorylation; negative regulation of glycogen biosynthetic process; positive regulation of translation; regulation of glucagon secretion; phosphorylation; protein phosphorylation; energy homeostasis; intracellular signal transduction
Sources:Amigo / QuickGO
Orthologs
Species	Human	Mouse
Entrez	23178	269224
Ensembl	ENSG00000115687	ENSMUSG00000026274
UniProt	Q96RG2	Q8CEE6
RefSeq (mRNA)	NM_001252119; NM_001252120; NM_001252122; NM_001252124; NM_015148	NM_080850
RefSeq (protein)	NP_001239048; NP_001239049; NP_001239051; NP_001239053; NP_055963	NP_543126
Location (UCSC)	Chr 2: 241.11 – 241.15 Mb	Chr 1: 93.24 – 93.27 Mb
PubMed search
- Wikidata
View/Edit Human	View/Edit Mouse

PAS domain-containing serine/threonine-protein kinase is an enzyme that in humans is encoded by the PASK gene.

PAS domains regulate the function of many intracellular signaling pathways in response to both extrinsic and intrinsic stimuli. PASK is an evolutionarily conserved protein present in yeast, flies, and mammals.[supplied by OMIM]
