= LSP1 =

Protein-coding gene in the species Homo sapiens

Available structures
PDB	Ortholog search: PDBe RCSB
PDB	List of PDB id codes 3BH8, 4NO0, 4NO2

Identifiers
- Aliases: LSP1, WP34, pp52, lymphocyte-specific protein 1, lymphocyte specific protein 1
- External IDs: OMIM: 153432; MGI: 96832; HomoloGene: 1750; GeneCards: LSP1; OMA:LSP1 - orthologs

Gene location (Human)
Chr.	Chromosome 11 (human)
Band	11p15.5	Start	1,850,904 bp
Band	11p15.5	End	1,892,267 bp

Gene location (Mouse)
Chr.	Chromosome 7 (mouse)
Band	7 F5|7 87.93 cM	Start	142,014,546 bp
Band	7 F5|7 87.93 cM	End	142,048,604 bp
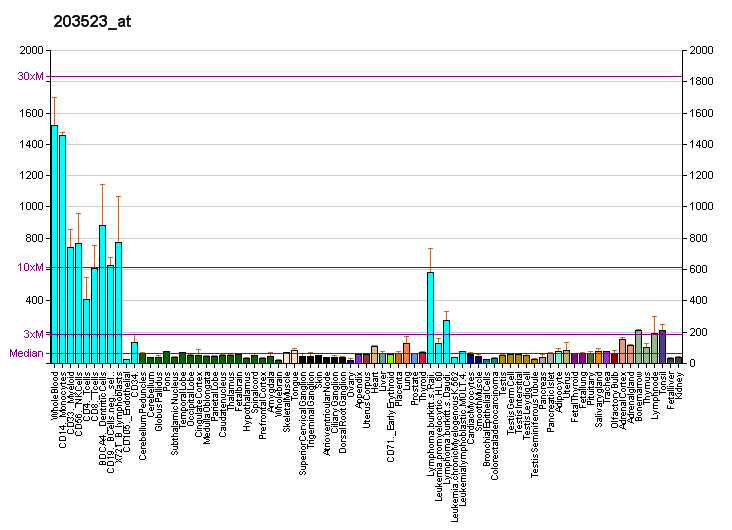
RNA expression pattern
Bgee	Human / Mouse (ortholog); Top expressed in: granulocyte; blood; monocyte; spleen; appendix; bone marrow cells; right adrenal cortex; lymph node; left adrenal gland; left adrenal cortex / Top expressed in: granulocyte; thymus; mesenteric lymph nodes; tibiofemoral joint; vas deferens; spleen; uterus; lip; efferent ductule; blood; More reference expression data
BioGPS	More reference expression data
Gene ontology
Molecular function	actin binding; signal transducer activity
Cellular component	extracellular exosome; actin cytoskeleton; membrane; plasma membrane
Biological process	chemotaxis; cellular defense response; defense response; signal transduction
Sources:Amigo / QuickGO
Orthologs
Species	Human	Mouse
Entrez	4046	16985
Ensembl	ENSG00000130592; ENSG00000288199	ENSMUSG00000018819
UniProt	P33241	P19973
RefSeq (mRNA)	NM_002339; NM_001013253; NM_001013254; NM_001013255; NM_001242932 NM_001289005	NM_001136071; NM_001271508; NM_001271509; NM_001271510; NM_001271523 NM_019391
RefSeq (protein)	NP_001013271; NP_001013272; NP_001013273; NP_001229861; NP_001275934 NP_002330	NP_001129543; NP_001258437; NP_001258438; NP_001258439; NP_001258452 NP_062264
Location (UCSC)	Chr 11: 1.85 – 1.89 Mb	Chr 7: 142.01 – 142.05 Mb
PubMed search
- Wikidata
View/Edit Human	View/Edit Mouse

Lymphocyte-specific protein 1 is a protein that in humans is encoded by the LSP1 gene.

This gene encodes an intracellular F-actin binding protein. The protein is expressed in lymphocytes, neutrophils, macrophages, and endothelium and may regulate neutrophil motility, adhesion to fibrinogen matrix proteins, and transendothelial migration. Alternative splicing results in multiple transcript variants encoding different isoforms.
