= TAGLN3 =

Protein-coding gene in the species Homo sapiens

Identifiers
- Aliases: TAGLN3, NP22, NP24, NP25, transgelin 3
- External IDs: OMIM: 607953; MGI: 1926784; GeneCards: TAGLN3

Gene location (Human)
Chr.	Chromosome 3 (human)
Band	3q13.2	Start	111,998,739 bp
Band	3q13.2	End	112,013,887 bp

Gene location (Mouse)
Chr.	Chromosome 16 (mouse)
Band	16|16 B5	Start	45,531,593 bp
Band	16|16 B5	End	45,544,971 bp
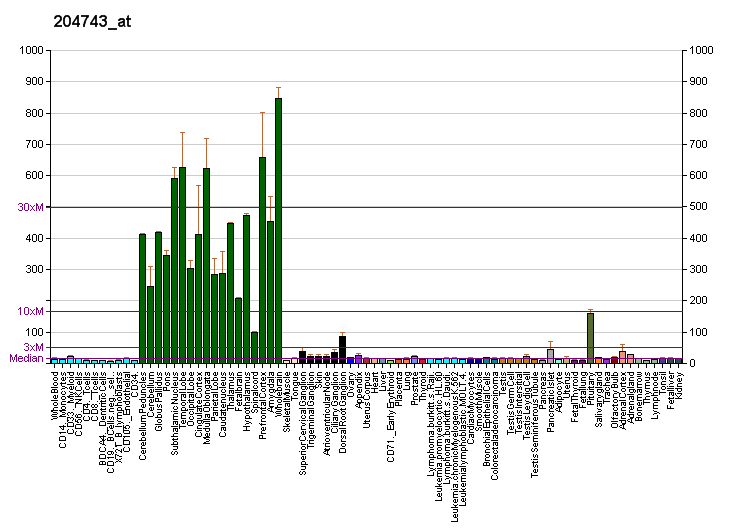
RNA expression pattern
Bgee	Human / Mouse (ortholog); Top expressed in: frontal pole; right frontal lobe; Brodmann area 10; cerebellar hemisphere; right hemisphere of cerebellum; dorsolateral prefrontal cortex; Brodmann area 9; ganglionic eminence; cingulate gyrus; anterior cingulate cortex / Top expressed in: dentate gyrus of hippocampal formation granule cell; cerebellar cortex; pontine nuclei; lateral septal nucleus; lobe of cerebellum; cerebellar vermis; medial vestibular nucleus; ventromedial nucleus; superior frontal gyrus; lateral hypothalamus; More reference expression data
BioGPS	More reference expression data
Gene ontology
Molecular function	actin filament binding
Cellular component	nucleus; myelin sheath
Biological process	central nervous system development; negative regulation of transcription by RNA polymerase II
Sources:Amigo / QuickGO
Orthologs
Databases	NCBI: entry; OMA: entry
Species	Human	Mouse
Entrez	29114	56370
Ensembl	ENSG00000144834	ENSMUSG00000022658
UniProt	Q9UI15	Q9R1Q8
RefSeq (mRNA)	NM_013259; NM_001008272; NM_001008273	NM_019754
RefSeq (protein)	NP_001008273; NP_001008274; NP_037391	NP_062728
Location (UCSC)	Chr 3: 112 – 112.01 Mb	Chr 16: 45.53 – 45.54 Mb
PubMed search
- Wikidata
View/Edit Human	View/Edit Mouse

Transgelin-3 or neuron protein NP25 is a protein that is in the nerve cells of humans, rats, mice, and chickens. It is encoded by the TAGLN3 gene.
