= TAGLN2 =

Protein-coding gene in humans

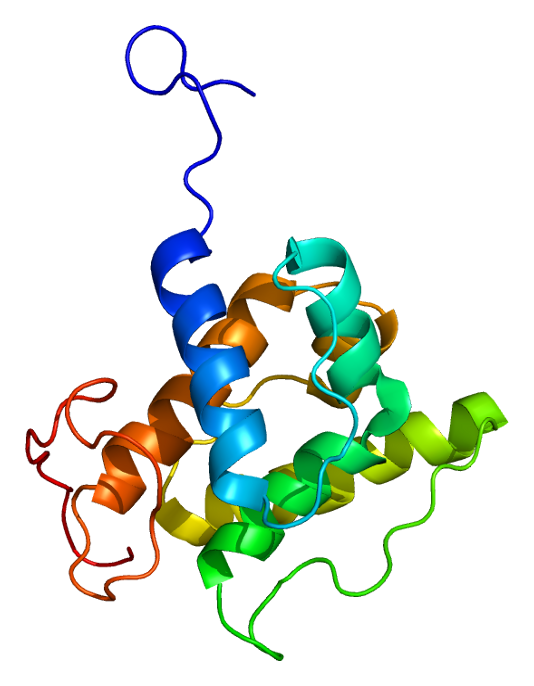

Identifiers
- Aliases: TAGLN2, HA1756, transgelin 2
- External IDs: OMIM: 604634; MGI: 1312985; GeneCards: TAGLN2
Available structures
PDB	Ortholog search: PDBe RCSB
PDB	List of PDB id codes 1WYM

Gene location (Human)
Chr.	Chromosome 1 (human)
Band	1q23.2	Start	159,918,107 bp
Band	1q23.2	End	159,925,507 bp

Gene location (Mouse)
Chr.	Chromosome 1 (mouse)
Band	1 H3|1 79.89 cM	Start	172,327,614 bp
Band	1 H3|1 79.89 cM	End	172,334,947 bp
RNA expression pattern
Bgee	Human / Mouse (ortholog); Top expressed in: upper lobe of left lung; right lung; monocyte; granulocyte; islet of Langerhans; ventricular zone; skin of abdomen; mucosa of transverse colon; minor salivary glands; gallbladder / Top expressed in: pyloric antrum; epithelium of stomach; mucous cell of stomach; lip; tail of embryo; right lung; yolk sac; right lung lobe; esophagus; left lung; More reference expression data
BioGPS	n/a
Gene ontology
Molecular function	protein binding; cadherin binding
Cellular component	vesicle; extracellular exosome; extracellular region; cytosol
Biological process	epithelial cell differentiation; platelet degranulation
Sources:Amigo / QuickGO
Orthologs
Databases	NCBI: entry; OMA: entry
Species	Human	Mouse
Entrez	8407	21346
Ensembl	ENSG00000158710	ENSMUSG00000026547
UniProt	P37802	Q9WVA4
RefSeq (mRNA)	NM_003564; NM_001277223; NM_001277224	NM_178598
RefSeq (protein)	NP_001264152; NP_001264153; NP_003555	NP_848713
Location (UCSC)	Chr 1: 159.92 – 159.93 Mb	Chr 1: 172.33 – 172.33 Mb
PubMed search
- Wikidata
View/Edit Human	View/Edit Mouse

Transgelin-2 is a protein that in humans is encoded by the TAGLN2 gene.

The protein encoded by this gene is a homolog of the protein transgelin, which is one of the earliest markers of differentiated smooth muscle. The function of this protein has not yet been determined.
