= Dematin =

Protein-coding gene in the species Homo sapiens

DMTN

Identifiers
- Aliases: DMTN, DMT, EPB49, dematin actin binding protein
- External IDs: OMIM: 125305; MGI: 99670; GeneCards: DMTN
Available structures
PDB	Ortholog search: PDBe RCSB
PDB	List of PDB id codes 1QZP, 1ZV6

Gene location (Human)
Chr.	Chromosome 8 (human)
Band	8p21.3	Start	22,048,995 bp
Band	8p21.3	End	22,082,527 bp

Gene location (Mouse)
Chr.	Chromosome 14 (mouse)
Band	14 D2|14 36.32 cM	Start	70,601,263 bp
Band	14 D2|14 36.32 cM	End	70,636,048 bp
RNA expression pattern
Bgee	Human / Mouse (ortholog); Top expressed in: right frontal lobe; cingulate gyrus; anterior cingulate cortex; prefrontal cortex; Brodmann area 10; nucleus accumbens; amygdala; Brodmann area 9; caudate nucleus; right hemisphere of cerebellum / Top expressed in: primary visual cortex; superior frontal gyrus; dentate gyrus of hippocampal formation granule cell; fetal liver hematopoietic progenitor cell; entorhinal cortex; perirhinal cortex; primary motor cortex; prefrontal cortex; olfactory tubercle; CA3 field; More reference expression data
BioGPS	More reference expression data
Gene ontology
Molecular function	spectrin binding; protein binding; actin binding; signaling receptor binding; protein self-association; actin filament binding
Cellular component	cytoplasm; cytosol; cell projection; membrane; cortical cytoskeleton; plasma membrane; platelet dense tubular network membrane; cell projection membrane; actin filament; actin cytoskeleton; spectrin-associated cytoskeleton; perinuclear region of cytoplasm; endomembrane system; cytoskeleton; postsynaptic density; cytoplasmic vesicle
Biological process	negative regulation of cell-substrate adhesion; regulation of lamellipodium assembly; cellular response to calcium ion; regulation of filopodium assembly; actin filament reorganization; regulation of actin cytoskeleton organization; negative regulation of peptidyl-threonine phosphorylation; positive regulation of wound healing; actin filament bundle assembly; positive regulation of substrate adhesion-dependent cell spreading; negative regulation of protein targeting to membrane; negative regulation of peptidyl-tyrosine phosphorylation; positive regulation of blood coagulation; calcium-mediated signaling using extracellular calcium source; cytoskeleton organization; actin filament capping; transmembrane transport; negative regulation of peptidyl-serine phosphorylation; positive regulation of integrin-mediated signaling pathway; protein secretion by platelet; negative regulation of substrate adhesion-dependent cell spreading; calcium-mediated signaling using intracellular calcium source; positive regulation of fibroblast migration; negative regulation of focal adhesion assembly; actin cytoskeleton organization; positive regulation of platelet aggregation; cellular response to cAMP; erythrocyte development; regulation of cell shape; protein-containing complex assembly; lamellipodium assembly
Sources:Amigo / QuickGO
Orthologs
Databases	NCBI: entry; OMA: entry
Species	Human	Mouse
Entrez	2039	13829
Ensembl	ENSG00000158856	ENSMUSG00000022099
UniProt	Q08495	Q9WV69
RefSeq (mRNA)	NM_001114135; NM_001114136; NM_001114137; NM_001114138; NM_001114139 NM_001302816; NM_001302817; NM_001978; NM_001323378; NM_001323380; NM_001323381; NM_001323382; NM_001323383; NM_001323384; NM_001323385; NM_001323387; NM_001323388; NM_001323389; NM_001323390; NM_001323391; NM_001323392; NM_001323393; NM_001323394; NM_001323395; NM_001323396; NM_001323397; NM_001323398; NM_001323399; NM_001323400; NM_001323401; NM_001323379; NM_001387723; NM_001387726; NM_001387727; NM_001387728; NM_001387730; NM_001387732; NM_001387734; NM_001387735; NM_001387736; NM_001387737; NM_001387742; NM_001387743; NM_001387744; NM_001387745; NM_001387750; NM_001387751; NM_001387752; NM_001387753; NM_001387754; NM_001387755; NM_001387756; NM_001387757	NM_001252662; NM_001252663; NM_001252664; NM_001252665; NM_001252666 NM_013514; NM_001360024; NM_001360025; NM_001360026; NM_001360027; NM_001360028; NM_001360029; NM_001360030
RefSeq (protein)	NP_001107607; NP_001107608; NP_001107609; NP_001107610; NP_001107611 NP_001289745; NP_001289746; NP_001310307; NP_001310308; NP_001310309; NP_001310310; NP_001310311; NP_001310312; NP_001310313; NP_001310314; NP_001310316; NP_001310317; NP_001310318; NP_001310319; NP_001310320; NP_001310321; NP_001310322; NP_001310323; NP_001310324; NP_001310325; NP_001310326; NP_001310327; NP_001310328; NP_001310329; NP_001310330; NP_001969	NP_001239591; NP_001239592; NP_001239593; NP_001239594; NP_001239595 NP_038542; NP_001346953; NP_001346954; NP_001346955; NP_001346956; NP_001346957; NP_001346958; NP_001346959
Location (UCSC)	Chr 8: 22.05 – 22.08 Mb	Chr 14: 70.6 – 70.64 Mb
PubMed search
- Wikidata
View/Edit Human	View/Edit Mouse

Dematin is a protein that in humans is encoded by the DMTN gene (formerly EPB49). Dematin functions to stabilize the cytoskeleton structure of red blood cells. In particular, it binds to actin, and induces bundling.
