= SVIL =

Protein-coding gene in the species Homo sapiens

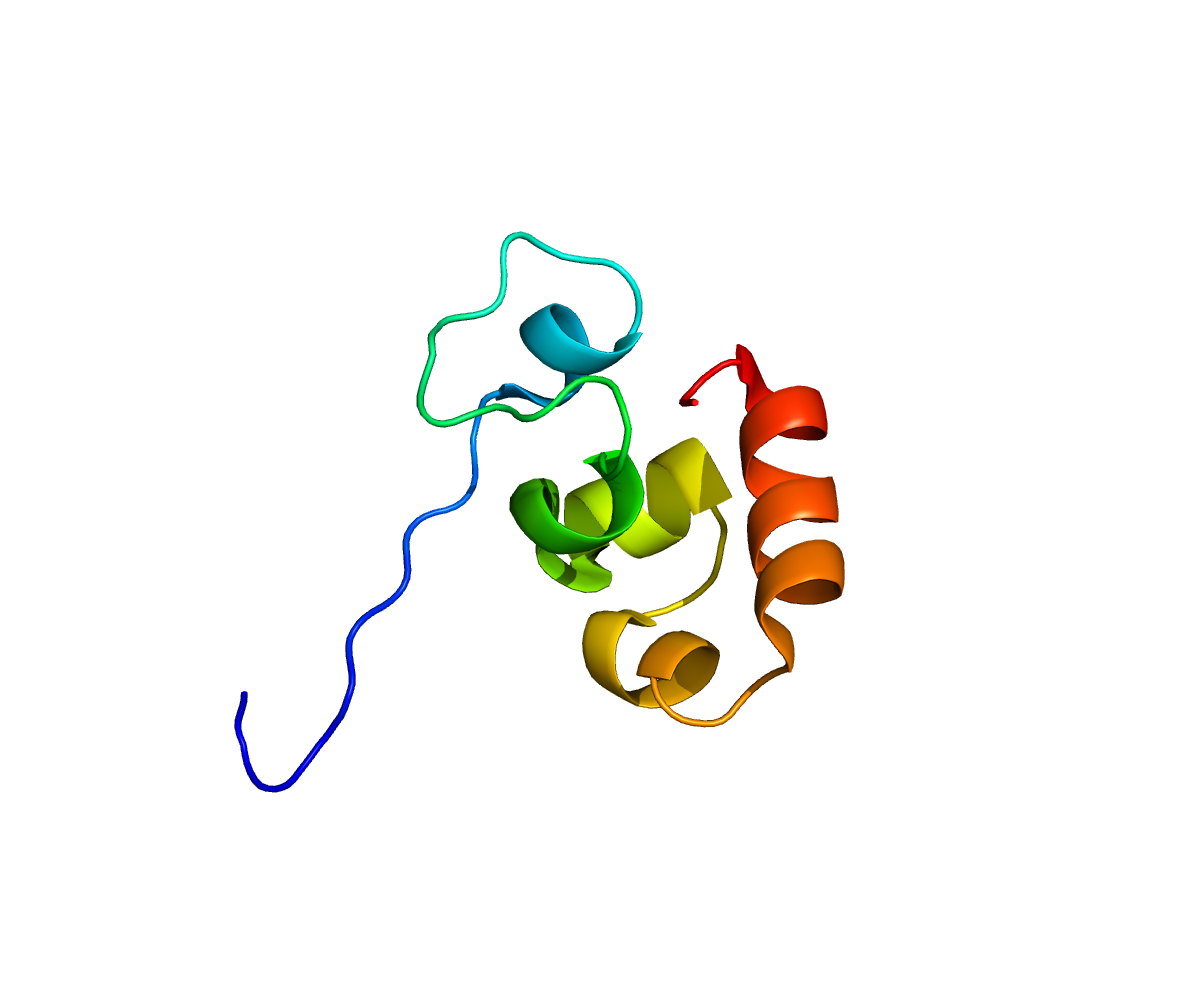

Identifiers
- Aliases: SVIL, supervillin, MFM10
- External IDs: OMIM: 604126; MGI: 2147319; GeneCards: SVIL
Available structures
PDB	Ortholog search: PDBe RCSB
PDB	List of PDB id codes 2K6M, 2K6N

Gene location (Human)
Chr.	Chromosome 10 (human)
Band	10p11.23	Start	29,457,338 bp
Band	10p11.23	End	29,736,959 bp

Gene location (Mouse)
Chr.	Chromosome 18 (mouse)
Band	18|18 A1	Start	4,920,540 bp
Band	18|18 A1	End	5,119,299 bp
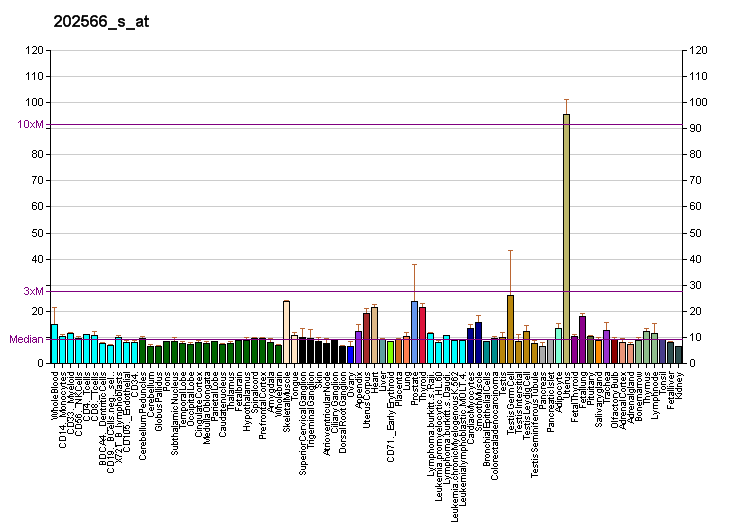

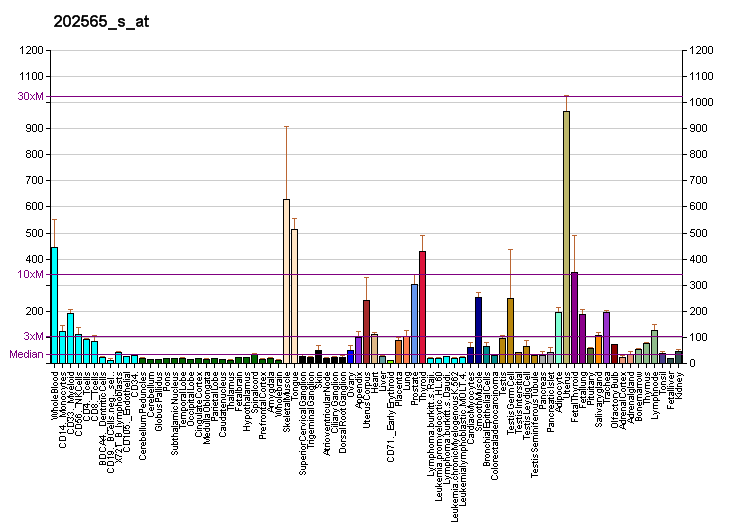
RNA expression pattern
Bgee	Human / Mouse (ortholog); Top expressed in: glutes; Skeletal muscle tissue of rectus abdominis; vastus lateralis muscle; biceps brachii; Skeletal muscle tissue of biceps brachii; deltoid muscle; gastrocnemius muscle; tibialis anterior muscle; thoracic diaphragm; body of tongue / Top expressed in: soleus muscle; triceps brachii muscle; vastus lateralis muscle; right ventricle; ankle; digastric muscle; temporal muscle; sternocleidomastoid muscle; atrium; granulocyte; More reference expression data
BioGPS	More reference expression data
Gene ontology
Molecular function	actin filament binding; actin binding; protein binding
Cellular component	cytoplasm; microtubule minus-end; podosome; cell junction; plasma membrane; cell projection; midbody; cleavage furrow; costamere; cytoskeleton; membrane; nucleus; focal adhesion; actin cytoskeleton; cytosol
Biological process	positive regulation of cytokinesis; skeletal muscle tissue development; cytoskeleton organization
Sources:Amigo / QuickGO
Orthologs
Databases	NCBI: entry; OMA: entry
Species	Human	Mouse
Entrez	6840	225115
Ensembl	ENSG00000197321	ENSMUSG00000024236
UniProt	O95425	Q8K4L3
RefSeq (mRNA)	NM_003174; NM_021738; NM_001323599; NM_001323600	NM_153153; NM_178046; NM_001347449
RefSeq (protein)	NP_001310528; NP_001310529; NP_003165; NP_068506	NP_001334378; NP_694793; NP_001392206; NP_001392207; NP_001392209 NP_001392210; NP_001392211; NP_001392219
Location (UCSC)	Chr 10: 29.46 – 29.74 Mb	Chr 18: 4.92 – 5.12 Mb
PubMed search
- Wikidata
View/Edit Human	View/Edit Mouse

Supervillin is a protein that in humans is encoded by the SVIL gene.

== Function ==
This gene encodes a bipartite protein with distinct amino- and carboxy-terminal domains. The amino-terminus contains nuclear localization signals and the carboxy-terminus contains numerous consecutive sequences with extensive similarity to proteins in the gelsolin family of actin-binding proteins, which cap, nucleate, and/or sever actin filaments. The gene product is tightly associated with both actin filaments and plasma membranes, suggesting a role as a high-affinity link between the actin cytoskeleton and the membrane. Its function may include recruitment of actin and other cytoskeletal proteins into specialized structures at the plasma membrane and in the nuclei of growing cells. Two transcript variants encoding different isoforms of supervillin have been described.

== Interactions ==
SVIL has been shown to interact with Androgen receptor.
