= Gelsolin =

Mammalian protein found in Homo sapiens

GSN
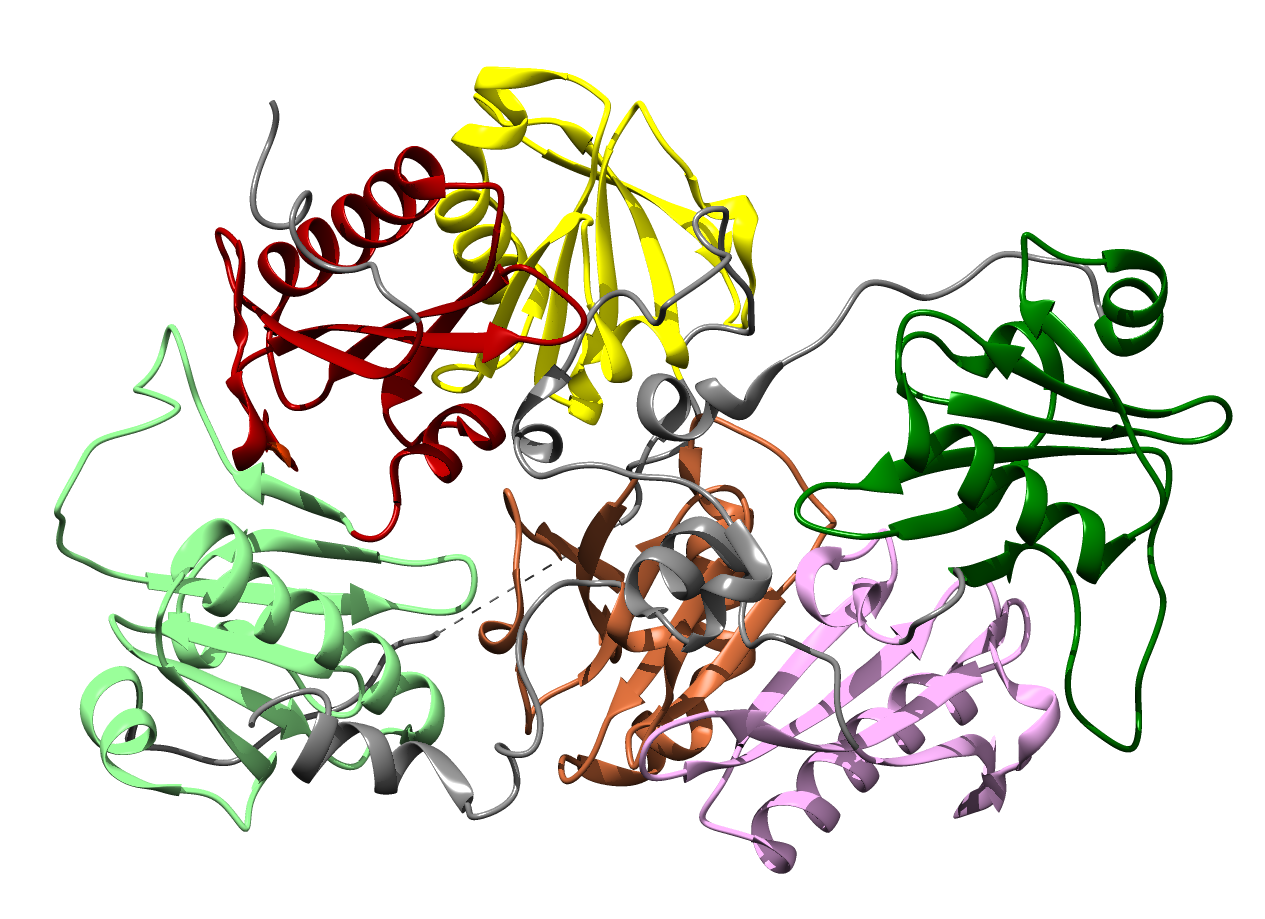

Identifiers
- Aliases: GSN, Gsn, ADF, AGEL, gelsolin
- External IDs: OMIM: 137350; MGI: 95851; GeneCards: GSN
Available structures
PDB	Ortholog search: PDBe RCSB
PDB	List of PDB id codes 1C0F, 1C0G, 1D4X, 1DEJ, 1EQY, 1ESV, 1H1V, 1KCQ, 1MDU, 1NLV, 1NM1, 1NMD, 1P8X, 1P8Z, 1SOL, 1T44, 1YAG, 1YVN, 2FF3, 2FF6, 2FH1, 2FH2, 2FH3, 2FH4, 3A5L, 3A5M, 3A5N, 3A5O, 3CI5, 3CIP, 3CJB, 3CJC, 3FFK, 3FFN, 3TU5, 4PKG, 4PKH, 4PKI, 4S10, 4Z94

Gene location (Mouse)
Chr.	Chromosome 2 (mouse)
Band	2 B|2 23.5 cM	Start	35,146,392 bp
Band	2 B|2 23.5 cM	End	35,197,904 bp
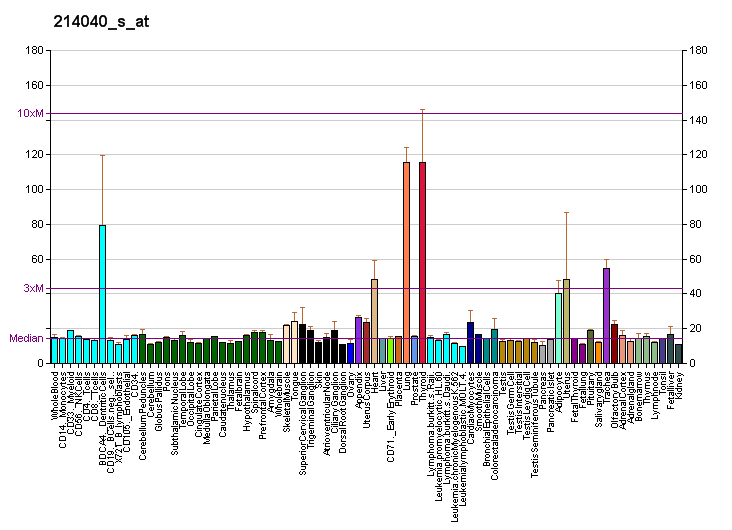

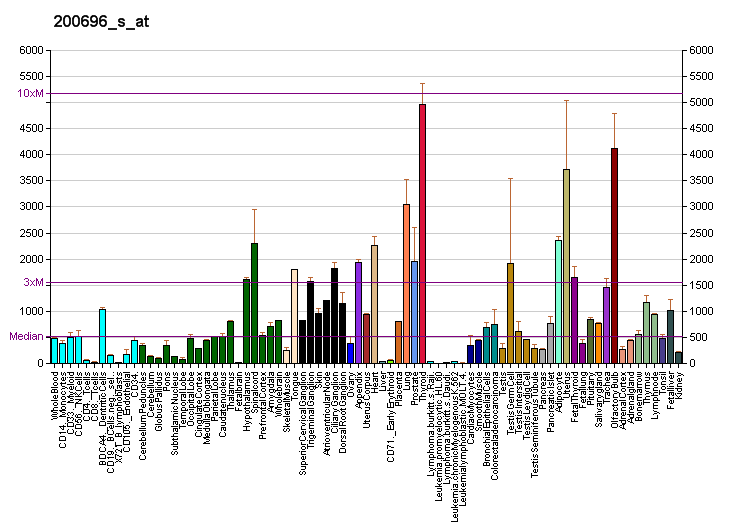
RNA expression pattern
Bgee	Human / Mouse (ortholog); n/a / Top expressed in: skin of external ear; subcutaneous adipose tissue; right lung; white adipose tissue; right lung lobe; tunica adventitia of aorta; stroma of bone marrow; left lung; superior surface of tongue; conjunctival fornix
BioGPS	More reference expression data
Gene ontology
Molecular function	metal ion binding; protein binding; actin binding; myosin II binding; calcium ion binding; actin filament binding
Cellular component	cytoplasm; cytosol; blood microparticle; plasma membrane; extracellular region; sarcoplasm; cortical actin cytoskeleton; actin cap; podosome; extracellular exosome; cytoskeleton; nucleus; secretory granule lumen; ficolin-1-rich granule lumen; ruffle; extracellular space; focal adhesion; actin cytoskeleton; lamellipodium; myelin sheath; perinuclear region of cytoplasm; protein-containing complex; phagocytic vesicle
Biological process	regulation of plasma membrane raft polarization; cilium assembly; sequestering of actin monomers; actin filament reorganization; amyloid fibril formation; positive regulation of keratinocyte apoptotic process; striated muscle atrophy; regulation of establishment of T cell polarity; extracellular matrix disassembly; positive regulation of cysteine-type endopeptidase activity involved in apoptotic signaling pathway; positive regulation of actin nucleation; regulation of receptor clustering; positive regulation of gene expression; cell projection organization; protein destabilization; actin filament capping; regulation of podosome assembly; renal protein absorption; hepatocyte apoptotic process; neutrophil degranulation; actin nucleation; actin filament severing; barbed-end actin filament capping; phagocytosis, engulfment; apoptotic process; ageing; actin polymerization or depolymerization; oligodendrocyte development; vesicle-mediated transport; actin filament polymerization; regulation of cell adhesion; wound healing; tissue regeneration; response to ethanol; phosphatidylinositol-mediated signaling; response to folic acid; cellular response to cadmium ion; positive regulation of protein processing in phagocytic vesicle; cellular response to interferon-gamma
Sources:Amigo / QuickGO
Orthologs
Databases	NCBI: entry; OMA: entry
Species	Human	Mouse
Entrez	2934	227753
Ensembl	ENSG00000148180	ENSMUSG00000026879
UniProt	P06396	P13020
RefSeq (mRNA)	NM_000177; NM_001127662; NM_001127663; NM_001127664; NM_001127665 NM_001127666; NM_001127667; NM_001258029; NM_001258030; NM_198252	NM_001206367; NM_001206368; NM_001206369; NM_146120; NM_001362945 NM_001362947; NM_001362948
RefSeq (protein)	NP_000168; NP_001121134; NP_001121135; NP_001121136; NP_001121137 NP_001121138; NP_001121139; NP_001244958; NP_001244959; NP_937895; NP_001339982; NP_001339983; NP_001339984; NP_001339985; NP_001339986; NP_001339987; NP_001339988; NP_001339989; NP_001339990; NP_001339991; NP_001339992; NP_001339993; NP_001339994; NP_001339995; NP_001339996; NP_001339997; NP_001339998; NP_001339999; NP_001340000; NP_001340001; NP_001340002; NP_001340003; NP_001340004; NP_001340005; NP_001340006; NP_001340007	NP_001193296; NP_001193297; NP_001193298; NP_666232; NP_001349874 NP_001349876; NP_001349877
Location (UCSC)	n/a	Chr 2: 35.15 – 35.2 Mb
PubMed search
- Wikidata
View/Edit Human	View/Edit Mouse

Gelsolin is an actin-binding protein that is a key regulator of actin filament assembly and disassembly. Gelsolin is one of the most potent members of the actin-severing gelsolin/villin superfamily, as it severs with nearly 100% efficiency.

Cellular gelsolin, found within the cytosol and mitochondria, has a closely related secreted form, plasma gelsolin, that contains an additional 24 AA N-terminal extension. Plasma gelsolin's ability to sever actin filaments helps the body recover from disease and injury that leaks cellular actin into the blood. Additionally it plays important roles in host innate immunity, activating macrophages and localizing of inflammation.

== Structure ==
Gelsolin is an 82-kD protein with six homologous subdomains, referred to as S1-S6. Each subdomain is composed of a five-stranded β-sheet, flanked by two α-helices, one positioned perpendicular with respect to the strands and one positioned parallel. The β-sheets of the three N-terminal subdomains (S1-S3) join to form an extended β-sheet, as do the β-sheets of the C-terminal subdomains (S4-S6).

== Regulation ==
Among the lipid-binding actin regulatory proteins, gelsolin (like cofilin) preferentially binds polyphosphoinositide (PPI). The binding sequences in gelsolin closely resemble the motifs in the other PPI-binding proteins.

Gelsolin's activity is stimulated by calcium ions (Ca^{2+}). Although the protein retains its overall structural integrity in both activated and deactivated states, the S6 helical tail moves like a latch depending on the concentration of calcium ions. The C-terminal end detects the calcium concentration within the cell. When there is no Ca^{2+} present, the tail of S6 shields the actin-binding sites on one of S2's helices. When a calcium ion attaches to the S6 tail, however, it straightens, exposing the S2 actin-binding sites. The N-terminal is directly involved in the severing of actin. S2 and S3 bind to the actin before the binding of S1 severs actin-actin bonds and caps the barbed end.

Gelsolin can be inhibited by a local rise in the concentration of phosphatidylinositol (4,5)-bisphosphate (PIP_{2}), a PPI. This is a two step process. Firstly, (PIP_{2}) binds to S2 and S3, inhibiting gelsolin from actin side binding. Then, (PIP_{2}) binds to gelsolin's S1, preventing gelsolin from severing actin, although (PIP_{2}) does not bind directly to gelsolin's actin-binding site.

Gelsolin's severing of actin, in contrast to the severing of microtubules by katanin, does not require any extra energy input.

== Cellular function ==
As an important actin regulator, gelsolin plays a role in podosome formation (along with Arp3, cortactin, and Rho GTPases).

Gelsolin also inhibits apoptosis by stabilizing the mitochondria. Prior to cell death, mitochondria normally lose membrane potential and become more permeable. Gelsolin can impede the release of cytochrome C, obstructing the signal amplification that would have led to apoptosis.

Actin can be cross-linked into a gel by actin cross-linking proteins. Gelsolin can turn this gel into a sol, hence the name gelsolin.

== Animal studies ==
Research in mice suggests that gelsolin, like other actin-severing proteins, is not expressed to a significant degree until after the early embryonic stage—approximately 2 weeks in murine embryos. In adult specimens, however, gelsolin is particularly important in motile cells, such as blood platelets. Mice with null gelsolin-coding genes undergo normal embryonic development, but the deformation of their blood platelets reduced their motility, resulting in a slower response to wound healing.

An insufficiency of gelsolin in mice has also been shown to cause increased permeability of the vascular pulmonary barrier, suggesting that gelsolin is important in the response to lung injury.

== Related proteins ==
Gelsolin-like domain
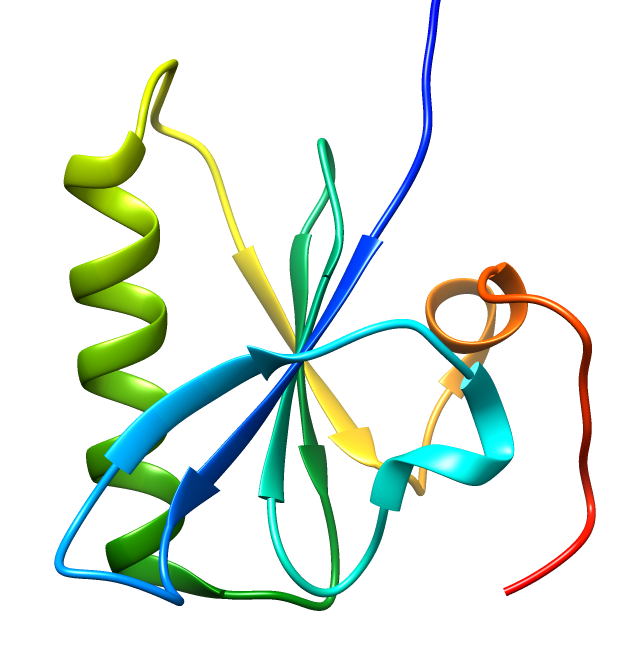
- 3FG7; Villin-1 domain 6: a gelsolin-like domain. The long helix is straight, consistent with the Ca^{2+}-activated form of gelsolin.

Identifiers
- Symbol: ?

Sequence comparisons indicate an evolutionary relationship between gelsolin, villin, fragmin, and severin. Six large repeating segments occur in gelsolin and villin, and 3 similar segments in severin and fragmin. The multiple repeats are related in structure (but barely in sequence) to the ADF-H domain, forming a superfamily (InterPro: IPR029006). The family appears to have evolved from an ancestral sequence of 120 to 130 amino acid residues.

Asgard archaea encode many functional gelsolins.

== Interactions ==
Gelsolin is a cytoplasmic, calcium-regulated, actin-modulating protein that binds to the barbed ends of actin filaments, preventing monomer exchange (end-blocking or capping). It can promote nucleation (the assembly of monomers into filaments), as well as sever existing filaments. In addition, this protein binds with high affinity to fibronectin. Plasma gelsolin and cytoplasmic gelsolin are derived from a single gene by alternate initiation sites and differential splicing.

Gelsolin has been shown to interact with:

- Amyloid precursor protein,
- Androgen receptor,
- PTK2B, and
- VDAC1.

== See also ==
- Plasma gelsolin
- Cortactin
- Villin
- Supervillin
- Finnish type amyloidosis
