= Calponin homology domain =

Calponin homology (CH) domain
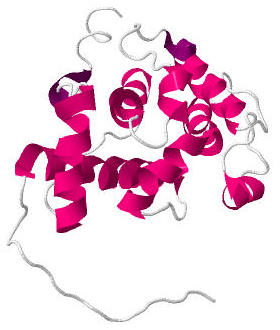
- Solution structure of calponin homology domain of IQGAP1

Identifiers
- Symbol: CH
- Pfam: PF00307
- InterPro: IPR001715
- SMART: CH
- PROSITE: PDOC00019
- SCOP2: 1aoa / SCOPe / SUPFAM
- CDD: cd00014
Available protein structures:
- PDB: 1sjjB:33-136 1tjtA:46-149 1wkuA:46-149 1sh5B:186-293 1sh6A:186-293 1mb8A:180-282 1dxxA:16-119 1qagB:32-135 1rt8A:386-495 1pxyB:393-498 1aoa :121-236 1wypA:29-132 1h67A:29-132 1wynA:29-132 1ujoA:25-138 1wymA:25-137 1wyrA:4-111 1p2xA:42-148 1p5sA:42-148 1bkrA:174-278 1aa2 :174-278 1wyqA:178-281 1bhdA:151-254 1wylA:509-612 1wjoA:517-624 1wyoA:15-116 1vkaB:15-116 1uegA:15-116 1pa7A:15-116 IPR001715 PF00307 (ECOD; PDBsum)
- AlphaFold: IPR001715; PF00307

Calponin homology domain (or CH domain) is a family of actin binding domains found in both cytoskeletal proteins and signal transduction proteins. The domain is about 100 amino acids in length and is composed of four alpha helices. It comprises the following groups of actin-binding domains:

- Actinin-type (including spectrin, fimbrin, ABP-280)
- Calponin-type

A comprehensive review of proteins containing this type of actin-binding domains is given in.

The CH domain is involved in actin binding in some members of the family. However, in calponins there is evidence that the CH domain is not involved in its actin binding activity. Most proteins have two copies of the CH domain, however some proteins such as calponin and the human vav proto-oncogene (P15498) have only a single copy. The structure of an example CH domain has been determined using X-ray crystallography.

== Examples ==
Human genes encoding calponin homology domain-containing proteins include:

- ACTN1, ACTN2, ACTN3, ACTN4, ARHGEF6, ARHGEF7, ASPM,
- CLMN, CNN1, CNN2, CNN3,
- DIXDC1, DMD, DST,
- EHBP1, EHBP1L1,
- FLNA, FLNB, FLNC,
- GAS2, GAS2L1, GAS2L2, GAS2L3,
- IQGAP1, IQGAP2, IQGAP3,
- LCP1, LIMCH1, LMO7, LRCH1, LRCH2, LRCH3, LRCH4,
- MACF1, MAPRE1, MAPRE2, MAPRE3, MICAL1, MICAL2, MICAL2PV1, MICAL2PV2, MICAL3, MICALL1, MICALL2,
- NAV2, NAV3,
- PARVA, PARVB, PARVG, PLEC1, PLS1, PLS3, PP14183,
- SMTN, SMTNL2, SPECC1, SPECC1L, SPNB4, SPTB, SPTBN1, SPTBN2, SPTBN4, SPTBN5, SYNE1, SYNE2,
- TAGLN, TAGLN2, TAGLN3,
- UTRN, and
- VAV1, VAV2, VAV3
