= MICAL =

MICAL may refer to:

- MICAL1, protein
- MICAL2, protein
- MICAL3, protein
- MICALL1, protein
- MICAL (Bahamas Parliament constituency)
