= Plastin =

Plastin is part of a family of actin-bundling proteins, specifically the α-actinin family of actin-binding protein, which are found in many lifeforms, from humans and other animals to plants and yeasts. These proteins are known to cross-link actin filaments into bundles for various cell purposes.

Plastin structure showing the headpiece, which contains the two EF-hand calcium-binding domains and two actin-binding domains (ABD) with two calponin homology (CH) domains in each ABD group.

Members of plastin include:

- LCP1
- PLS1
- PLS3

== Structure ==
The structure of plastin has been evolutionarily maintained within organisms who utilize this protein, which includes humans and lower eukaryotic organisms. Plastin structures are known for their EF-hand Ca^{2+}- and actin-binding domains that assist in assembling actin into higher-order bundles. Plastins have two actin-binding domains (ABD) in each of their polypeptide in which each ABD contains two of 125-residue calponin-homology (CH) components. This structure allows for plastins to cross-link actin filaments into their bundles in order to perform various tasks.

== Function ==
Plastin, along with other actin-binding proteins, help stabilize and rearrange organization of actin cytoskeleton when present with external stimuli, cell migration, and cell adhesion. The EF-hand Ca^{2+}-binding domains are important for the function of plastin as their activities are regulated by Ca^{2+}.

In mammals, three isoforms of plastin have been identified: L-plastin, found mostly within hematopoietic cells; T-plastin, found in cells of solid tissues; and lastly, I-plastin, expressed specifically in the small intestine, colon, and kidneys. Each of these isoforms of plastin have their own roles, dependent of the cell-type, in order to regulate the actin cytoskeleton.

=== L-plastin ===
L-plastin (leukocyte plastin, LPL, Plastin-2, LCP1), are expressed in hematopoietic cells and in various types of leukocytes (i.e., T- and B-lymphocytes). They help to defend against foreign pathogens by using phagocytosis. They help contribute to the motility of T-cells so that these cells are capable of activating during an immune response. L-plastins are known to be the only isoform within the three to undergo phosphorylation during leukocyte activation via interleukin-1, -2, and phorbol myristate acetate. This, and the fact that plastins are Ca^{2+}-dependent, allow L-plastins to be capable of signaling to leukocytes for rapid responses to stimuli. As a result, organisms or cells that are lacking L-plastins have a more difficult time responding to external stimuli that need an immunity activation.

=== T-Plastin ===
Depiction of protrusion of a cell using plastin within its membrane.

Also written PLS3 or Plastin-3, T-plastins are primarily found in solid tissues, within cells that are capable of replication (i.e., epithelial and mesenchymal cells). T-plastins are needed in order for cells to carry out proliferation and migration as well as membranes to protrude from cell to another cell and gap the distance within the extracellular matrix (ECM). These proteins strengthen the actin-cytoskeleton network to accomplish cell migration and distribution. Without T-plastin, cells who migrate using the protrusion method would not be able to bypass the membrane tension that needs to be overcome in order for protrusion to occur.

=== I-Plastin ===
Formation of actin bundles by recombinant I-plastin. Shown are electron micrographs of negatively stained F-actin incubated with I-plastin either in the absence of calcium (A) or in the presence of calcium (B).

I-plastin (intestinal plastin, plastin-1, PLS1) is localized to the intestinal epithelial cells, specifically in the intestinal brush border microvilli. I-plastin help to stabilize the intestinal brush border microvilli and its function. Without I-plastin, it has been observed that there was decreased transepithelial resistance, increased cellular turnover, and increased sensitivity to specific diseases in the intestines. Phenotypically, microvilli in the intestines lacking this protein were found to be shorter, constricted, not have profound rootlets, and have increased fragility.
