= CYP109B1 =

Enzyme

Identifiers
- Organism: Bacillus subtilis
- Symbol: CYP109B1
- Alt. symbols: cypE
- Orthologs: OMA: entry
- RefSeq (Prot): NP_389103.1
- UniProt: O34374

Other data
- Chromosome: Genomic: 1.29 - 1.29 Mb
Search for
- Structures: Swiss-model
- Domains: InterPro

Cytochrome P450 family 109 subfamily B member 1 (abbreviated CYP109B1) is a versatile prokaryote monooxygenase of CYP109 family originally from Bacillus subtilis, its three-dimensional protein crystal structure has been solved.
