= CYP109E1 =

Identifiers
- Organism: Bacillus megaterium
- Symbol: CYP109E1
- Orthologs: OMA: entry
- UniProt: D5DKI8
Search for
- Structures: Swiss-model
- Domains: InterPro

Cytochrome P450 family 109 subfamily E member 1 (abbreviated CYP109E1) is a prokaryote monooxygenase of CYP109 family originally from Bacillus megaterium, could atc as a 24- and 25-Hydroxylase for Cholesterol.
