= EB-3 =

EB-3 or EB3 may refer to:

- EB-3 visa, a U.S. immigrant visa preference category
- Gibson EB-3, an electric bass guitar
- EB3, a Honda E engine
- EB3, or MAPRE3, a protein
