= CYP147 family =

Family of cytochrome P450 enzymes

Cytochrome P450, family 147, also known as CYP147, is a cytochrome P450 monooxygenase family. The first gene identified in this family is the CYP147B1 from Streptomyces avermitilis. CYP147 is one of the only three P450 families shared in bacteria and archaea, the other two are CYP197 and CYP109.
