= CYP29 family =

Nematoda cytochrome P450 monooxygenase family

Cytochrome P450, family 29, also known as CYP29, is a nematoda cytochrome P450 monooxygenase family. The first gene identified in this family is the CYP29A3 from the Caenorhabditis elegans.

== Genes in C. elegans ==
Gene	Biological Functions	Protein Length	Ref
CYP29A1	pseudogene		
CYP29A2		503	
CYP29A3		503	
CYP29A4		502	
