= CYP2D7 =

Human pseudogene related to cytochrome P450

Identifiers
- Aliases: CYP2D7, CYP2D, CYP2D7AP, CYP2D7P1, CYP2D@, P450C2D, P450DB1, CYP2D7P, RNA40057, cytochrome P450 family 2 subfamily D member 7 (gene/pseudogene), CYP2D6
- External IDs: GeneCards: CYP2D7
Enzyme activity
EC #	BRENDA	ExPASy	KEGG	MetaCyc
1.14.14.1	↗	↗	↗	↗
RNA expression pattern
Bgee	Human / Mouse (ortholog); Top expressed in: right lobe of liver; liver; muscle tissue; brain; testicle; myometrium; pituitary gland / n/a; More reference expression data
BioGPS	n/a
Gene ontology
Molecular function	iron ion binding; oxidoreductase activity; aromatase activity; oxidoreductase activity, acting on paired donors, with incorporation or reduction of molecular oxygen, reduced flavin or flavoprotein as one donor, and incorporation of one atom of oxygen; heme binding; oxidoreductase activity, acting on paired donors, with incorporation or reduction of molecular oxygen; metal ion binding; monooxygenase activity; steroid hydroxylase activity
Cellular component	cytoplasm; integral component of membrane; membrane; mitochondrion; intracellular membrane-bounded organelle
Biological process	xenobiotic metabolic process; arachidonic acid metabolic process; organic acid metabolic process
Sources:Amigo / QuickGO
Orthologs
Databases	NCBI: entry
Species	Human	Mouse
Entrez	1564	n/a
Ensembl	n/a	n/a
UniProt	A0A087X1C5	n/a
RefSeq (mRNA)	NM_001348386; NM_001002910	n/a
RefSeq (protein)	NP_001335315	n/a
Location (UCSC)	n/a	n/a
PubMed search		n/a
- Wikidata
View/Edit Human

Cytochrome P450 2D7 (CYP2D7) is a member of the cytochrome P450 gene superfamily. The cytochrome P450 proteins are monooxygenases that catalyze many reactions involved in drug metabolism and the synthesis of cholesterol, steroids, and other lipids. CYP2D7 is a segregating pseudogene, meaning that some individuals may have an allele that encodes a functional enzyme, while others have an allele encoding a protein that is predicted to be non-functional. In this case, the functional allele is thought to be rare. This locus is part of a cluster of cytochrome P450 genes on chromosome 22.

== Gene ==
The CYP2D7 gene is located on chromosome 22, near other cytochrome P450 genes, including CYP2D6 and CYP2D8P. CYP2D7 is considered a pseudogene, which means it is a non-functional gene that has lost its protein-coding ability or is not expressed. However, some individuals may possess a rare functional allele of CYP2D7, which can encode a functional enzyme.

== Function and significance ==
CYP2D7 is closely related to CYP2D6, a gene that encodes an enzyme responsible for the metabolism of approximately 25% of clinically used drugs. The functional significance of CYP2D7 is not well understood due to its pseudogene status. However, its proximity to CYP2D6 and its potential rare functional variants make it an interesting subject for genetic and pharmacological studies.

== Genetic variability ==
The genetic variability of CYP2D7 is not as extensively studied as that of CYP2D6. However, given its location within the cytochrome P450 gene cluster on chromosome 22, it is subject to similar genetic variations and polymorphisms. The presence of a functional allele of CYP2D7 in some individuals suggests that there may be ethnic and individual differences in its expression and function.

== Clinical relevance ==
While CYP2D7 is primarily considered a pseudogene, the potential presence of functional alleles in some individuals could have implications for drug metabolism and response. Understanding the genetic variability of CYP2D7 may provide insights into personalized medicine and pharmacogenomics, particularly in the context of drug metabolism and potential drug-drug interactions.
