= CYP25 family =

Cytochrome P450, family 25, also known as CYP25, is a nematoda cytochrome P450 monooxygenase family. The first gene identified in this family is the CYP25A1 from the Caenorhabditis elegans.

== Genes in C. elegans ==
| Gene | Biological Functions | Protein Length | Ref |
|---|---|---|---|
| CYP25A1 | | 502 | |
| CYP25A2 | | 502 | |
| CYP25A3 | | 502 | |
| CYP25A4 | | 501 | |
| CYP25A5 | pseudogene | | |
| CYP25A6 | | 236 | |
