= FMN reductase (NADH) =

Enzyme

Identifiers
- EC no.: 1.5.1.42

Databases
- IntEnz: IntEnz view
- BRENDA: BRENDA entry
- ExPASy: NiceZyme view
- KEGG: KEGG entry
- MetaCyc: metabolic pathway
- PRIAM: profile
- PDB structures: RCSB PDB PDBe PDBsum
Search
- PMC: articles
- PubMed: articles
- NCBI: proteins

FMN reductase (NADH) (EC 1.5.1.42, NADH-FMN reductase) is an enzyme with systematic name FMNH_{2}:NAD^{+} oxidoreductase. This enzyme catalyses the following chemical reaction

FMNH_{2} + NAD^{+} $\rightleftharpoons$ FMN + NADH + H^{+}

The enzyme often forms a complex with monooxygenases.
