= LUZP2 =

Identifiers
- Aliases: LUZP2, KFSP2566, PRO6246, leucine zipper protein 2
- External IDs: OMIM: 608178; MGI: 1889615; GeneCards: LUZP2

Gene location (Human)
Chr.	Chromosome 11 (human)
Band	11p14.3	Start	24,496,970 bp
Band	11p14.3	End	25,082,638 bp

Gene location (Mouse)
Chr.	Chromosome 7 (mouse)
Band	7 B5|7 33.23 cM	Start	54,485,246 bp
Band	7 B5|7 33.23 cM	End	54,918,633 bp
RNA expression pattern
Bgee	Human / Mouse (ortholog); Top expressed in: hypothalamus; C1 segment; amygdala; right adrenal cortex; substantia nigra; cingulate gyrus; anterior cingulate cortex; left adrenal gland; left adrenal cortex; corpus callosum / Top expressed in: cerebellar cortex; Cortex of frontal lobe; visual cortex; olfactory bulb; superior frontal gyrus; primary visual cortex; hippocampus proper; dentate gyrus of hippocampal formation granule cell; hypothalamus; striatum of neuraxis; More reference expression data
BioGPS	n/a
Orthologs
Databases	NCBI: entry; OMA: entry
Species	Human	Mouse
Entrez	338645	233271
Ensembl	ENSG00000187398	ENSMUSG00000063297
UniProt	Q86TE4	Q8BGY3
RefSeq (mRNA)	NM_001009909; NM_001252008; NM_001252010	NM_178705
RefSeq (protein)	NP_001009909; NP_001238937; NP_001238939	NP_848820
Location (UCSC)	Chr 11: 24.5 – 25.08 Mb	Chr 7: 54.49 – 54.92 Mb
PubMed search
- Wikidata
View/Edit Human	View/Edit Mouse

Leucine zipper protein 2 is a protein that in humans is encoded by the LUZP2 gene. There are no orthologs in invertebrates, but many in vertebrates.

== Gene ==
The LUZP2 gene is found on the short arm of chromosome 11 at position 11p14.3. It is located on the plus strand.

The gene contains 23 introns, and can produce 11 alternatively spliced mRNAs.

== Protein structure ==
LUZP2 encodes a leucine zipper protein that is 346 amino acids in length, and has a molecular weight of ~39 kDa. This protein is secreted, and is found mostly expressed within the brain and spinal cord.

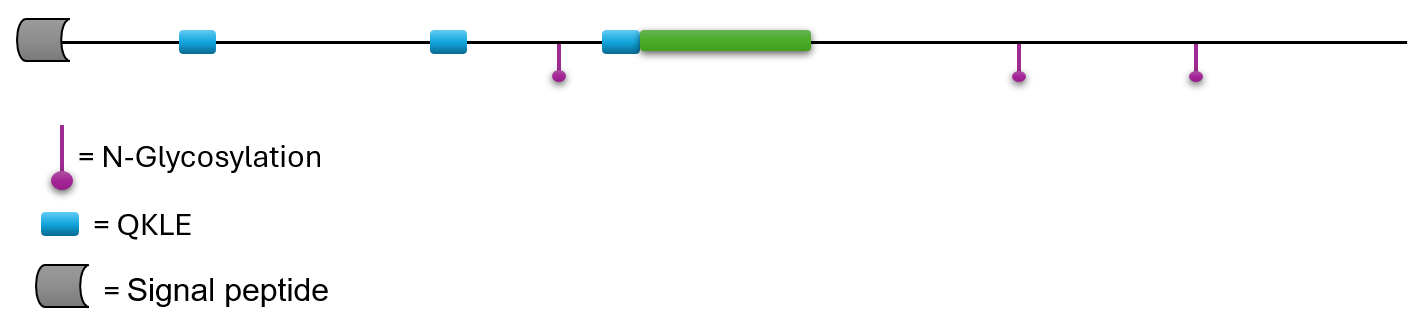
Diagram of LUZP2 modification sites. The green bar is the area of the leucine zipper region.

The protein contains a signal peptide, 3 glycosylation sites, a leucine zipper region, and a disordered region. It also contains 3 highly conserved "QLKE" amino acid repeats.

=== Leucine zipper ===
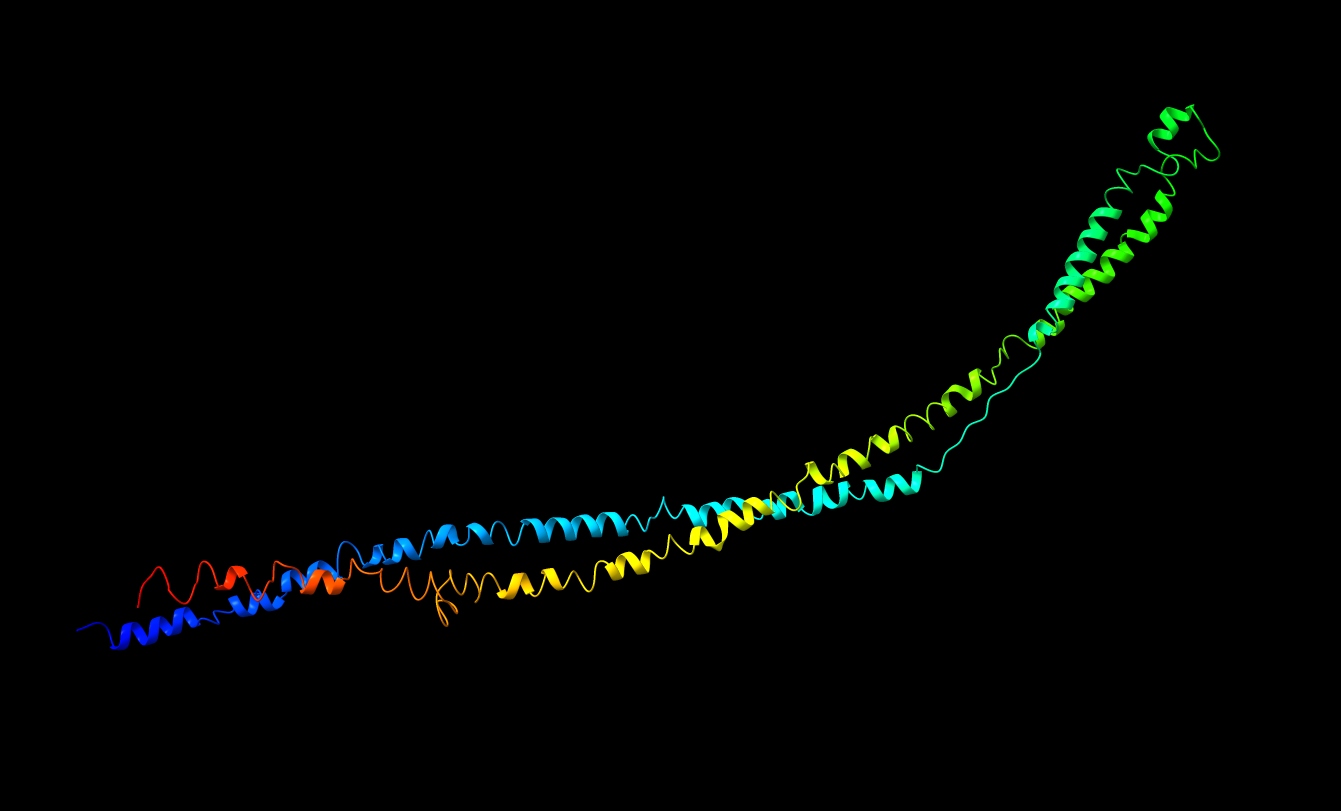
Predicted structure of LUZP2 using I-TASSER

The leucine zipper motif is located on positions 164-192 of the protein, and contains 4 conserved lysine and 4 conserved leucine residues. Leucine zippers usually facilitate protein-protein interactions and contain many amphipathic helices that form a left-handed dimeric coiled-coil structure. They also often contain leucine residues spaced 7 amino acids apart.

== Abundance ==
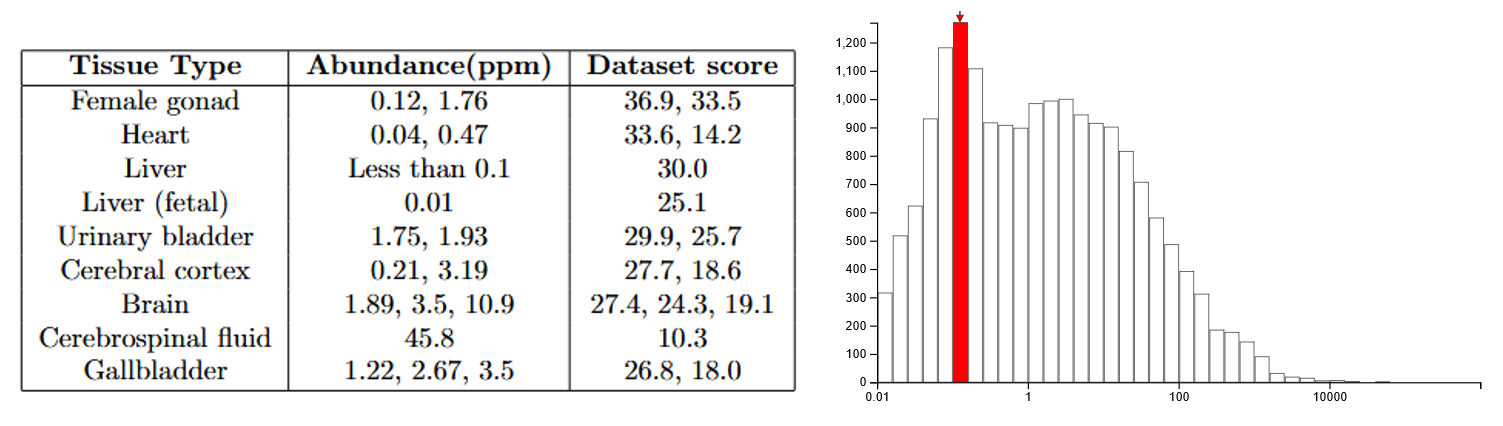
Protein abundance values of LUZP2 in various tissues in H. sapiens according to PaxDb. Abundance in parts per million. Relative protein abundance histogram from PaxDb. LUZP2 is shown the red bin.

=== Protein Abundance ===
LUZP2 protein is present in higher amounts than most proteins, but is more abundant in the cerebral cortex and brain. Immunohistochemical staining using anti-LUZP2 rabbit antibodies shows it to be present in low levels in the pancreas and high in the cerebral cortex. Interestingly, it is present in high levels in neuronal projections, suggesting it could have some role in the development of the vertebral nervous system.

=== In situ hybridization ===
Based on in situ hybridization studies, LUZP2 mRNA is expressed at low levels throughout the brain, but more highly concentrated in the regions of the forebrain, the thalamus, and the hypothalamus. LUZP2 is also least expressed in the cerebellum compared to other structures.

== Clinical findings ==
Based on a data mining study investigating low-grade Gliomas, LUZP2 downregulation was found to be associated with higher-grade tumors, suggesting that LUZP2 expression decreased as tumors became more aggressive. Low LUZP2 expression was also associated with worse overall survival in patients with low-grade gliomas across multiple cohorts.

This gene has also been found deleted in some patients with Wilms tumor-aniridia-ganomalies-mental retardation (WAGR) syndrome.

== Evolution ==
LUZP2 has many orthologs in vertebrates. It is highly conserved in mammals, birds, and reptiles.

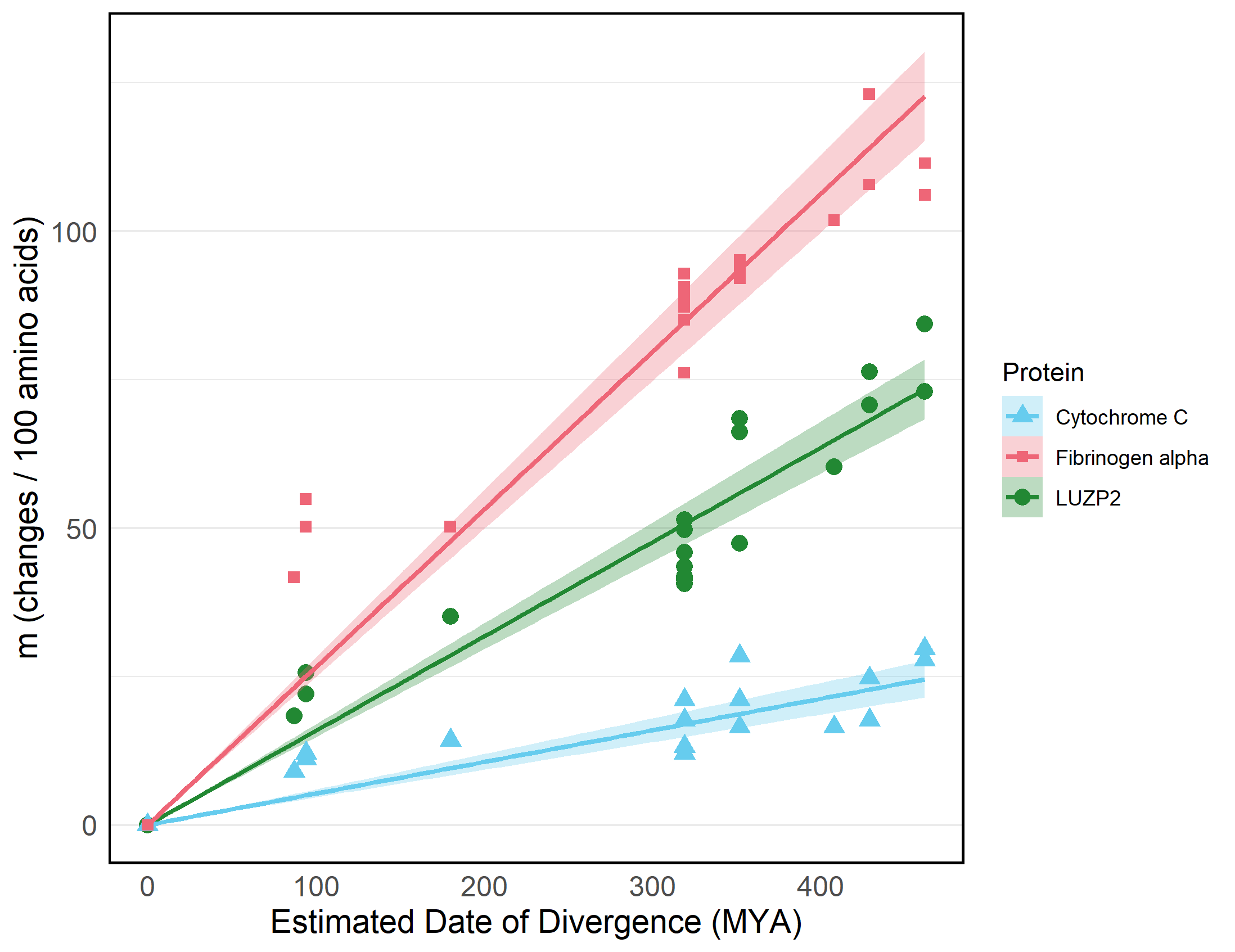
Evolutionary rate of LUZP2 compared to Fibrinogen alpha and Cytochrome c.

LUZP2 is expected to have first appeared in cartilaginous fish around 462 million years ago, and is evolving at an intermediate rate, slower than fibrinogen alpha, but faster than cytochrome c.

LUZP2	Genus and Species	Common Name	Taxonomic Order	Median Date of Divergence (MYA)	Accession #	Sequence Length (aa)	Sequence Identity to Human Protein (%)	Sequence Similarity to Human Protein (%)
Mammals	Homo sapiens	Human	Primates	0	NP_001009909.2	346	100.0	100.0
	Mesocricetus auratus	Golden hamster	Rodentia	87	XP_040589238.1	345	83.2	89.6
	Ursus arctos	Brown bear	Carnivora	94	XP_048073596.2	347	80.2	89.1
	Dromiciops gliroides	Colocolo opossum	Marsupialia	160	XP_043829349.1	345	70.9	79.8
	Ornithorhynchus anatinus	Platypus	Monotremata	180	XP_028914921.1	347	70.4	80.2
Birds	Cygnus olor	Mute swan	Anseriformes	319	XP_040415405.1	343	67.1	76.6
	Gallus gallus	Red junglefowl	Galliformes	319	NP_001186450.1	344	66.2	74.9
	Falco cherrug	Saker falcon	Falconiformes	319	XP_027654513.1	314	66.2	74.3
	Corvus brachyrhynchos	American crow	Passeriformes	319	XP_017581874.1	352	65.8	73.7
Reptiles	Dermochelys coriacea	Leatherback sea turtle	Testudines	319	XP_038262088.1	343	66.6	75.2
	Notechis scutatus	Mainland tiger snake	Squamta	319	XP_026520543.1	336	63.2	72.2
	Varanus komodoensis	Komodo dragon	Squamata	319	XP_044282044.1	364	59.8	71.0
	Alligator mississippiensis	American alligator	Crocodilia	319	XP_019332548.2	425	55.9	62.9
Amphibians	Rhinatrema bivittatum	Two-lined caecilian	Gymnophiona	352	XP_029438260.1	342	62.2	74.9
	Xenopus laevis	African clawed frog	Anura	352	XP_018113009.1	344	60.6	72.1
	Pleurodeles waltl	Iberian ribbed newt	Urodela	352	XP_069078053.1	348	59.7	71.4
Fishes	Protopterus annectens	West african lungfish	Ceratodontiformes	408	XP_043939274.1	349	54.7	67.6
	Periophthalmus magnuspinnatus	Mudskipper	Gobiiformes	429	XP_033847668.1	347	46.6	59.6
	Danio rerio	Zebrafish	Cypriniformes	429	NP_001108187.1	346	49.3	60.3
	Amblyraja radiata	Thorny skate	Rajiformes	462	XP_032894536.1	306	43.0	57.9
	Carcharodon carcharias	Great white shark	Lamniformes	462	XP_041052683.1	307	48.2	61.0

== Possible Interactions ==
LUZP2 mostly interacts with proteins found the nucleus. Proteins that showed the most promising interactions with LUZP2 include the serine/threonine kinase TNIK, GAS2, and CBX5.

Protein	Function	Location	Method	Source
c-Src Tyrosine Kinase (CSK)	Regulation of embryonic development and cell growth	Many, including nucleus	Synthetic lethality	BioGRID
Heterogenous Ribonucleoprotein L (HBRNPL)	Nucelocytoplasmic export	Nucleus, extracellular	Affinity capture-RNA	BioGRID
Chromobox 5 (CBX5)	Formation of kinetochores and heterochromatin	Nucleus	Tandem affinity purification	IntAct
Estrogen-receptor 1 (ESR1)	Nuclear hormone receptor	Many, including nucleus	Affinity chromography technology	IntAct
TRAF2 and NCK Interacting Kinase (TNIK)	Ser/thr kinase that activates Wnt signaling pathway	Many, including nucleus	Two hybrid fragment pooling approaching	IntAct
Growth Arrest Specific 2 (GAS2)	Microfilament dynamics during cell cycle and apoptosis	Cytosol, cytoskeleton	Co-expression, Co-mentioned in Pubmed abstracts	STRING
Family With Sequence Similarity 81 Member A (FAM81A)	Enables protein binding	Cytosol, nucleus	Co-expression, Co-mentioned in Pubmed abstracts	STRING
Cyclic AMP-Responsive Element-Binding Protein 3 (CREB3)	Leucine-zipper protein, binds cAMP-response elements and regulates proliferation	Golgi, cytosol, endoplasmic reticulum, nucleus	Co-mentioned in Pubmed abstracts	STRING
Ankyrin Repeat Domain 55 (ANKRD55)	Enables protein binding	Nucleus	Co-mentioned in Pubmed abstracts	STRING
Clathrin Heavy Chain Linker Domain Containing 1 (CLHC1)	Enables protein binding	Cytosol, nucleus	Co-mentioned in Pubmed abstracts	STRING
Zinc Finger DHHC-Type Palmitoyltransferase 19 (ZDHHC19)	Mediates palmitoylation proteins such as RRAS and SQSTM1, positively regualtes autophagy	Golgi, endoplasmic reticulum, nucleus, plasma membrane	Co-mentioned in PubMed abstract	STRING
