= CYP139 family =

Group of cytochrome P450 enzymes

Cytochrome P450, family 139, also known as CYP139, is a cytochrome P450 monooxygenase family in bacteria. The first gene identified in this family is CYP139A1 from Mycobacterium tuberculosis. Most member of this family belonged to the subfamily A, and involved in the synthesis of secondary metabolites in many mycobacterial species.
