= (+)-Camphor 6-exo-hydroxylase =

Class of enzymes

Identifiers
- EC no.: 1.14.13.161

Databases
- IntEnz: IntEnz view
- BRENDA: BRENDA entry
- ExPASy: NiceZyme view
- KEGG: KEGG entry
- MetaCyc: metabolic pathway
- PRIAM: profile
- PDB structures: RCSB PDB PDBe PDBsum
Search
- PMC: articles
- PubMed: articles
- NCBI: proteins

(+)-Camphor 6-exo-hydroxylase (EC 1.14.13.161, (+)-camphor 6-hydroxylase) is an enzyme with systematic name (+)-camphor,NADPH:oxygen oxidoreductase (6-exo-hydroxylating). This enzyme catalyses the following chemical reaction

(+)-camphor + NADPH + H^{+} + O_{2} $\rightleftharpoons$ (+)-6-exo-hydroxycamphor + NADP^{+} + H_{2}O

(+)-Camphor 6-exo-hydroxylase is a cytochrome P-450 monooxygenase isolated from Salvia officinalis.
