= CYP14 family =

Group of cytochrome P450 enzymes

Cytochrome P450, family 14, also known as CYP14, is a nematoda cytochrome P450 monooxygenase family. The first gene identified in this family is the CYP14A1 from the Caenorhabditis elegans. The function of most genes in this family is unknown.

== Genes in C. elegans ==
| Gene | Biological Functions | Protein Length | Ref |
|---|---|---|---|
| CYP14A1 | | 491 | |
| CYP14A2 | | 492 | |
| CYP14A3 | | 498 | |
| CYP14A4 | | 491 | |
| CYP14A5 | | 492 | |
