= CYP197 family =

Family of cytochrome P450 enzymes

Cytochrome P450, family 197, also known as CYP197, is a cytochrome P450 monooxygenase family. The first gene identified in this family is the CYP197A1 from Bacillus halodurans. CYP197 is one of the only three P450 families shared in bacteria and archaea, the other two are CYP147 and CYP109. Genes in this family are co-present on archaeal plasmids and chromosomes, implying the plasmid-mediated horizontal gene transfer of these genes from bacteria to archaea.
