= Plectin =

Mammalian protein found in Homo sapiens

PLEC
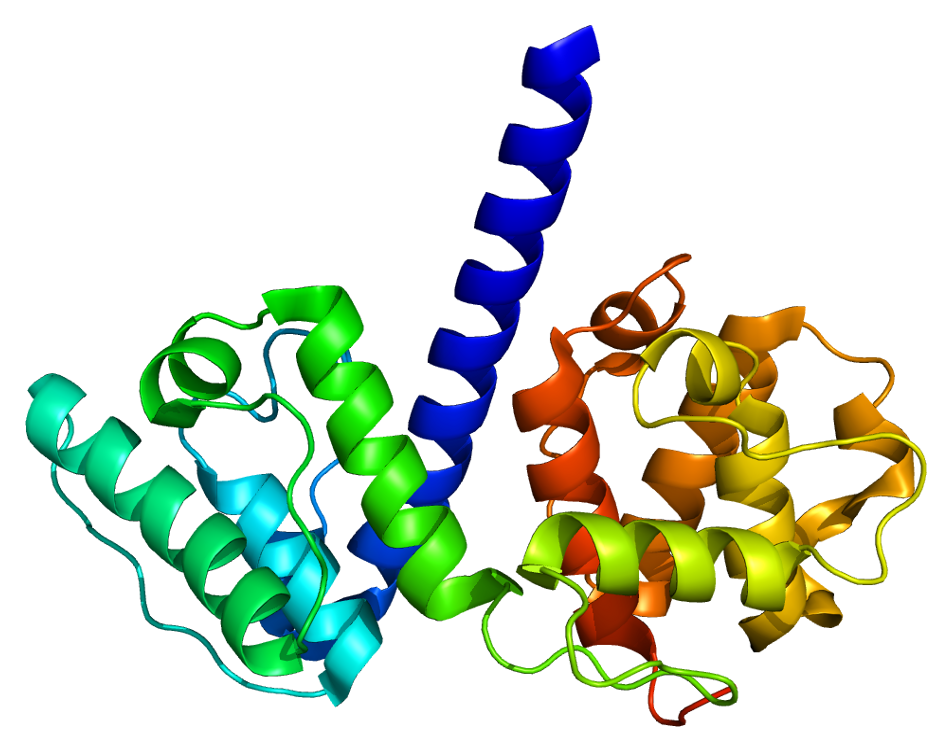

Identifiers
- Aliases: PLEC, EBS1, EBSMD, EBSND, EBSO, EBSOG, EBSPA, HD1, LGMD2Q, PCN, PLEC1, PLEC1b, PLTN, plectin, LGMDR17, EBS5D, EBS5C, EBS5B, EBS5A
- External IDs: OMIM: 601282; MGI: 1277961; GeneCards: PLEC
Available structures
PDB	Ortholog search: PDBe RCSB
PDB	List of PDB id codes 1MB8, 2ODU, 2ODV, 3F7P, 3PDY, 3PE0, 4GDO, 4Q58, 4Q59, 2N03, 5J1H, 5J1G, 5J1I

Gene location (Human)
Chr.	Chromosome 8 (human)
Band	8q24.3	Start	143,915,153 bp
Band	8q24.3	End	143,976,734 bp

Gene location (Mouse)
Chr.	Chromosome 15 (mouse)
Band	15 D3|15 35.48 cM	Start	76,055,174 bp
Band	15 D3|15 35.48 cM	End	76,116,774 bp
RNA expression pattern
Bgee	Human / Mouse (ortholog); Top expressed in: sural nerve; muscle of thigh; gastrocnemius muscle; stromal cell of endometrium; apex of heart; body of tongue; right coronary artery; gastric mucosa; nipple; Skeletal muscle tissue of rectus abdominis / Top expressed in: ankle; internal carotid artery; external carotid artery; soleus muscle; temporal muscle; endothelial cell of lymphatic vessel; digastric muscle; triceps brachii muscle; vastus lateralis muscle; sternocleidomastoid muscle; More reference expression data
BioGPS	n/a
Gene ontology
Molecular function	protein binding; ankyrin binding; actin binding; structural constituent of muscle; RNA binding; cytoskeletal protein binding; cadherin binding; structural molecule activity; structural constituent of cytoskeleton
Cellular component	focal adhesion; plasma membrane; hemidesmosome; cell junction; brush border; sarcoplasm; contractile fiber; sarcolemma; costamere; intermediate filament cytoskeleton; extracellular exosome; cytoskeleton; extracellular matrix; cytoplasm; cytosol; intermediate filament; membrane; perinuclear region of cytoplasm
Biological process	hemidesmosome assembly; cytoskeleton organization; wound healing; intermediate filament cytoskeleton organization
Sources:Amigo / QuickGO
Orthologs
Databases	NCBI: entry; OMA: entry
Species	Human	Mouse
Entrez	5339	18810
Ensembl	ENSG00000178209	ENSMUSG00000022565
UniProt	Q15149	Q9QXS1
RefSeq (mRNA)	NM_000445; NM_201378; NM_201379; NM_201380; NM_201381 NM_201382; NM_201383; NM_201384	NM_001163540; NM_001163542; NM_001163549; NM_001164203; NM_011117 NM_201385; NM_201386; NM_201387; NM_201388; NM_201389; NM_201390; NM_201391; NM_201392; NM_201393; NM_201394
RefSeq (protein)	NP_000436; NP_958780; NP_958781; NP_958782; NP_958783 NP_958784; NP_958785; NP_958786	NP_001157012; NP_001157014; NP_001157021; NP_001157675; NP_035247 NP_958787; NP_958788; NP_958789; NP_958790; NP_958791; NP_958792; NP_958793; NP_958794; NP_958795; NP_958796
Location (UCSC)	Chr 8: 143.92 – 143.98 Mb	Chr 15: 76.06 – 76.12 Mb
PubMed search
- Wikidata
View/Edit Human	View/Edit Mouse

Plectin is a giant protein found in nearly all mammalian cells which acts as a link between the three main components of the cytoskeleton: actin microfilaments, microtubules and intermediate filaments. In addition, plectin links the cytoskeleton to junctions found in the plasma membrane that structurally connect different cells. By holding these different networks together, plectin plays an important role in maintaining the mechanical integrity and viscoelastic properties of tissues.

== Structure ==
Plectin can exist in cells as several alternatively-spliced isoforms, all around 500 kDa and >4000 amino acids. The structure of plectin is thought to be a dimer consisting of a central coiled coil of alpha helices connecting two large globular domains (one at each terminus). These globular domains are responsible for connecting plectin to its various cytoskeletal targets. The carboxy-terminal domain is made of 6 highly homologous repeating regions. The subdomain between regions five and six of this domain is known to connect to the intermediate filaments cytokeratin and vimentin. At the opposite end of the protein, in the N-terminal domain, a region has been defined as responsible for binding to actin. In 2004, the exact crystal structure of this actin-binding domain (ABD) was determined in mice and shown to be composed of two calponin homology (CH) domains. Plectin is expressed in nearly all mammalian tissues. In cardiac muscle and skeletal muscle, plectin is localized to specialized entities known as Z-discs. Plectin binds several proteins, including vinculin, DES, actin, fodrin, microtubule-associating proteins, nuclear laminin B, SPTAN1, vimentin and ITGB4.

== Function ==
Studies employing a plectin knockout mouse have shed light on the functions of plectin. Pups died 2–3 days after birth, and these mice exhibited marked skin abnormalities, including degeneration of keratinocytes. Skeletal and cardiac muscle tissues were also significantly affected. Cardiac intercalated discs were disintegrated and sarcomeres were irregularly shapen, and intracellular accumulation of aberrant isolated myofibrillar bundles and Z-disc components was also observed. Expression of vinculin in muscle cells was strikingly down-regulated. Through the use of gold-immunoelectron microscopy, immunoblotting and immunofluorescence experiments plectin has been found to associate with all three major components of the cytoskeleton. In muscle, plectin binds to the periphery of Z-discs, and along with the intermediate filament protein desmin, may form lateral linkages among neighboring Z-discs. This interaction between plectin and desmin intermediate filaments also appears to facilitate the close association of myofibrils and mitochondria, both at Z-discs and along the remainder the sarcomere. Plectin also functions to link cytoskeleton to intercellular junctions, such as desmosomes and hemidesmosomes, which link intermediate filament networks between cells. Plectin has been revealed to localize to the desmosomes and in vitro studies have shown that it can form bridges between the desmosome protein, desmoplakin and intermediate filaments. In hemidesmosomes plectin has been shown to interact with the integrin β4 subunits of the hemidesmosome plaque and function in a clamp-like manner to link the intermediate filament cytokeratin to the junction.

== Clinical significance ==
Mutations in PLEC have been associated with epidermolysis bullosa simplex with muscular dystrophy. A missense variant of PLEC has been recently proposed as a cause of atrial fibrillation in some populations. Isolated left ventricular non-compaction accompanying epidermolysis bullosa simplex with muscular dystrophy was also noted. Plectin has been proposed as a biomarker for pancreatic cancer. Although normally a cytoplasmic protein, plectin is expressed on the cell membrane in pancreatic ductal adenocarcinoma (PDAC) and can therefore be used to target PDAC cells.

== See also ==
- List of target antigens in pemphigus
