= ABM domain =

ABM
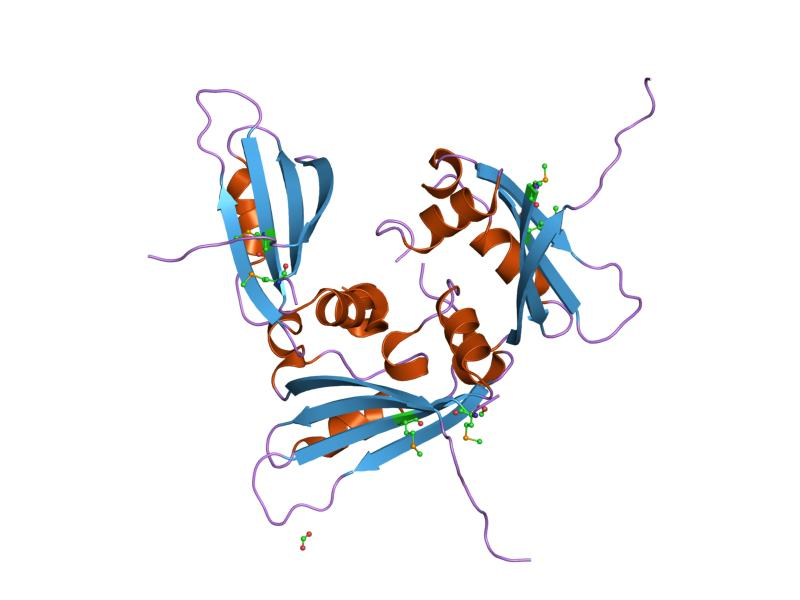
- crystal structure of putative antibiotic biosynthesis monooxygenase from bacillus cereus

Identifiers
- Symbol: ABM
- Pfam: PF03992
- Pfam clan: CL0032
- InterPro: IPR007138
- SCOP2: 1n5t / SCOPe / SUPFAM
Available protein structures:
- PDB: IPR007138 PF03992 (ECOD; PDBsum)
- AlphaFold: IPR007138; PF03992

In molecular biology, the ABM domain is a protein domain found in monooxygenases. These enzymes are involved in the biosynthesis of several antibiotics by Streptomyces species and can perform oxygenation without the assistance of any of the prosthetic groups, metal ions or cofactors typically associated with activation of molecular oxygen. The structure of ActVA-Orf6 monooxygenase from Streptomyces coelicolor, which is involved in actinorhodin biosynthesis, reveals a dimeric alpha+beta barrel topology. There is also a conserved histidine that is likely to be an active site residue. In the S. coelicolor protein SCO1909 this domain occurs as a repeat.
