= LCP1 =

Protein-coding gene in the species Homo sapiens

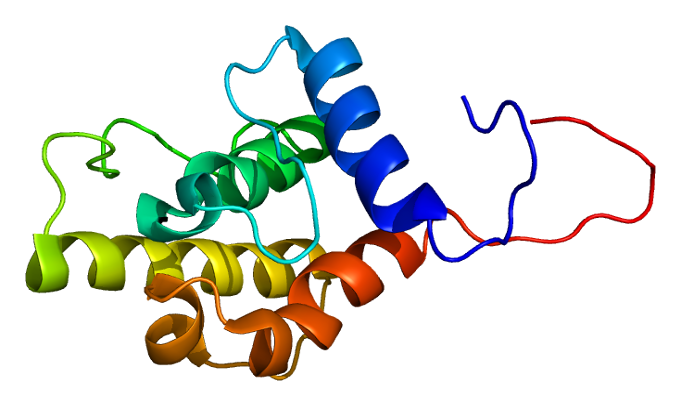

Identifiers
- Aliases: LCP1, CP64, HEL-S-37, L-PLASTIN, LC64P, LPL, PLS2, lymphocyte cytosolic protein 1
- External IDs: OMIM: 153430; MGI: 104808; GeneCards: LCP1
Available structures
PDB	Ortholog search: PDBe RCSB
PDB	List of PDB id codes 2D85

Gene location (Human)
Chr.	Chromosome 13 (human)
Band	13q14.13	Start	46,125,920 bp
Band	13q14.13	End	46,211,871 bp

Gene location (Mouse)
Chr.	Chromosome 14 (mouse)
Band	14 D3|14 39.63 cM	Start	75,368,541 bp
Band	14 D3|14 39.63 cM	End	75,468,282 bp
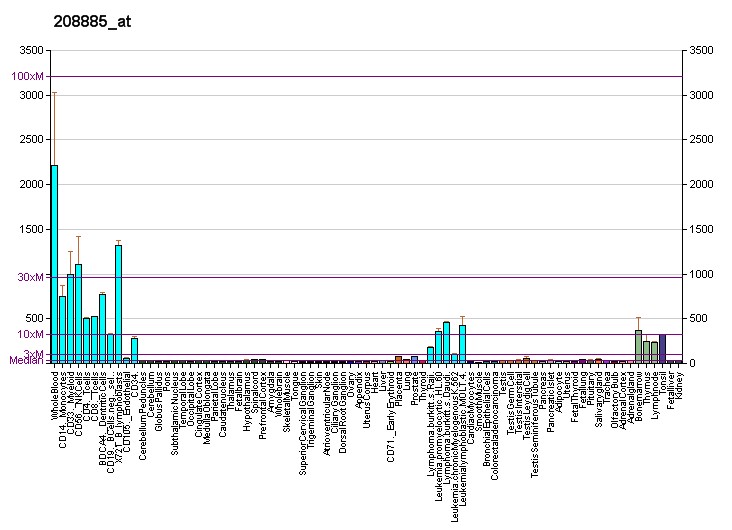
RNA expression pattern
Bgee	Human / Mouse (ortholog); Top expressed in: monocyte; granulocyte; blood; bone marrow cell; spleen; appendix; corpus epididymis; trabecular bone; gallbladder; right lung / Top expressed in: granulocyte; spleen; tibiofemoral joint; mesenteric lymph nodes; thymus; stroma of bone marrow; yolk sac; parotid gland; blood; seminal vesicula; More reference expression data
BioGPS	More reference expression data
Gene ontology
Molecular function	calcium ion binding; metal ion binding; actin filament binding; identical protein binding; GTPase binding; actin binding; integrin binding
Cellular component	cytoplasm; cytosol; cell projection; membrane; focal adhesion; filopodium; ruffle; plasma membrane; stress fiber; ruffle membrane; actin filament; actin cytoskeleton; actin filament bundle; podosome; phagocytic cup; extracellular exosome; cytoskeleton; extracellular space; cell junction; perinuclear region of cytoplasm
Biological process	extracellular matrix disassembly; positive regulation of podosome assembly; actin filament bundle assembly; regulation of intracellular protein transport; animal organ regeneration; protein kinase A signaling; cell migration; wound healing, spreading of cells; T cell activation involved in immune response; actin filament network formation; actin crosslink formation; interleukin-12-mediated signaling pathway
Sources:Amigo / QuickGO
Orthologs
Databases	NCBI: entry; OMA: entry
Species	Human	Mouse
Entrez	3936	18826
Ensembl	ENSG00000136167	ENSMUSG00000021998
UniProt	P13796	Q61233
RefSeq (mRNA)	NM_002298	NM_001247984; NM_008879
RefSeq (protein)	NP_002289; NP_002289.2	NP_001234913; NP_032905
Location (UCSC)	Chr 13: 46.13 – 46.21 Mb	Chr 14: 75.37 – 75.47 Mb
PubMed search
- Wikidata
View/Edit Human	View/Edit Mouse

Plastin-2 is a protein that in humans is encoded by the LCP1 gene.

== Function ==
Plastins are a family of actin-binding proteins that are conserved throughout eukaryote evolution and expressed in most tissues of higher eukaryotes. In humans, two ubiquitous plastin isoforms (L and T) have been identified. Plastin 1 (otherwise known as fimbrin) is a third distinct plastin isoform which is specifically expressed at high levels in the small intestine. The L isoform is expressed only in hemopoietic cell lineages, while the T isoform has been found in all other normal cells of solid tissues that have replicative potential (fibroblasts, endothelial cells, epithelial cells, melanocytes, etc.). However, L-plastin has been found in many types of malignant human cells of non-hemopoietic origin suggesting that its expression is induced accompanying tumorigenesis in solid tissues.
