= PARVB =

Protein-coding gene in the species Homo sapiens

Available structures
PDB	Ortholog search: PDBe RCSB
PDB	List of PDB id codes 4EDL, 4EDM, 4EDN

Identifiers
- Aliases: PARVB, CGI-56, parvin beta
- External IDs: OMIM: 608121; MGI: 2153063; HomoloGene: 8342; GeneCards: PARVB; OMA:PARVB - orthologs

Gene location (Human)
Chr.	Chromosome 22 (human)
Band	22q13.31	Start	43,999,211 bp
Band	22q13.31	End	44,172,939 bp

Gene location (Mouse)
Chr.	Chromosome 15 (mouse)
Band	15|15 E2	Start	84,116,244 bp
Band	15|15 E2	End	84,199,889 bp
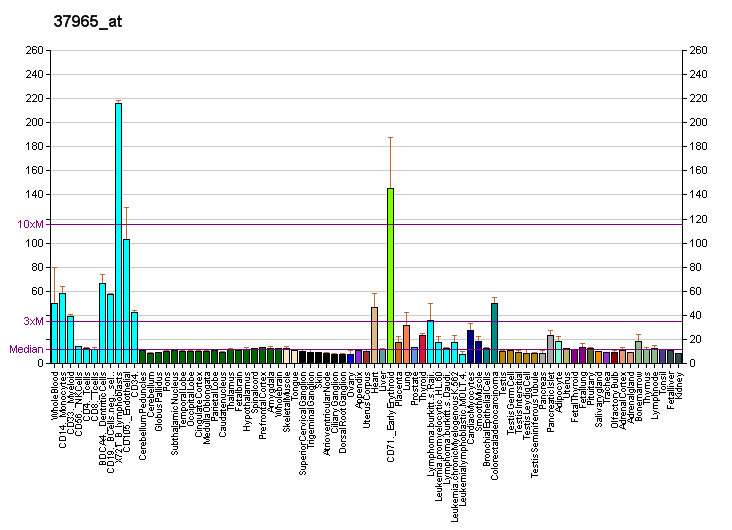

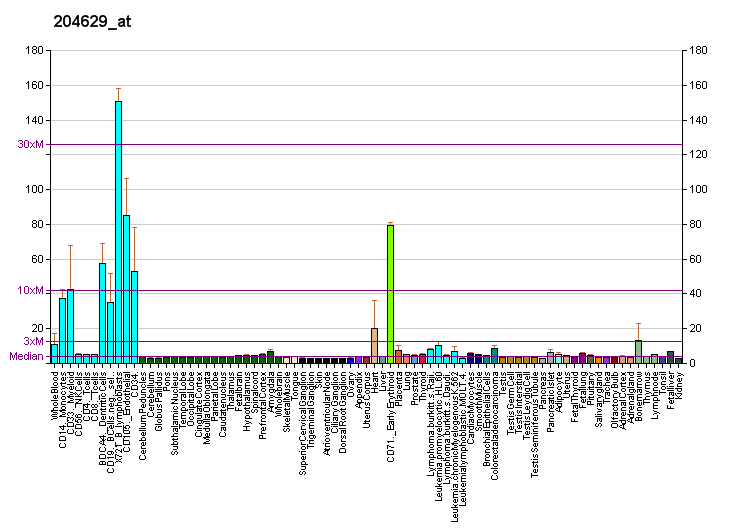

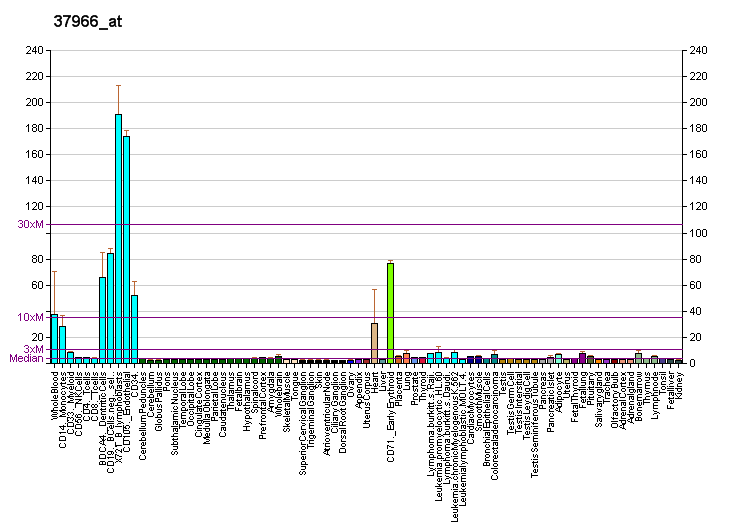
RNA expression pattern
Bgee	Human / Mouse (ortholog); Top expressed in: muscle of thigh; gastrocnemius muscle; apex of heart; monocyte; left ventricle; right auricle of heart; islet of Langerhans; right lung; right adrenal gland; upper lobe of left lung / Top expressed in: blood; lumbar spinal ganglion; muscle of thigh; molar; right lobe of liver; extraocular muscle; soleus muscle; digastric muscle; atrium; yolk sac; More reference expression data
BioGPS	More reference expression data
Gene ontology
Molecular function	actin binding; protein binding
Cellular component	cytoplasm; cytosol; cell junction; plasma membrane; cell projection; sarcomere; Z discdkac; cytoskeleton; membrane; focal adhesion; lamellipodium; actin cytoskeleton
Biological process	actin cytoskeleton reorganization; cell adhesion; cell projection assembly; lamellipodium assembly; establishment or maintenance of cell polarity regulating cell shape; establishment or maintenance of cell polarity; substrate adhesion-dependent cell spreading
Sources:Amigo / QuickGO
Orthologs
Species	Human	Mouse
Entrez	29780	170736
Ensembl	ENSG00000188677	ENSMUSG00000022438
UniProt	Q9HBI1	Q9ES46
RefSeq (mRNA)	NM_001003828; NM_001243385; NM_001243386; NM_013327	NM_133167
RefSeq (protein)	NP_001003828; NP_001230314; NP_001230315; NP_037459	NP_573395
Location (UCSC)	Chr 22: 44 – 44.17 Mb	Chr 15: 84.12 – 84.2 Mb
PubMed search
- Wikidata
View/Edit Human	View/Edit Mouse

Beta-parvin is a protein that in humans is encoded by the PARVB gene.

Members of the parvin family, including PARVB, PARVA and PARVG, are actin-binding proteins associated with focal contacts.[supplied by OMIM]
