= PARVA =

Protein-coding gene in the species Homo sapiens

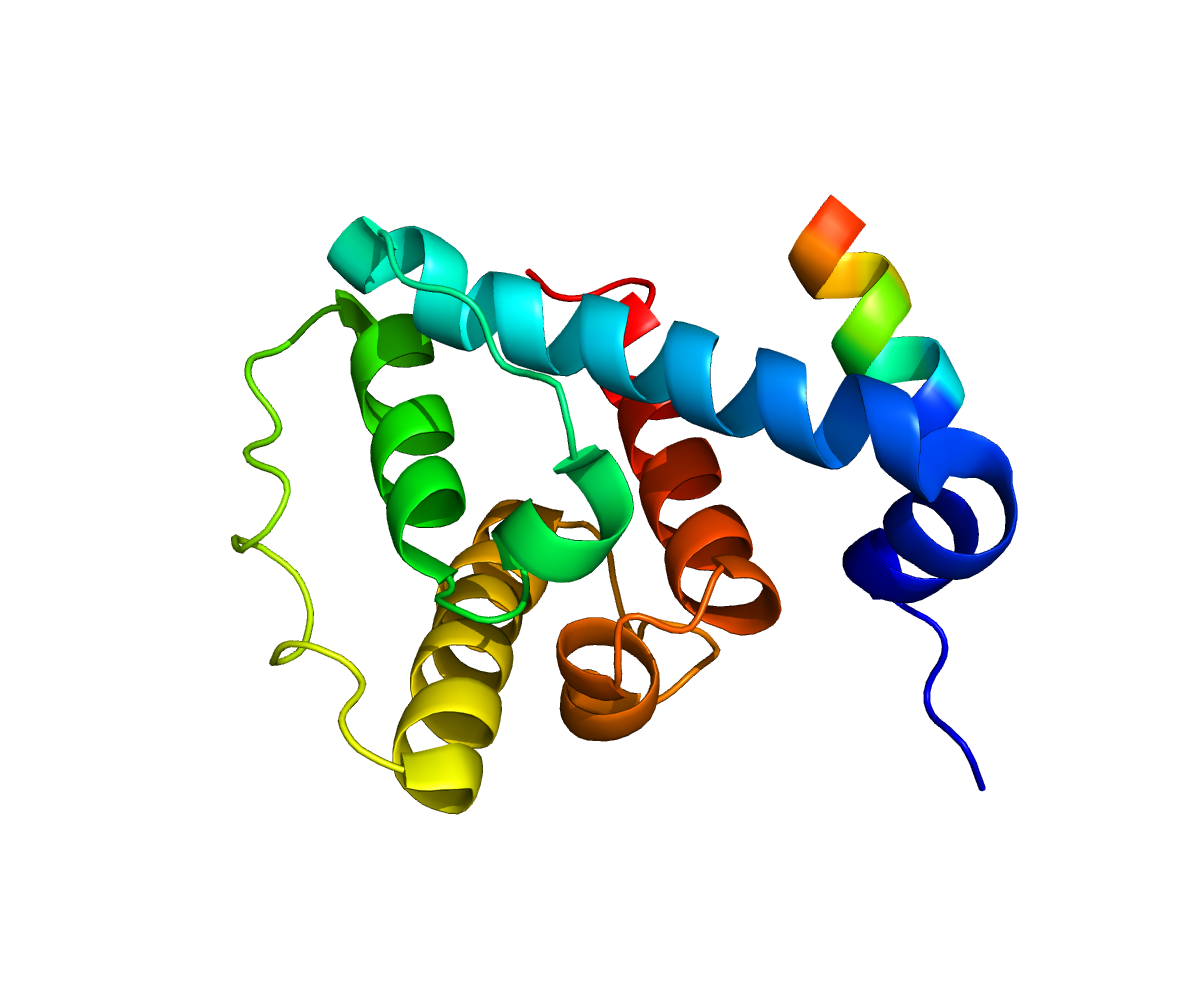
Available structures
PDB	Ortholog search: PDBe RCSB
PDB	List of PDB id codes 2K2R, 2VZC, 2VZD, 2VZG, 2VZI, 3KMU, 3KMW, 3REP

Identifiers
- Aliases: PARVA, CH-ILKBP, MXRA2, parvin alpha
- External IDs: OMIM: 608120; MGI: 1931144; HomoloGene: 10077; GeneCards: PARVA; OMA:PARVA - orthologs

Gene location (Human)
Chr.	Chromosome 11 (human)
Band	11p15.3	Start	12,377,563 bp
Band	11p15.3	End	12,535,356 bp

Gene location (Mouse)
Chr.	Chromosome 7 (mouse)
Band	7|7 F1	Start	112,026,712 bp
Band	7|7 F1	End	112,190,899 bp
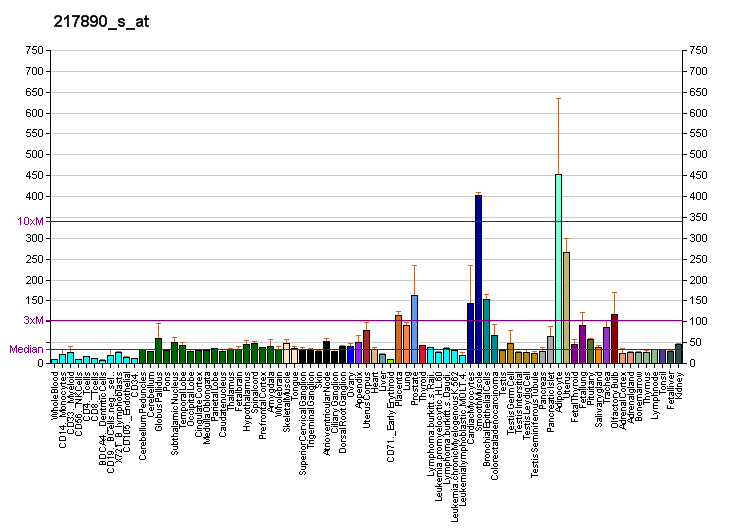
RNA expression pattern
Bgee	Human / Mouse (ortholog); Top expressed in: smooth muscle tissue; stromal cell of endometrium; epithelium of colon; myometrium; muscle layer of sigmoid colon; saphenous vein; gastric mucosa; glomerulus; tail of epididymis; metanephric glomerulus / Top expressed in: superior cervical ganglion; sciatic nerve; umbilical cord; uterus; carotid body; Epithelium of choroid plexus; external carotid artery; olfactory epithelium; right lung lobe; tunica media of zone of aorta; More reference expression data
BioGPS	More reference expression data
Gene ontology
Molecular function	protein binding; actin binding; cadherin binding
Cellular component	cytoplasm; cytosol; membrane; plasma membrane; cell junction; Z discdkac; cytoskeleton; focal adhesion; actin cytoskeleton; nucleus; lamellipodium
Biological process	actin cytoskeleton reorganization; cilium assembly; smooth muscle cell chemotaxis; heterotypic cell-cell adhesion; sprouting angiogenesis; outflow tract septum morphogenesis; establishment or maintenance of cell polarity; chemotaxis; actin-mediated cell contraction; cell adhesion; cell projection organization; angiogenesis; regulation of cell shape; substrate adhesion-dependent cell spreading; cell projection assembly
Sources:Amigo / QuickGO
Orthologs
Species	Human	Mouse
Entrez	55742	57342
Ensembl	ENSG00000197702	ENSMUSG00000030770
UniProt	Q9NVD7	Q9EPC1
RefSeq (mRNA)	NM_018222	NM_020606
RefSeq (protein)	NP_060692	NP_065631
Location (UCSC)	Chr 11: 12.38 – 12.54 Mb	Chr 7: 112.03 – 112.19 Mb
PubMed search
- Wikidata
View/Edit Human	View/Edit Mouse

Alpha-parvin is a protein that in humans is encoded by the PARVA gene.

Members of the parvin family, including PARVA, PARVB and PARVG, are actin-binding proteins associated with focal contacts.[supplied by OMIM]
