= LIMCH1 =

Protein-coding gene in the species Homo sapiens

Identifiers
- Aliases: LIMCH1, LIMCH1A, LMO7B, LIM and calponin homology domains 1
- External IDs: OMIM: 617750; MGI: 1924819; GeneCards: LIMCH1

Gene location (Human)
Chr.	Chromosome 4 (human)
Band	4p13	Start	41,359,607 bp
Band	4p13	End	41,700,044 bp

Gene location (Mouse)
Chr.	Chromosome 5 (mouse)
Band	5|5 C3.1	Start	66,745,827 bp
Band	5|5 C3.1	End	67,057,158 bp
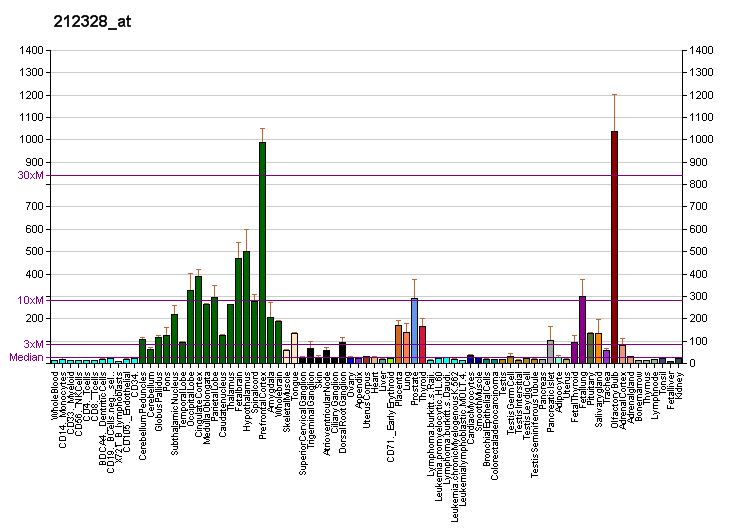

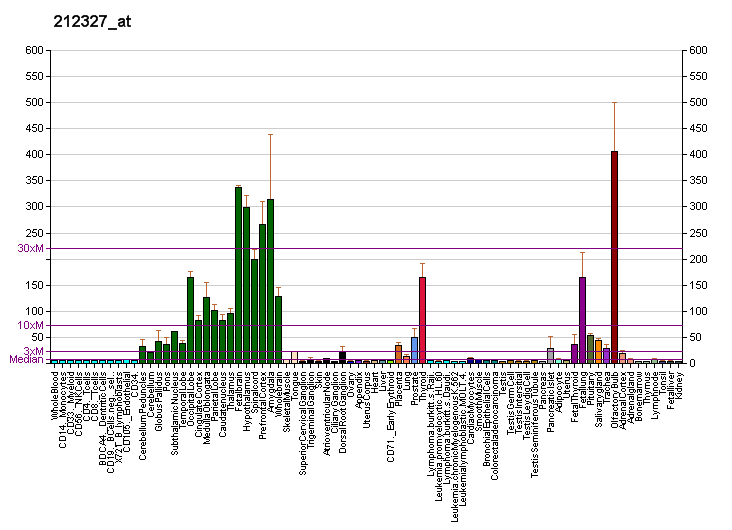

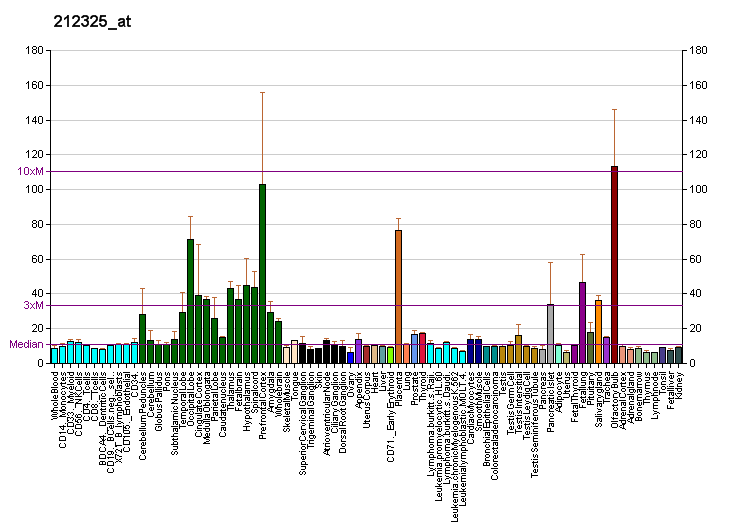
RNA expression pattern
Bgee	Human / Mouse (ortholog); Top expressed in: lower lobe of lung; internal globus pallidus; inferior ganglion of vagus nerve; olfactory bulb; corpus callosum; dorsal motor nucleus of vagus nerve; inferior olivary nucleus; subthalamic nucleus; superior vestibular nucleus; external globus pallidus / Top expressed in: sciatic nerve; left lung; right lung; left lung lobe; right lung lobe; retinal pigment epithelium; epithelium of lens; myocardium of ventricle; right ventricle; ankle; More reference expression data
BioGPS	More reference expression data
Gene ontology
Molecular function	actin binding; metal ion binding; myosin II head/neck binding
Cellular component	stress fiber; myosin II complex; cytoplasm; cytoskeleton
Biological process	actomyosin structure organization; positive regulation of protein phosphorylation; negative regulation of cell migration; positive regulation of stress fiber assembly; regulation of focal adhesion assembly
Sources:Amigo / QuickGO
Orthologs
Databases	NCBI: entry; OMA: entry
Species	Human	Mouse
Entrez	22998	77569
Ensembl	ENSG00000064042	ENSMUSG00000037736
UniProt	Q9UPQ0	Q3UH68
RefSeq (mRNA)	NM_001112717; NM_001112718; NM_001112719; NM_001112720; NM_001289122 NM_001289124; NM_014988; NM_001330672; NM_001330674; NM_001330784; NM_001330786; NM_001330787; NM_001330788; NM_001330789; NM_001330790; NM_001330791; NM_001330792; NM_001330793; NM_001330982; NM_001330983	NM_001001980; NM_001256122; NM_001368863
RefSeq (protein)	NP_001106188; NP_001106189; NP_001106190; NP_001106191; NP_001276051 NP_001276053; NP_001317601; NP_001317603; NP_001317713; NP_001317715; NP_001317716; NP_001317717; NP_001317718; NP_001317719; NP_001317720; NP_001317721; NP_001317722; NP_001317911; NP_001317912; NP_055803	NP_001001980; NP_001243051; NP_001355792; NP_001388339; NP_001388340 NP_001388341; NP_001388342; NP_001388343; NP_001388344; NP_001388345; NP_001388346; NP_001388347; NP_001388348; NP_001388349; NP_001388350; NP_001388351; NP_001388352; NP_001388353; NP_001388354; NP_001388355; NP_001388356; NP_001390437; NP_001390438
Location (UCSC)	Chr 4: 41.36 – 41.7 Mb	Chr 5: 66.75 – 67.06 Mb
PubMed search
- Wikidata
View/Edit Human	View/Edit Mouse

LIM and calponin homology domains-containing protein 1 is a protein that in humans is encoded by the LIMCH1 gene.
