= CYP109 family =

Family of cytochrome P450 enzymes

Cytochrome P450, family 109, also known as CYP109, is a cytochrome P450 monooxygenase family, many members are associated with fatty acid hydroxylation. The first gene identified in this family is the CYP109A1 and CYP109B1 from Bacillus subtilis. CYP109 is one of the only three P450 families shared in bacteria and archaea, the other two are CYP147 and CYP197. Genes in this family are co-present on archaeal plasmids and chromosomes, implying the plasmid-mediated horizontal gene transfer of these genes from bacteria to archaea.
