= PARVG =

Protein-coding gene in the species Homo sapiens

Identifiers
- Aliases: PARVG, parvin gamma
- External IDs: OMIM: 608122; MGI: 2158329; HomoloGene: 11151; GeneCards: PARVG; OMA:PARVG - orthologs

Gene location (Human)
Chr.	Chromosome 22 (human)
Band	22q13.31	Start	44,172,956 bp
Band	22q13.31	End	44,219,533 bp

Gene location (Mouse)
Chr.	Chromosome 15 (mouse)
Band	15|15 E2	Start	84,208,227 bp
Band	15|15 E2	End	84,227,179 bp
RNA expression pattern
Bgee	Human / Mouse (ortholog); Top expressed in: granulocyte; monocyte; spleen; blood; appendix; lymph node; bone marrow; bone marrow cells; upper lobe of left lung; right lung / Top expressed in: granulocyte; thymus; spleen; tibiofemoral joint; mesenteric lymph nodes; bone marrow; dentate gyrus of hippocampal formation granule cell; spermatid; blood; lumbar subsegment of spinal cord; More reference expression data
BioGPS	n/a
Gene ontology
Molecular function	actin binding; protein binding
Cellular component	cytoplasm; cell junction; plasma membrane; cytoskeleton; membrane; focal adhesion; actin cytoskeleton
Biological process	actin cytoskeleton reorganization; cell-matrix adhesion; cell adhesion; establishment or maintenance of cell polarity; cell projection assembly; substrate adhesion-dependent cell spreading
Sources:Amigo / QuickGO
Orthologs
Species	Human	Mouse
Entrez	64098	64099
Ensembl	ENSG00000138964	ENSMUSG00000022439
UniProt	Q9HBI0	Q9ERD8
RefSeq (mRNA)	NM_001137605; NM_001137606; NM_001254741; NM_001254742; NM_001254743 NM_022141	NM_001162500; NM_022321
RefSeq (protein)	NP_001131077; NP_071424	NP_001155972; NP_071716
Location (UCSC)	Chr 22: 44.17 – 44.22 Mb	Chr 15: 84.21 – 84.23 Mb
PubMed search
- Wikidata
View/Edit Human	View/Edit Mouse

Gamma-parvin is a protein that in humans is encoded by the PARVG gene.

Members of the parvin family, including PARVG, PARVA and PARVB, are actin-binding proteins associated with focal contacts.[supplied by OMIM]
