= NAV2 =

Protein-coding gene in the species Homo sapiens

Available structures
PDB	Human UniProt search: PDBe RCSB
PDB	List of PDB id codes 2YRN

Identifiers
- Aliases: NAV2, HELAD1, POMFIL2, RAINB1, STEERIN2, UNC53H2, neuron navigator 2
- External IDs: OMIM: 607026; MGI: 2183691; HomoloGene: 52330; GeneCards: NAV2; OMA:NAV2 - orthologs

Gene location (Human)
Chr.	Chromosome 11 (human)
Band	11p15.1	Start	19,350,724 bp
Band	11p15.1	End	20,121,601 bp

Gene location (Mouse)
Chr.	Chromosome 7 (mouse)
Band	7|7 B4	Start	48,908,716 bp
Band	7|7 B4	End	49,610,090 bp
RNA expression pattern
Bgee	Human / Mouse (ortholog); Top expressed in: cartilage tissue; tail of epididymis; corpus epididymis; visceral pleura; internal globus pallidus; bronchial epithelial cell; caput epididymis; oocyte; epithelium of lactiferous gland; medulla oblongata / Top expressed in: zygote; ascending aorta; granular layer; aortic valve; cardiac muscle tissue of left ventricle; secondary oocyte; choroid plexus of fourth ventricle; extraocular muscle; plantaris muscle; extensor digitorum longus muscle; More reference expression data
BioGPS	n/a
Gene ontology
Molecular function	nucleotide binding; heparin binding; protein binding; ATP binding; hydrolase activity; helicase activity
Cellular component	interstitial matrix; nucleus; nucleoplasm; extracellular matrix
Biological process	vagus nerve development; sensory perception of smell; glossopharyngeal nerve development; regulation of systemic arterial blood pressure by baroreceptor feedback; hearing; locomotory behavior; optic nerve development; nervous system development; neurogenesis
Sources:Amigo / QuickGO
Orthologs
Species	Human	Mouse
Entrez	89797	78286
Ensembl	ENSG00000166833	ENSMUSG00000052512
UniProt	Q8IVL1	n/a
RefSeq (mRNA)	NM_001111018; NM_001111019; NM_001244963; NM_145117; NM_182964	NM_001111016; NM_175272
RefSeq (protein)	NP_001104488; NP_001104489; NP_001231892; NP_660093; NP_892009	n/a
Location (UCSC)	Chr 11: 19.35 – 20.12 Mb	Chr 7: 48.91 – 49.61 Mb
PubMed search
- Wikidata
View/Edit Human	View/Edit Mouse

Neuron navigator 2 is a protein that in humans is encoded by the NAV2 gene. The vitamin A metabolite, all-trans retinoic acid (atRA), plays an important role in neuronal development, including neurite outgrowth. NAV2 is an atRA-responsive gene.

== Gene ==
Different isoforms have been discovered for this gene.

== Function ==
The NAV2 gene, which is extensively expressed in the brain and is important to nervous system development.

The neuron navigator plays a role in cellular growth and migration.

The NAV2 gene was shown to be strongly expressed in the brain, as well as the kidney, liver, thyroid, mammary gland, and spinal cord (and may be involved in cell proliferation, migration, and nervous system development).

== Clinical significance ==
Connections have been drawn to Nav2 having an association with human neurocognitive disorders Alzheimer's disease and age-related phenotypes. It has been discussed that future studies of Nav2 could provide crucial information in understanding the pathophysiology of the disease and its related phenotypes.

It may play a role in Alzheimer's disease. Alzheimer's disease is a chronic neurological illness whose prevalence rises rapidly as people reach the age of 65. According to reports, Alzheimer's disease is one of the top ten main causes of death in the United States. There are 50 introns and 38 exons in the neuron navigator 2 (NAV2) gene.

NAV2 has recently been linked to episodic memory scores in Alzheimer's patients. To date, no study has looked into the link between the NAV2 gene and the risk or AAO of Alzheimer's disease.

NAV2 may be one of the processes linking blood pressure, cardiovascular disease, and neurodegenerative disorders, according to this study. NAV2 was found to be overexpressed in human colorectal cancer in another gene expression analysis, suggesting that it could be used as a predictive biomarker as well as a possible therapeutic target for colorectal cancer. However, the conducted study may have some limitations, so more research is needed to adequately understand the purpose of NAV2.
