= DIXDC1 =

Protein-coding gene in humans

Available structures
PDB	Ortholog search: PDBe RCSB
PDB	List of PDB id codes 3PZ7

Identifiers
- Aliases: DIXDC1, CCD1, DIX domain containing 1
- External IDs: OMIM: 610493; MGI: 2679721; HomoloGene: 82369; GeneCards: DIXDC1; OMA:DIXDC1 - orthologs

Gene location (Human)
Chr.	Chromosome 11 (human)
Band	11q23.1	Start	111,927,144 bp
Band	11q23.1	End	112,022,653 bp

Gene location (Mouse)
Chr.	Chromosome 9 (mouse)
Band	9|9 A5.3	Start	50,574,052 bp
Band	9|9 A5.3	End	50,650,817 bp
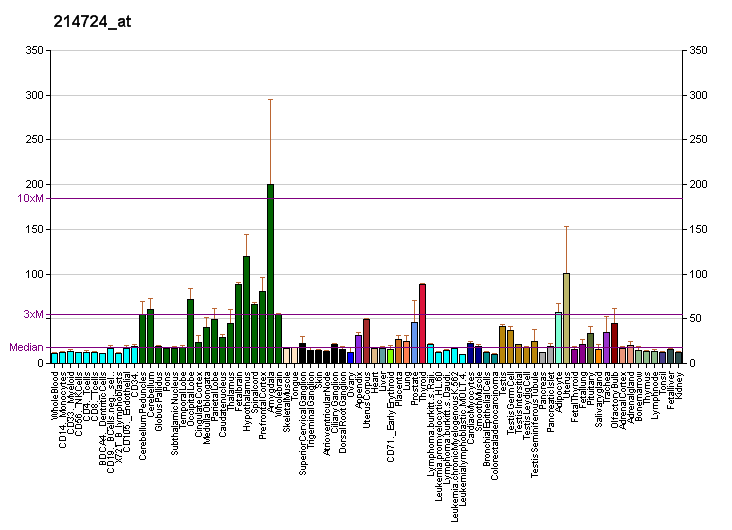
RNA expression pattern
Bgee	Human / Mouse (ortholog); Top expressed in: Achilles tendon; inferior ganglion of vagus nerve; corpus callosum; urethra; saphenous vein; superficial temporal artery; subthalamic nucleus; ventral tegmental area; synovial joint; mucosa of paranasal sinus / Top expressed in: lobe of cerebellum; cerebellar vermis; habenula; superior colliculus; pontine nuclei; epithelium of lens; dorsomedial hypothalamic nucleus; ventral tegmental area; neural layer of retina; medial dorsal nucleus; More reference expression data
BioGPS	More reference expression data
Gene ontology
Molecular function	actin binding; gamma-tubulin binding; protein binding; protein domain specific binding
Cellular component	cytosol; cell junction; focal adhesion; cytoplasm; cytoskeleton
Biological process	positive regulation of canonical Wnt signaling pathway; multicellular organism development; positive regulation of Wnt signaling pathway; regulation of microtubule cytoskeleton organization; forebrain ventricular zone progenitor cell division; cerebral cortex radially oriented cell migration; cerebral cortex cell migration; regulation of actin cytoskeleton organization; negative regulation of neuron differentiation; Wnt signaling pathway; cell proliferation in forebrain; canonical Wnt signaling pathway
Sources:Amigo / QuickGO
Orthologs
Species	Human	Mouse
Entrez	85458	330938
Ensembl	ENSG00000150764	ENSMUSG00000032064
UniProt	Q155Q3	Q80Y83
RefSeq (mRNA)	NM_001037954; NM_001278542; NM_033425	NM_178118; NM_001311069; NM_001374656
RefSeq (protein)	NP_001033043; NP_001265471; NP_219493	NP_001297998; NP_835219; NP_001361585
Location (UCSC)	Chr 11: 111.93 – 112.02 Mb	Chr 9: 50.57 – 50.65 Mb
PubMed search
- Wikidata
View/Edit Human	View/Edit Mouse

Dixin is a protein that in humans is encoded by the DIXDC1 gene. When active it stops cancer metastasis due to extreme stickiness, both in vitro and in vivo.
