= PLS3 =

Protein-coding gene in the species Homo sapiens

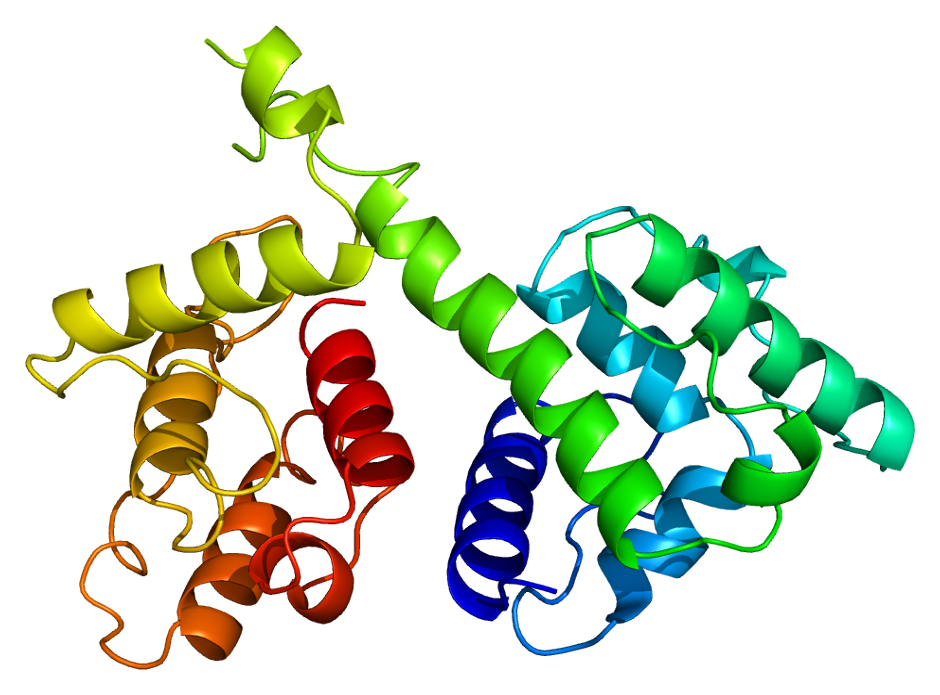

Identifiers
- Aliases: PLS3, BMND18, T-plastin, plastin 3
- External IDs: OMIM: 300131; MGI: 104807; GeneCards: PLS3
Available structures
PDB	Ortholog search: PDBe RCSB
PDB	List of PDB id codes 1AOA, 1WJO

Gene location (Human)
Chr.	X chromosome (human)
Band	Xq23	Start	115,561,174 bp
Band	Xq23	End	115,650,861 bp

Gene location (Mouse)
Chr.	X chromosome (mouse)
Band	X|X A7.3	Start	74,829,260 bp
Band	X|X A7.3	End	74,918,788 bp
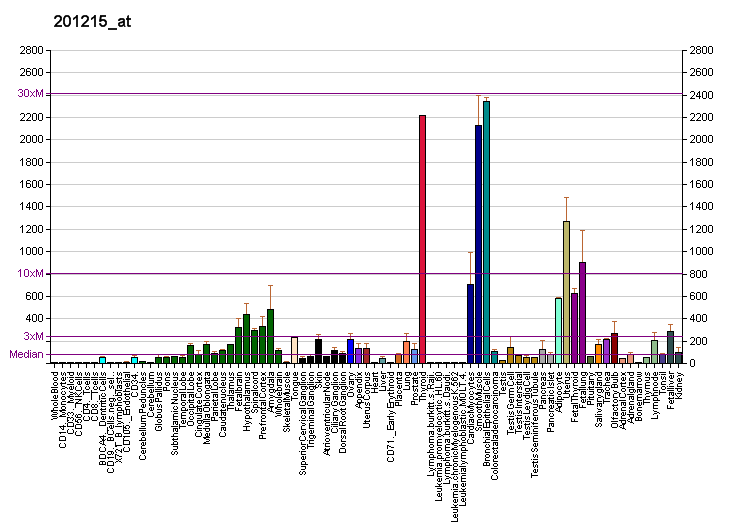
RNA expression pattern
Bgee	Human / Mouse (ortholog); Top expressed in: Achilles tendon; visceral pleura; parietal pleura; skin of hip; amniotic fluid; Descending thoracic aorta; ascending aorta; right coronary artery; oral cavity; skin of thigh / Top expressed in: tunica media of zone of aorta; subiculum; ascending aorta; conjunctival fornix; efferent ductule; pontine nuclei; umbilical cord; carotid body; molar; mammillary body; More reference expression data
BioGPS	More reference expression data
Gene ontology
Molecular function	calcium ion binding; actin binding; metal ion binding; actin filament binding
Cellular component	cytoplasm; cytosol; actin filament; plasma membrane; actin filament bundle
Biological process	bone development; actin filament bundle assembly; actin filament network formation; actin crosslink formation
Sources:Amigo / QuickGO
Orthologs
Databases	NCBI: entry; OMA: entry
Species	Human	Mouse
Entrez	5358	102866
Ensembl	ENSG00000102024	ENSMUSG00000016382
UniProt	P13797	Q99K51
RefSeq (mRNA)	NM_001136025; NM_001172335; NM_001282337; NM_001282338; NM_005032	NM_001166453; NM_001166454; NM_145629; NM_001346519; NM_001346520
RefSeq (protein)	NP_001129497; NP_001165806; NP_001269266; NP_001269267; NP_005023	NP_001159925; NP_001159926; NP_001333448; NP_001333449; NP_663604
Location (UCSC)	Chr X: 115.56 – 115.65 Mb	Chr X: 74.83 – 74.92 Mb
PubMed search
- Wikidata
View/Edit Human	View/Edit Mouse

Plastin-3 is a highly conserved protein that in humans is encoded by the PLS3 gene on the X chromosome.

== Function ==
Plastins are a family of actin-binding proteins that are conserved throughout eukaryote evolution and expressed in most tissues of higher eukaryotes. In humans, two ubiquitous plastin isoforms (L and T) have been identified. Plastin 1 (otherwise known as Fimbrin) is a third distinct plastin isoform which is specifically expressed at high levels in the small intestine. The L isoform is expressed only in hemopoietic cell lineages, while the T isoform has been found in all other normal cells of solid tissues that have replicative potential (fibroblasts, endothelial cells, epithelial cells, melanocytes, etc.). The C-terminal 570 amino acids of the T-plastin and L-plastin proteins are 83% identical. It contains a potential calcium-binding site near the N-terminus.

== Clinical significance ==
Defects in PLS3 are associated with osteoporosis and bone fracture in humans and in knockout zebrafish.
