= LRCH4 =

Protein-coding gene in the species Homo sapiens

Identifiers
- Aliases: LRCH4, LRN, LRRN1, LRRN4, PP14183, leucine-rich repeats and calponin homology (CH) domain containing 4, leucine rich repeats and calponin homology domain containing 4
- External IDs: MGI: 1917193; HomoloGene: 20532; GeneCards: LRCH4; OMA:LRCH4 - orthologs

Gene location (Human)
| Chr. | Chromosome 7 (human) |
| Band | 7q22.1 | Start | 100,574,011 bp |
| Band | 7q22.1 | End | 100,586,129 bp |

Gene location (Mouse)
| Chr. | Chromosome 5 (mouse) |
| Band | 5|5 G2 | Start | 137,627,383 bp |
| Band | 5|5 G2 | End | 137,639,361 bp |
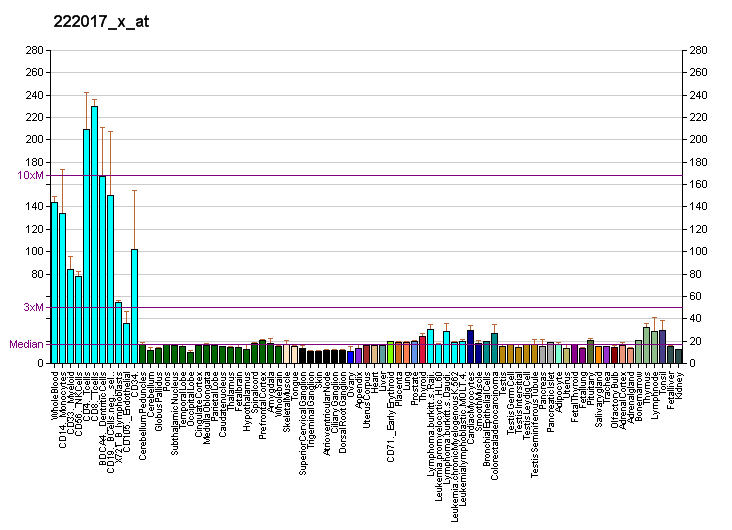

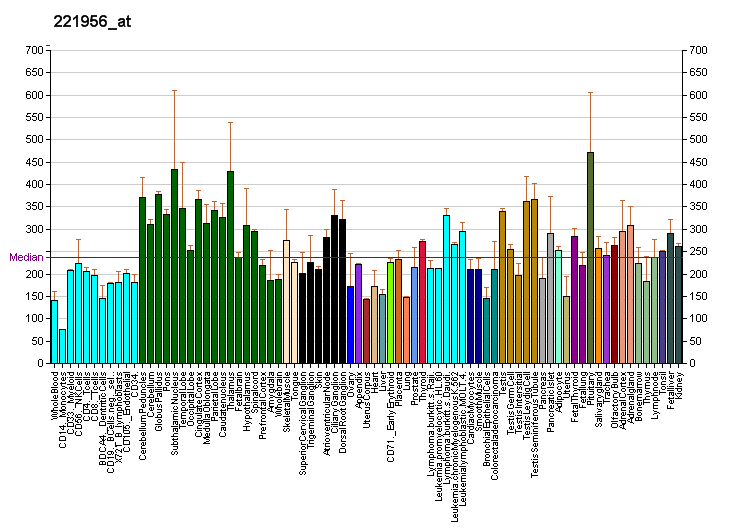

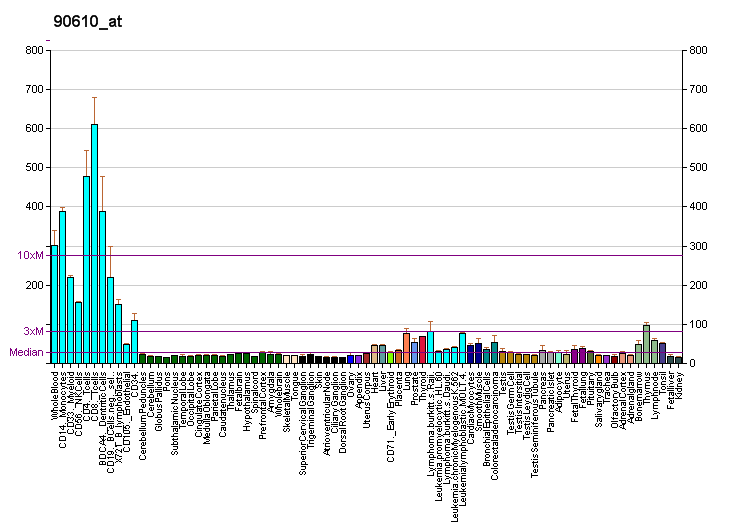
RNA expression pattern
| Bgee | Human / Mouse (ortholog); Top expressed in: granulocyte; right testis; left testis; blood; spleen; pituitary gland; monocyte; right ovary; left ovary; anterior pituitary / Top expressed in: granulocyte; secondary oocyte; zygote; primary oocyte; thymus; spleen; testicle; bone marrow; genital tubercle; tail of embryo; More reference expression data |
| BioGPS | More reference expression data |
Gene ontology
| Molecular function | protein binding |
| Cellular component | PML body; cytoplasm; basolateral plasma membrane |
| Biological process | nervous system development; signal transduction; maintenance of epithelial cell apical/basal polarity |
Sources:Amigo / QuickGO
Orthologs
| Species | Human | Mouse |
| Entrez | 4034 | 231798 |
| Ensembl | ENSG00000077454 | ENSMUSG00000093445 |
| UniProt | O75427 | Q921G6 |
| RefSeq (mRNA) | NM_002319; NM_001289934 | NM_001168652; NM_146164 |
| RefSeq (protein) | NP_001276863; NP_002310 | NP_001162123; NP_666276 |
| Location (UCSC) | Chr 7: 100.57 – 100.59 Mb | Chr 5: 137.63 – 137.64 Mb |
| PubMed search |
- Wikidata
| View/Edit Human | View/Edit Mouse |

Leucine-rich repeat and calponin homology domain-containing protein 4 is a protein that in humans is encoded by the LRCH4 gene.

This gene encodes a protein that contains leucine-rich repeats (LRR) at its amino terminus and that is known to be involved in ligand binding. The carboxyl terminus may act as a membrane anchor. Identified structural elements suggest that the encoded protein resembles a receptor.
