= GAS2L1 =

Protein-coding gene in the species Homo sapiens

Identifiers
- Aliases: GAS2L1, GAR22, growth arrest specific 2 like 1
- External IDs: OMIM: 602128; MGI: 1926176; HomoloGene: 4733; GeneCards: GAS2L1; OMA:GAS2L1 - orthologs

Gene location (Human)
Chr.	Chromosome 22 (human)
Band	22q12.2	Start	29,306,582 bp
Band	22q12.2	End	29,312,785 bp

Gene location (Mouse)
Chr.	Chromosome 11 (mouse)
Band	11|11 A1	Start	5,004,132 bp
Band	11|11 A1	End	5,015,327 bp
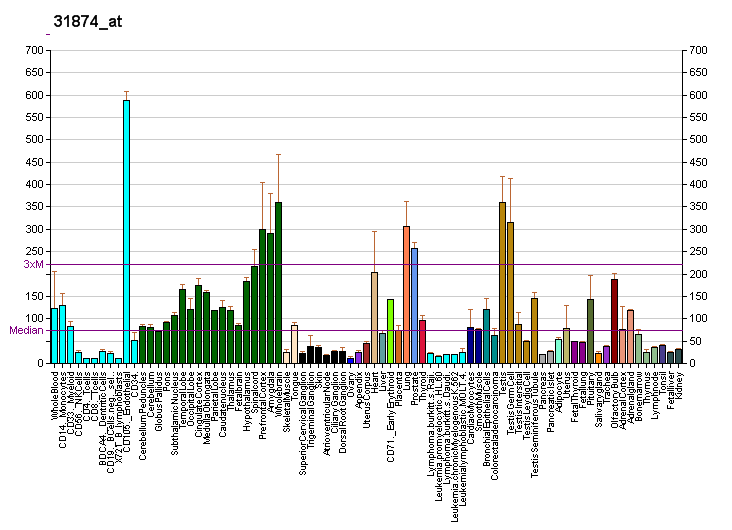

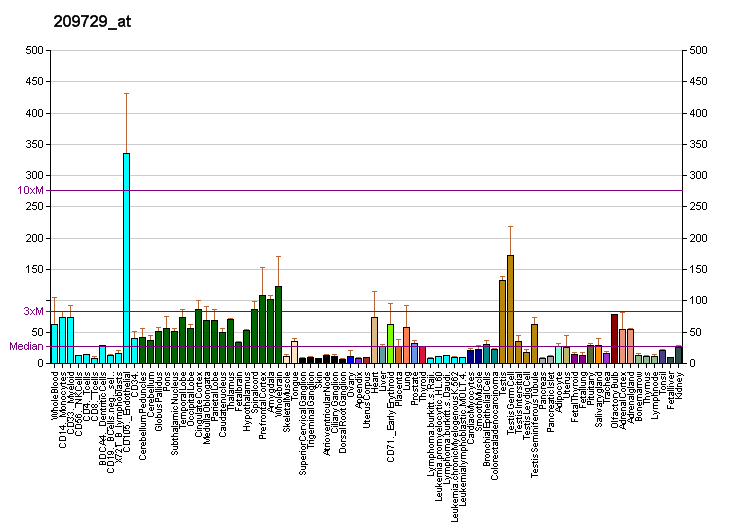

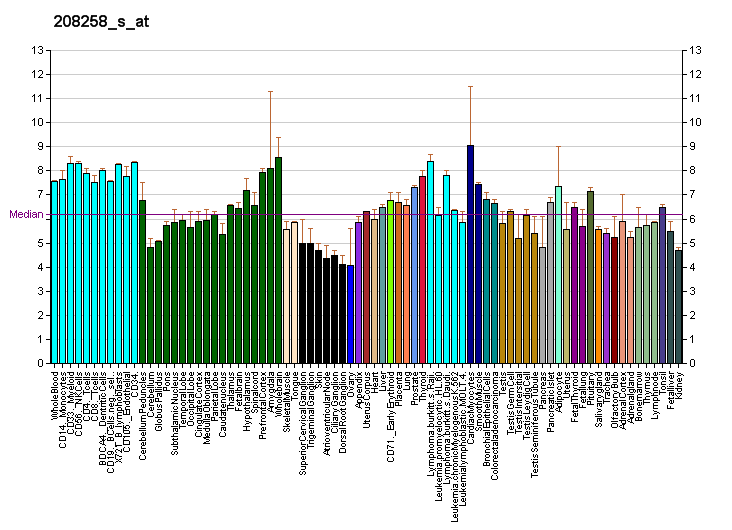
RNA expression pattern
Bgee	Human / Mouse (ortholog); Top expressed in: gingival epithelium; tendon of biceps brachii; seminal vesicula; endothelial cell; Region I of hippocampus proper; dorsal motor nucleus of vagus nerve; olfactory bulb; Brodmann area 23; primary visual cortex; parotid gland / Top expressed in: otic vesicle; blood; lip; seminiferous tubule; internal carotid artery; olfactory epithelium; skin of external ear; external carotid artery; endothelial cell of lymphatic vessel; stroma of bone marrow; More reference expression data
BioGPS	More reference expression data
Gene ontology
Molecular function	cytoskeletal anchor activity; thyroid hormone receptor binding; microtubule binding
Cellular component	cytoplasm; microtubule; cytoskeleton; stress fiber
Biological process	cellular response to starvation; negative regulation of microtubule depolymerization; negative regulation of cell growth; microtubule bundle formation; negative regulation of gene expression; negative regulation of erythrocyte differentiation; cellular response to thyroid hormone stimulus; regulation of cell cycle
Sources:Amigo / QuickGO
Orthologs
Species	Human	Mouse
Entrez	10634	78926
Ensembl	ENSG00000185340	ENSMUSG00000034201
UniProt	Q99501	Q8JZP9
RefSeq (mRNA)	NM_001278730; NM_006478; NM_152236; NM_152237; NM_001362985 NM_001395196; NM_001395197	NM_001190406; NM_001190408; NM_030228; NM_144560
RefSeq (protein)	NP_001265659; NP_006469; NP_689422; NP_689423; NP_001349914	NP_001177335; NP_001177337; NP_084504; NP_653146
Location (UCSC)	Chr 22: 29.31 – 29.31 Mb	Chr 11: 5 – 5.02 Mb
PubMed search
- Wikidata
View/Edit Human	View/Edit Mouse

GAS2-like protein 1 is a protein that in humans is encoded by the GAS2L1 gene.

The protein encoded by this gene, a member of the GAS2 family, is similar in sequence to the mouse protein Gas2, an actin-associated protein expressed at high levels in growth-arrested cells. Expression of the mouse Gas2 gene is negatively regulated by serum and growth factors. Three transcript variants encoding two different isoforms have been found for this gene.
