= GAS2 =

Protein-coding gene in the species Homo sapiens

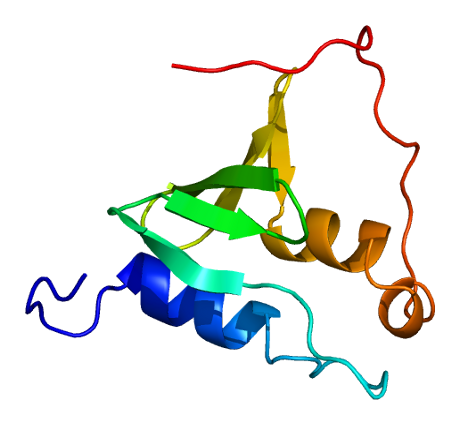
Available structures
| PDB | Ortholog search: PDBe RCSB |
| PDB | List of PDB id codes 1V5R |

Identifiers
- Aliases: GAS2, growth arrest specific 2, GAS-2
- External IDs: OMIM: 602835; MGI: 95657; HomoloGene: 31301; GeneCards: GAS2; OMA:GAS2 - orthologs

Gene location (Human)
| Chr. | Chromosome 11 (human) |
| Band | 11p14.3 | Start | 22,625,509 bp |
| Band | 11p14.3 | End | 22,813,001 bp |

Gene location (Mouse)
| Chr. | Chromosome 7 (mouse) |
| Band | 7 B4|7 32.87 cM | Start | 51,511,763 bp |
| Band | 7 B4|7 32.87 cM | End | 51,644,723 bp |
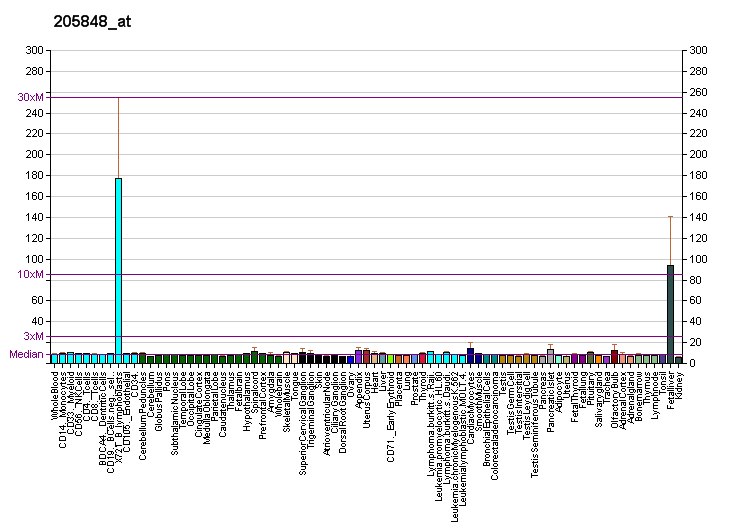
RNA expression pattern
| Bgee | Human / Mouse (ortholog); Top expressed in: trigeminal ganglion; liver; sural nerve; right lobe of liver; islet of Langerhans; C1 segment; Skeletal muscle tissue of rectus abdominis; Achilles tendon; gonad; spinal ganglia / Top expressed in: vestibular sensory epithelium; stria vascularis; vestibular membrane of cochlear duct; right kidney; proximal tubule; utricle; human kidney; hand; cochlea; saccule; More reference expression data |
| BioGPS | More reference expression data |
Gene ontology
| Molecular function | microtubule binding; actin binding |
| Cellular component | cytoskeleton; cytosol; actin filament; membrane; cytoplasm |
| Biological process | cell cycle; regulation of cell shape; apoptotic process; initiation of primordial ovarian follicle growth; antral ovarian follicle growth; regulation of Notch signaling pathway; ovulation; basement membrane organization; microtubule cytoskeleton organization; actin cytoskeleton organization |
Sources:Amigo / QuickGO
Orthologs
| Species | Human | Mouse |
| Entrez | 2620 | 14453 |
| Ensembl | ENSG00000148935 | ENSMUSG00000030498 |
| UniProt | O43903 | P11862 |
| RefSeq (mRNA) | NM_001143830; NM_005256; NM_177553; NM_001351224; NM_001391933 NM_001391934; NM_001391935; NM_001391936; NM_001391937 | NM_008087; NM_001330607; NM_001330608 |
| RefSeq (protein) | NP_001137302; NP_005247; NP_808221; NP_001338153 | NP_001317536; NP_001317537; NP_032113 |
| Location (UCSC) | Chr 11: 22.63 – 22.81 Mb | Chr 7: 51.51 – 51.64 Mb |
| PubMed search |
- Wikidata
| View/Edit Human | View/Edit Mouse |

Growth arrest-specific protein 2 is a protein that in humans is encoded by the GAS2 gene.

The protein encoded by this gene is a caspase-3 substrate that plays a role in regulating microfilament and cell shape changes during apoptosis. It can also modulate cell susceptibility to p53-dependent apoptosis by inhibiting calpain activity. Two alternatively spliced transcript variants encoding the same protein have been described for this gene.
