= MICALL1 =

Protein-coding gene in the species Homo sapiens

Identifiers
- Aliases: MICALL1, MICAL-L1, MIRAB13, MICAL like 1
- External IDs: MGI: 105870; GeneCards: MICALL1
Available structures
PDB	Ortholog search: PDBe RCSB
PDB	List of PDB id codes 2KSP

Gene location (Human)
Chr.	Chromosome 22 (human)
Band	22q13.1	Start	37,905,657 bp
Band	22q13.1	End	37,942,822 bp

Gene location (Mouse)
Chr.	Chromosome 15 (mouse)
Band	15 E1|15 37.7 cM	Start	79,108,898 bp
Band	15 E1|15 37.7 cM	End	79,136,900 bp
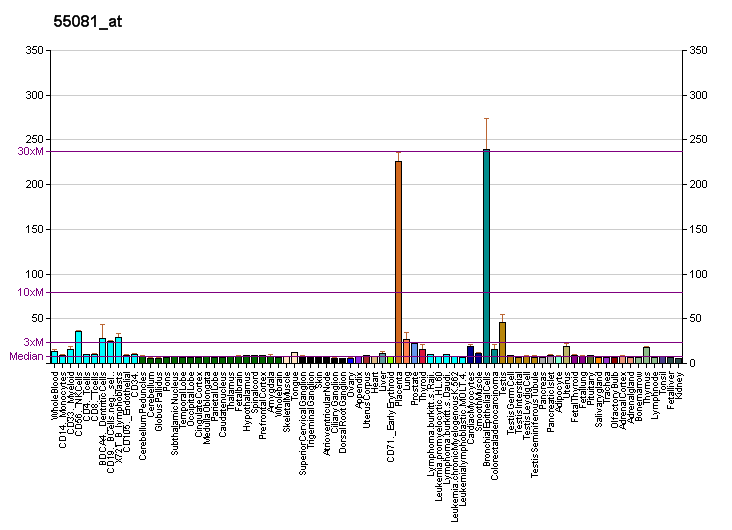

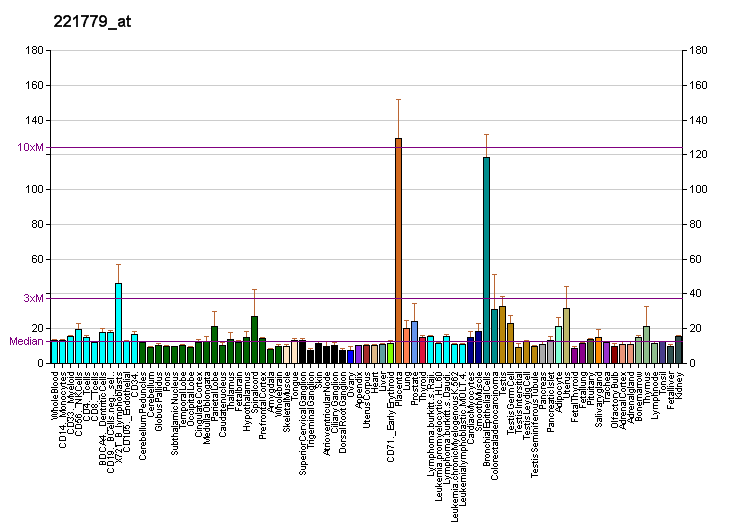
RNA expression pattern
Bgee	Human / Mouse (ortholog); Top expressed in: gingival epithelium; sperm; body of stomach; mucosa of esophagus; hair follicle; placenta; sural nerve; human penis; muscle layer of sigmoid colon; skin of leg / Top expressed in: ascending aorta; aortic valve; molar; gastrula; vestibular membrane of cochlear duct; atrium; otolith organ; utricle; suprachiasmatic nucleus; lip; More reference expression data
BioGPS	More reference expression data
Gene ontology
Molecular function	metal ion binding; phosphatidic acid binding; protein binding; identical protein binding; cadherin binding
Cellular component	endosome; late endosome; membrane; late endosome membrane; recycling endosome membrane; trans-Golgi network; early endosome; endosome membrane; extrinsic component of membrane; intracellular anatomical structure
Biological process	cellular response to nerve growth factor stimulus; endocytosis; protein targeting to membrane; receptor-mediated endocytosis; plasma membrane tubulation; endocytic recycling; protein transport; protein localization to endosome; neuron projection development; slow endocytic recycling
Sources:Amigo / QuickGO
Orthologs
Databases	NCBI: entry; OMA: entry
Species	Human	Mouse
Entrez	85377	27008
Ensembl	ENSG00000100139	ENSMUSG00000033039
UniProt	Q8N3F8	Q8BGT6
RefSeq (mRNA)	NM_033386	NM_177461
RefSeq (protein)	NP_203744	NP_803412
Location (UCSC)	Chr 22: 37.91 – 37.94 Mb	Chr 15: 79.11 – 79.14 Mb
PubMed search
- Wikidata
View/Edit Human	View/Edit Mouse

MICAL-like 1, also known as MICALL1, is a human gene.
