= MAPRE3 =

Protein-coding gene in the species Homo sapiens

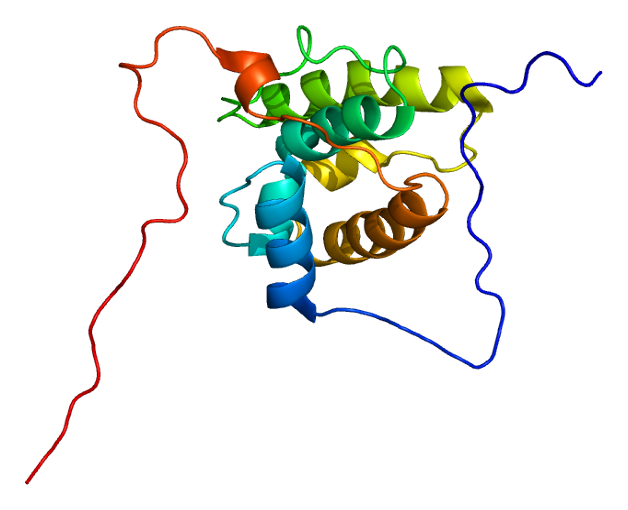

Identifiers
- Aliases: MAPRE3, EB3, EBF3, EBF3-S, RP3, microtubule associated protein RP/EB family member 3
- External IDs: OMIM: 605788; MGI: 2140967; GeneCards: MAPRE3
Available structures
| PDB | Ortholog search: PDBe RCSB |
| PDB | List of PDB id codes 1WYO, 3CO1, 3JAK, 3JAL, 3JAR, 3TQ7 |

Gene location (Human)
| Chr. | Chromosome 2 (human) |
| Band | 2p23.3 | Start | 26,970,637 bp |
| Band | 2p23.3 | End | 27,027,219 bp |

Gene location (Mouse)
| Chr. | Chromosome 5 (mouse) |
| Band | 5|5 B1 | Start | 30,971,985 bp |
| Band | 5|5 B1 | End | 31,023,450 bp |
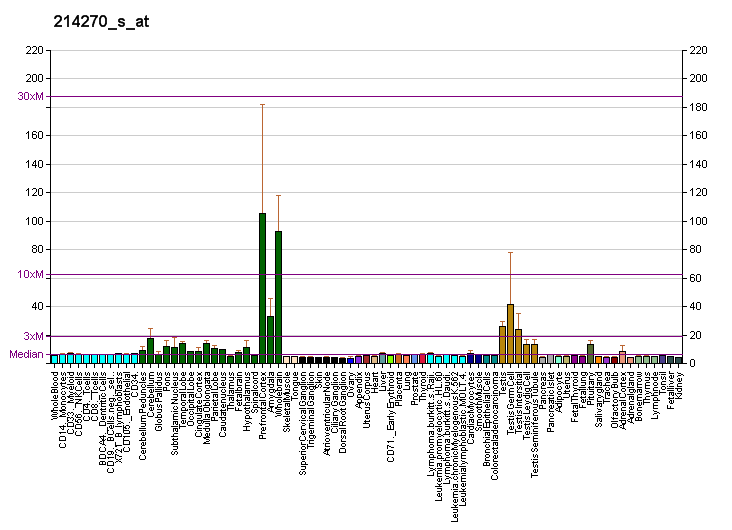

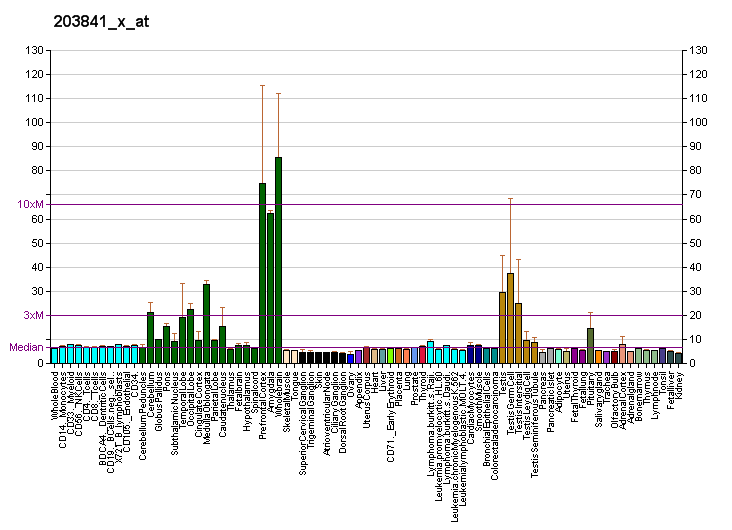

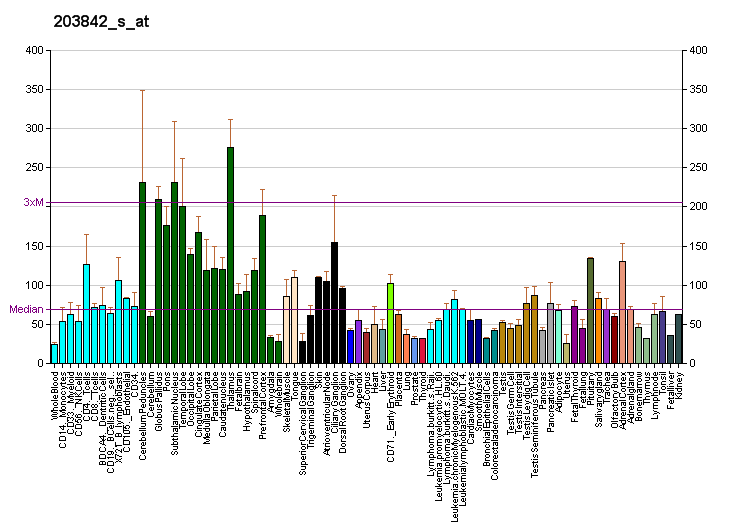
RNA expression pattern
| Bgee | Human / Mouse (ortholog); Top expressed in: Brodmann area 10; right hemisphere of cerebellum; right frontal lobe; right uterine tube; middle frontal gyrus; paraflocculus of cerebellum; frontal pole; cingulate gyrus; anterior cingulate cortex; anterior pituitary / Top expressed in: neural layer of retina; superior frontal gyrus; primary visual cortex; dentate gyrus of hippocampal formation granule cell; muscle of thigh; perirhinal cortex; cerebellar cortex; CA3 field; spermatid; entorhinal cortex; More reference expression data |
| BioGPS | More reference expression data |
Gene ontology
| Molecular function | microtubule binding; protein binding; identical protein binding; protein C-terminus binding; protein kinase binding; microtubule plus-end binding |
| Cellular component | microtubule cytoskeleton; microtubule plus-end; perinuclear region of cytoplasm; cytoplasmic microtubule; midbody; microtubule; cytoskeleton; cytoplasm; microtubule organizing center; spindle midzone; mitotic spindle astral microtubule end |
| Biological process | positive regulation of transcription, DNA-templated; cell cycle; positive regulation of microtubule plus-end binding; positive regulation of cyclin-dependent protein serine/threonine kinase activity; cell division; protein localization; regulation of microtubule polymerization or depolymerization; protein localization to microtubule; positive regulation of protein kinase activity; spindle assembly; protein localization to microtubule plus-end |
Sources:Amigo / QuickGO
Orthologs
| Databases | NCBI: entry; OMA: entry |
| Species | Human | Mouse |
| Entrez | 22924 | 100732 |
| Ensembl | ENSG00000084764 | ENSMUSG00000029166 |
| UniProt | Q9UPY8 | Q6PER3 |
| RefSeq (mRNA) | NM_001303050; NM_012326 | NM_133350; NM_001310516 |
| RefSeq (protein) | NP_001289979; NP_036458 | NP_001297445; NP_579928 |
| Location (UCSC) | Chr 2: 26.97 – 27.03 Mb | Chr 5: 30.97 – 31.02 Mb |
| PubMed search |
- Wikidata
| View/Edit Human | View/Edit Mouse |

Microtubule-associated protein RP/EB family member 3 is a protein that in humans is encoded by the MAPRE3 gene.

The protein encoded by this gene is a member of the RP/EB family of genes. The protein localizes to the cytoplasmic microtubule network and binds APCL, a homolog of the adenomatous polyposis coli tumor suppressor gene.
