= MICAL2 =

Protein-coding gene in the species Homo sapiens

Identifiers
- Aliases: MICAL2, MICAL-2, MICAL2PV1, MICAL2PV2, microtubule associated monooxygenase, calponin and LIM domain containing 2
- External IDs: OMIM: 608881; MGI: 2444947; GeneCards: MICAL2
Available structures
PDB	Ortholog search: PDBe RCSB
PDB	List of PDB id codes 2E9K
Enzyme activity
EC #	BRENDA	ExPASy	KEGG	MetaCyc
1.14.13.225	↗	↗	↗	↗

Gene location (Human)
Chr.	Chromosome 11 (human)
Band	11p15.3	Start	12,094,008 bp
Band	11p15.3	End	12,359,144 bp

Gene location (Mouse)
Chr.	Chromosome 7 (mouse)
Band	7|7 F1	Start	112,225,856 bp
Band	7|7 F1	End	112,413,106 bp
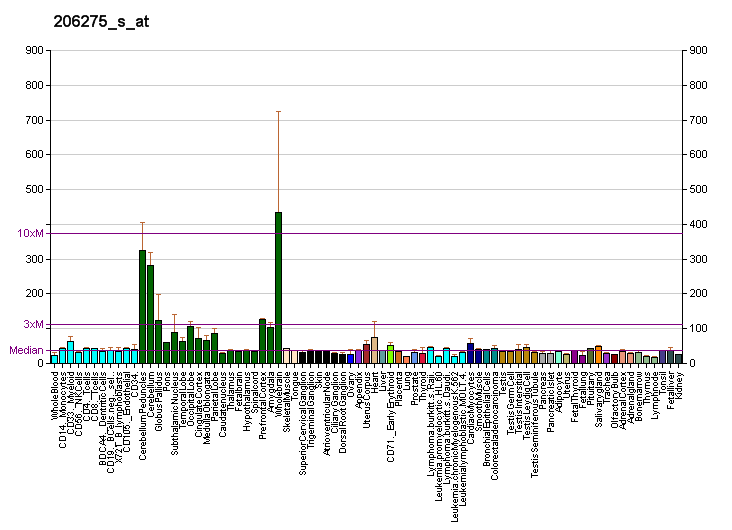

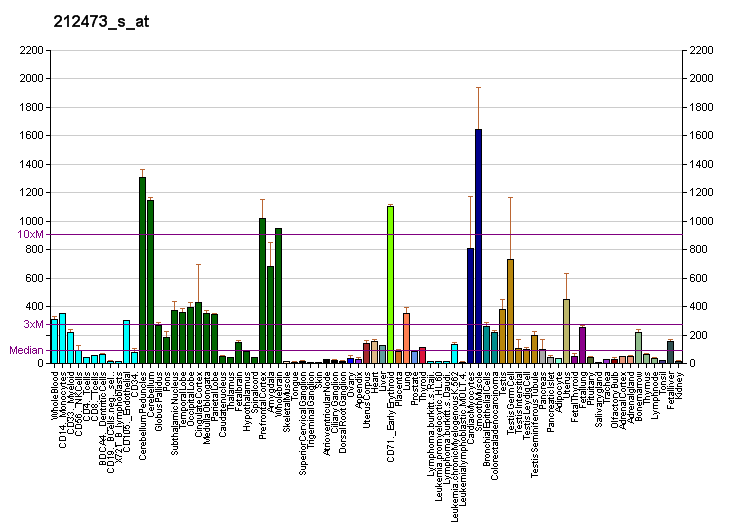
RNA expression pattern
Bgee	Human / Mouse (ortholog); Top expressed in: cerebellar hemisphere; right hemisphere of cerebellum; endothelial cell; primary visual cortex; paraflocculus of cerebellum; Brodmann area 23; Descending thoracic aorta; middle temporal gyrus; right coronary artery; saphenous vein / Top expressed in: dentate gyrus of hippocampal formation granule cell; superior frontal gyrus; muscle of thigh; ascending aorta; seminiferous tubule; aortic valve; primary visual cortex; spermatid; cerebellar cortex; atrium; More reference expression data
BioGPS	More reference expression data
Gene ontology
Molecular function	actin binding; oxidoreductase activity, acting on paired donors, with incorporation or reduction of molecular oxygen, NAD(P)H as one donor, and incorporation of one atom of oxygen; FAD binding; metal ion binding; monooxygenase activity; oxidoreductase activity; NADPH:sulfur oxidoreductase activity; NAD(P)H oxidase H2O2-forming activity
Cellular component	nucleus
Biological process	heart looping; actin filament depolymerization; development of the heart; cytoskeleton organization; sulfur oxidation
Sources:Amigo / QuickGO
Orthologs
Databases	NCBI: entry; OMA: entry
Species	Human	Mouse
Entrez	9645	320878
Ensembl	ENSG00000133816	ENSMUSG00000038244
UniProt	O94851	Q8BML1
RefSeq (mRNA)	NM_001282663; NM_001282664; NM_001282665; NM_001282666; NM_001282667 NM_001282668; NM_001346292; NM_001346293; NM_001346294; NM_001346295; NM_001346296; NM_001346297; NM_001346298; NM_001346299; NM_014632	NM_001193305; NM_177282
RefSeq (protein)	NP_001269592; NP_001269593; NP_001269594; NP_001269595; NP_001269596 NP_001269597; NP_001333221; NP_001333222; NP_001333223; NP_001333224; NP_001333225; NP_001333226; NP_001333227; NP_001333228; NP_055447	NP_001180234; NP_796256
Location (UCSC)	Chr 11: 12.09 – 12.36 Mb	Chr 7: 112.23 – 112.41 Mb
PubMed search
- Wikidata
View/Edit Human	View/Edit Mouse

Protein MICAL-2 is a protein that in humans is encoded by the MICAL2 gene.
