= MICAL1 =

Protein-coding gene in the species Homo sapiens

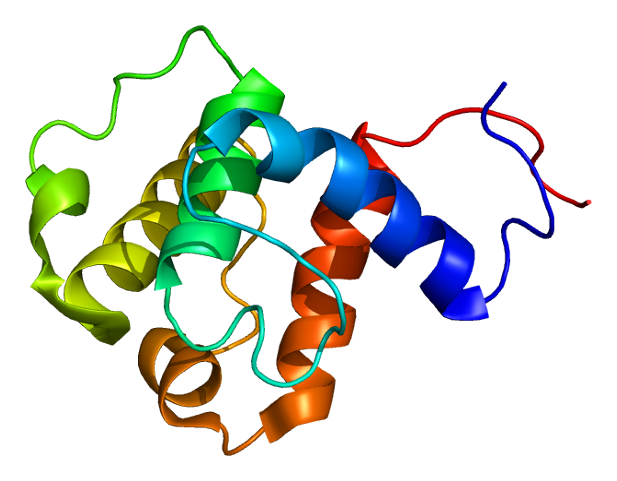

Identifiers
- Aliases: MICAL1, MICAL, MICAL-1, NICAL, microtubule associated monooxygenase, calponin and LIM domain containing 1
- External IDs: OMIM: 607129; MGI: 2385847; GeneCards: MICAL1
Available structures
PDB	Ortholog search: PDBe RCSB
PDB	List of PDB id codes 1WYL, 2CO8
Enzyme activity
EC #	BRENDA	ExPASy	KEGG	MetaCyc
1.6.3.1	↗	↗	↗	↗
1.14.13.225	↗	↗	↗	↗

Gene location (Mouse)
Chr.	Chromosome 10 (mouse)
Band	10|10 B1	Start	41,352,310 bp
Band	10|10 B1	End	41,363,028 bp
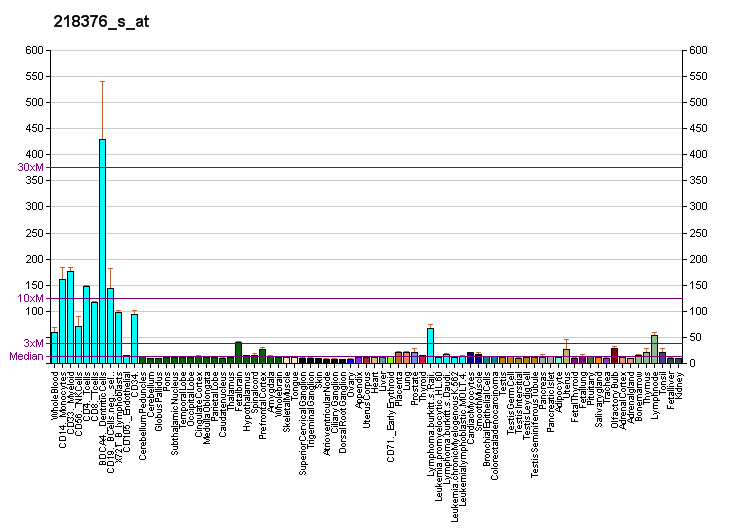
RNA expression pattern
Bgee	Human / Mouse (ortholog); Top expressed in: right coronary artery; left coronary artery; canal of the cervix; spleen; left uterine tube; popliteal artery; ganglionic eminence; stromal cell of endometrium; right lung; ascending aorta / Top expressed in: granulocyte; lumbar spinal ganglion; ascending aorta; external carotid artery; intestinal villus; internal carotid artery; tunica media of zone of aorta; fossa; Paneth cell; sciatic nerve; More reference expression data
BioGPS	More reference expression data
Gene ontology
Molecular function	SH3 domain binding; oxidoreductase activity; actin binding; oxidoreductase activity, acting on paired donors, with incorporation or reduction of molecular oxygen, NAD(P)H as one donor, and incorporation of one atom of oxygen; FAD binding; protein binding; metal ion binding; protein kinase binding; monooxygenase activity; NAD(P)H oxidase H2O2-forming activity; actin filament binding
Cellular component	cytoplasm; cytoskeleton; intermediate filament; hippocampal mossy fiber expansion; cytosol; midbody; intercellular bridge; plasma membrane; actin cytoskeleton
Biological process	negative regulation of protein phosphorylation; actin filament depolymerization; sulfur oxidation; negative regulation of cysteine-type endopeptidase activity involved in apoptotic process; negative regulation of apoptotic process; cytoskeleton organization; signal transduction; regulation of regulated secretory pathway; blood coagulation
Sources:Amigo / QuickGO
Orthologs
Databases	NCBI: entry
Species	Human	Mouse
Entrez	64780	171580
Ensembl	n/a	ENSMUSG00000019823
UniProt	Q8TDZ2	Q8VDP3
RefSeq (mRNA)	NM_022765; NM_001159291; NM_001286613	NM_001164433; NM_138315; NM_001358838; NM_001358839
RefSeq (protein)	NP_001152763; NP_001273542; NP_073602	NP_001157905; NP_612188; NP_001345767; NP_001345768
Location (UCSC)	n/a	Chr 10: 41.35 – 41.36 Mb
PubMed search
- Wikidata
View/Edit Human	View/Edit Mouse

NEDD9-interacting protein with calponin homology and LIM domains is a protein that in humans is encoded by the MICAL1 gene.

== Interactions ==
MICAL1 has been shown to interact with NEDD9 and RAB1A.
