= MICAL3 =

Protein-coding gene in the species Homo sapiens

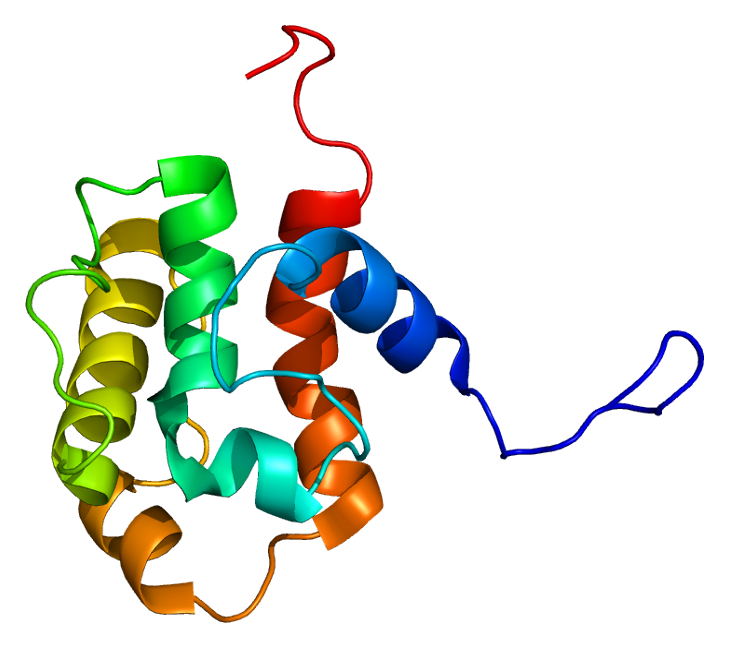

Identifiers
- Aliases: MICAL3, MICAL-3, microtubule associated monooxygenase, calponin and LIM domain containing 3
- External IDs: OMIM: 608882; MGI: 2442733; GeneCards: MICAL3
Available structures
PDB	Ortholog search: PDBe RCSB
PDB	List of PDB id codes 2D88
Enzyme activity
EC #	BRENDA	ExPASy	KEGG	MetaCyc
1.14.13.225	↗	↗	↗	↗

Gene location (Human)
Chr.	Chromosome 22 (human)
Band	22q11.21	Start	17,787,649 bp
Band	22q11.21	End	18,024,561 bp

Gene location (Mouse)
Chr.	Chromosome 6 (mouse)
Band	6|6 F1	Start	120,931,707 bp
Band	6|6 F1	End	121,130,999 bp
RNA expression pattern
Bgee	Human / Mouse (ortholog); Top expressed in: sural nerve; right uterine tube; right hemisphere of cerebellum; apex of heart; body of uterus; smooth muscle tissue; epithelium of colon; muscle layer of sigmoid colon; left testis; left uterine tube / Top expressed in: cumulus cell; lip; zygote; superior frontal gyrus; primary visual cortex; muscle of thigh; dentate gyrus of hippocampal formation granule cell; cerebellar cortex; tail of embryo; genital tubercle; More reference expression data
BioGPS	n/a
Gene ontology
Molecular function	monooxygenase activity; oxidoreductase activity; actin binding; FAD binding; metal ion binding; protein binding; oxidoreductase activity, acting on paired donors, with incorporation or reduction of molecular oxygen, NAD(P)H as one donor, and incorporation of one atom of oxygen
Cellular component	plasma membrane; cytoskeleton; nucleus; nucleoplasm; cytoplasm; cytosol; spindle; cell cortex; midbody; cell projection
Biological process	actin filament depolymerization; cytoskeleton organization; exocytosis; cell cycle; cell division
Sources:Amigo / QuickGO
Orthologs
Databases	NCBI: entry; OMA: entry
Species	Human	Mouse
Entrez	57553	194401
Ensembl	ENSG00000243156	ENSMUSG00000051586
UniProt	Q7RTP6	Q8CJ19
RefSeq (mRNA)	NM_001122731; NM_001136004; NM_015241; NM_020793	NM_001270475; NM_153396
RefSeq (protein)	NP_001116203; NP_001129476; NP_056056	NP_001257404; NP_700445
Location (UCSC)	Chr 22: 17.79 – 18.02 Mb	Chr 6: 120.93 – 121.13 Mb
PubMed search
- Wikidata
View/Edit Human	View/Edit Mouse

Microtubule-associated monoxygenase, calponin and LIM domain containing 3, also known as MICAL3, is a human gene.

== Function ==
Along with two other Rab proteins, Rab6 and Rab8, MICAL3 work together in the process of docking and fusing of vesicles that are involved in exocytosis.
