= Fimbrin =

Protein-coding gene in the species Homo sapiens

PLS1
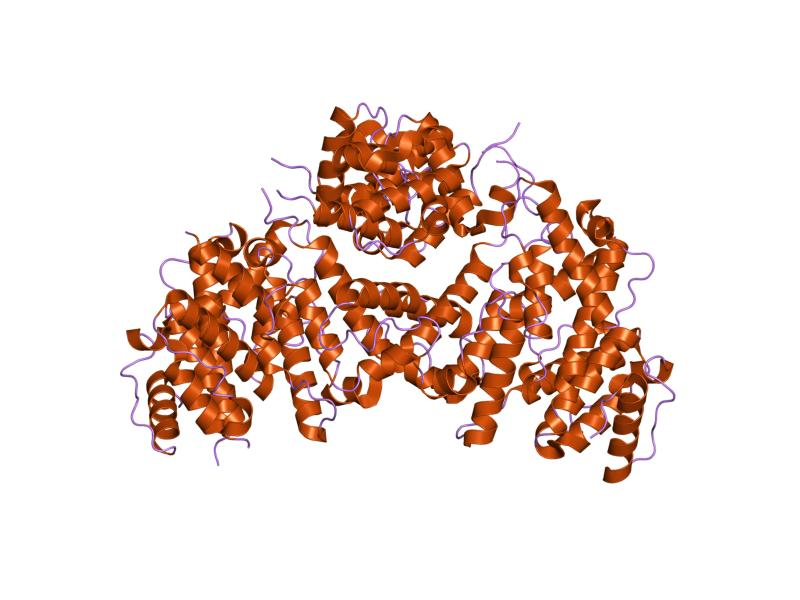

Identifiers
- Aliases: PLS1, Fimbrin, plastin 1, DFNA76
- External IDs: OMIM: 602734; MGI: 104809; GeneCards: PLS1

Gene location (Human)
Chr.	Chromosome 3 (human)
Band	3q23	Start	142,596,393 bp
Band	3q23	End	142,713,664 bp

Gene location (Mouse)
Chr.	Chromosome 9 (mouse)
Band	9|9 E3.3	Start	95,634,695 bp
Band	9|9 E3.3	End	95,727,364 bp
RNA expression pattern
Bgee	Human / Mouse (ortholog); Top expressed in: secondary oocyte; jejunal mucosa; mucosa of ileum; mucosa of colon; mucosa of sigmoid colon; rectum; duodenum; palpebral conjunctiva; bronchial epithelial cell; mucosa of transverse colon / Top expressed in: intestinal villus; ileum; jejunum; duodenum; large intestine; left colon; pyloric antrum; vestibular sensory epithelium; epithelium of small intestine; yolk sac; More reference expression data
BioGPS	n/a
Gene ontology
Molecular function	calcium ion binding; actin binding; structural constituent of cytoskeleton; metal ion binding; actin filament binding
Cellular component	terminal web; extracellular exosome; brush border; cytoplasm; actin filament; actin filament bundle
Biological process	intestinal D-glucose absorption; regulation of microvillus length; terminal web assembly; positive regulation of multicellular organism growth; actin filament bundle assembly; actin filament network formation; actin crosslink formation; positive regulation of protein localization to plasma membrane
Sources:Amigo / QuickGO
Orthologs
Databases	NCBI: entry; OMA: entry
Species	Human	Mouse
Entrez	5357	102502
Ensembl	ENSG00000120756	ENSMUSG00000049493
UniProt	Q14651	Q3V0K9
RefSeq (mRNA)	NM_001145319; NM_001172312; NM_002670	NM_001033210
RefSeq (protein)	NP_001138791; NP_001165783; NP_002661	NP_001028382
Location (UCSC)	Chr 3: 142.6 – 142.71 Mb	Chr 9: 95.63 – 95.73 Mb
PubMed search
- Wikidata
View/Edit Human	View/Edit Mouse

Fimbrin also known as is plastin 1 is a protein that in humans is encoded by the PLS1 gene. Fimbrin is an actin cross-linking protein important in the formation of filopodia.

== Structure ==
Fimbrin belongs to the calponin homology (CH) domain superfamily of actin cross-linking proteins. Like other members of this superfamily, which include α-actinin, β-spectrin, dystrophin, ABP-120 and filamin, it has a conserved 27 kDa actin-binding domain that contains a tandem duplication of a sequence that is homologous to calponin. In addition to cross-linking actin filaments into bundles and networks, CH domains also bind intermediate filaments and some signal transduction proteins to the actin cytoskeleton. Structural comparison of actin filaments and fimbrin CH domain-decorated actin filaments has revealed changes in the actin structure due to fimbrin-mediated cross-linking that may affect the actin filaments' affinity for other actin-binding proteins and may be part of the regulation of the cytoskeleton itself.

In humans, three highly homologous, strictly tissue and locale specific isoforms have been identified: I-, T- and L-fimbrin. L-fimbrin is found in only normal or transformed leukocytes where it becomes phosphorylated in response to other factors such as interleukin-1. I-fimbrin is expressed by intestine and kidney epithelial cells. T-fimbrin is found in epithelial and mesenchymal cells derived from solid tissue where it does not become phosphorylated. Differences in expression, sequence and phosphorylation among the various fimbrin isoforms suggest the likelihood of functional differences.

== Function ==
Fimbrin is present in several distinct structures in different cell types, including intestinal microvilli, hair cell stereocilia and fibroblast filopodia. It is usually associated with polarized actin filaments in membrane ruffles, filopodia, stereocilia and adhesion plaques. Sequence homology and biochemical properties show that fimbrin is highly conserved from yeast to humans. Yeast mutants lacking fimbrin are defective in morphogenesis and endocytosis.

Owing to the close proximity of its tandem actin-binding domains, fimbrin directs the formation of tightly bundled actin filaments that participate in dynamic processes, including cytokinesis in yeast and host cell invasion by enteropathic bacteria. Although fimbrin's involvement in processes like these as well as its role in assembly and regulation of microfilament networks are well documented, there are fewer experimental data describing the overall domain organization of the molecule. Klein et al. (2004) detailed the crystal structure of the Arabidopsis thaliana and Schizosaccharomyces pombe fimbrin cores in an attempt to highlight the compact and distinctly asymmetric organization of the fimbrin molecule. This structural study of the fimbrin core represents the first detailed structural description of a functional actin cross-linking protein.
