= Monooxygenase =

Enzyme family

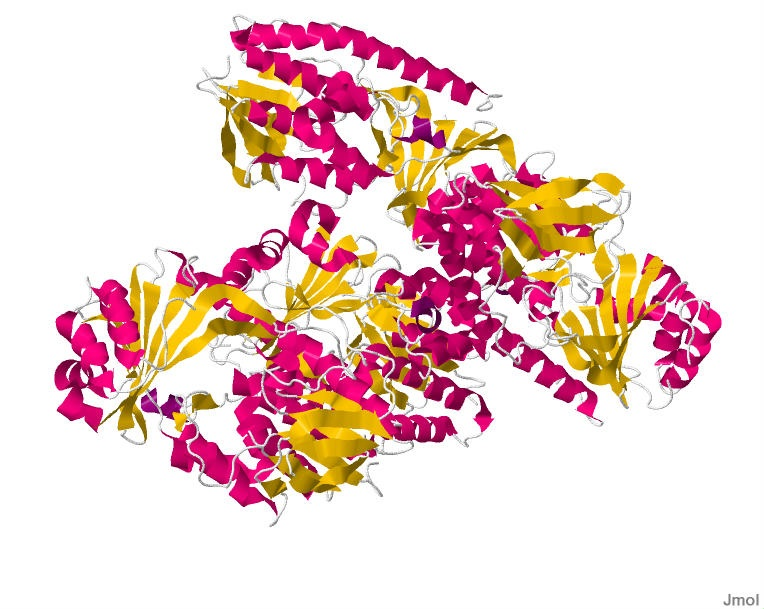
- Structure of the TetX monooxygenase in complex with the substrate 7-Iodtetracycline.

Identifiers
- Symbol: FAD_binding_3
- Pfam: PF01494
- InterPro: IPR002938
- SCOP2: 2phh / SCOPe / SUPFAM
Available protein structures:
- PDB: IPR002938 PF01494 (ECOD; PDBsum)
- AlphaFold: IPR002938; PF01494

Monooxygenases are enzymes that incorporate one hydroxyl group (−OH) into substrates in many metabolic pathways. In this reaction, the two atoms of dioxygen are reduced to one hydroxyl group and one H_{2}O molecule by the concomitant oxidation of NAD(P)H. One important subset of the monooxygenases, the cytochrome P450 omega hydroxylases, is used by cells to metabolize arachidonic acid (i.e. eicosatetraenoic acid) to the cell signaling molecules, 20-hydroxyeicosatetraenoic acid or to reduce or totally inactivate the activate signaling molecules for example by hydroxylating leukotriene B4 to 20-hydroxy-leukotriene B5, 5-hydroxyeicosatetraenoic acid to 5,20-dihydroxyeicosatetraenoic acid, 5-oxo-eicosatetraenoic acid to 5-oxo-20-hydroxyeicosatetraenoic acid, 12-hydroxyeicosatetraenoic acid to 12,20-dihydroxyeicosatetraenoic acid, and epoxyeicosatrienoic acids to 20-hydroxy-epoxyeicosatrienoic acids.

== Classification ==
They are classified as oxidoreductase enzymes that catalyze an electron transfer.

== Related structures ==
2XDO 2XYO 2Y6R

== Human proteins containing this domain ==
COQ6; CYP450; MICAL1; MICAL2; MICAL2PV1; MICAL2PV2; MICAL3;

== See also ==
- ABM domain
