= Tropomodulin 4 =

Protein found in humans

TMOD4

Identifiers
- Aliases: TMOD4, SK-TMOD, tropomodulin 4
- External IDs: OMIM: 605834; MGI: 1355285; GeneCards: TMOD4

Gene location (Human)
Chr.	Chromosome 1 (human)
Band	1q21.3	Start	151,169,986 bp
Band	1q21.3	End	151,176,284 bp

Gene location (Mouse)
Chr.	Chromosome 3 (mouse)
Band	3 F2.1|3 40.74 cM	Start	95,031,787 bp
Band	3 F2.1|3 40.74 cM	End	95,036,520 bp
RNA expression pattern
Bgee	Human / Mouse (ortholog); Top expressed in: vastus lateralis muscle; Skeletal muscle tissue of rectus abdominis; tibialis anterior muscle; biceps brachii; muscle of thigh; gastrocnemius muscle; Skeletal muscle tissue of biceps brachii; deltoid muscle; body of tongue; granulocyte / Top expressed in: triceps brachii muscle; sternocleidomastoid muscle; medial head of gastrocnemius muscle; temporal muscle; quadriceps femoris muscle; tibialis anterior muscle; vastus lateralis muscle; skeletal muscle tissue; muscle of thigh; digastric muscle; More reference expression data
BioGPS	n/a
Gene ontology
Molecular function	actin filament binding; actin binding; tropomyosin binding
Cellular component	cytoplasm; cytoskeleton; striated muscle thin filament; myofibril
Biological process	pointed-end actin filament capping; muscle contraction; actin filament organization; myofibril assembly
Sources:Amigo / QuickGO
Orthologs
Databases	NCBI: entry; OMA: entry
Species	Human	Mouse
Entrez	29765	50874
Ensembl	ENSG00000163157	ENSMUSG00000005628
UniProt	Q9NZQ9	Q9JLH8
RefSeq (mRNA)	NM_013353	NM_016712
RefSeq (protein)	NP_037485	NP_057921
Location (UCSC)	Chr 1: 151.17 – 151.18 Mb	Chr 3: 95.03 – 95.04 Mb
PubMed search
- Wikidata
View/Edit Human	View/Edit Mouse

Tropomodulin 4 (muscle) also known as TMOD4 is a protein which in humans is encoded by the TMOD4 gene.

== Function ==
This gene encodes a muscle-specific member of the tropomodulin family of actin-regulatory proteins. The encoded protein caps the pointed end of actin filaments preventing both elongation and depolymerization. The capping activity of this protein is dependent on its association with tropomyosin. Alternatively spliced transcript variants encoding different isoforms have been described.
