= Tropomodulin 2 =

Protein-coding gene in the species Homo sapiens

TMOD2

Identifiers
- Aliases: TMOD2, N-TMOD, NTMOD, tropomodulin 2
- External IDs: OMIM: 602928; MGI: 1355335; GeneCards: TMOD2

Gene location (Human)
Chr.	Chromosome 15 (human)
Band	15q21.2	Start	51,751,597 bp
Band	15q21.2	End	51,816,363 bp

Gene location (Mouse)
Chr.	Chromosome 9 (mouse)
Band	9 D|9 42.31 cM	Start	75,472,903 bp
Band	9 D|9 42.31 cM	End	75,518,607 bp
RNA expression pattern
Bgee	Human / Mouse (ortholog); Top expressed in: Brodmann area 23; endothelial cell; middle temporal gyrus; lateral nuclear group of thalamus; primary visual cortex; entorhinal cortex; pars compacta; parietal lobe; external globus pallidus; postcentral gyrus / Top expressed in: lateral septal nucleus; ventromedial nucleus; lateral geniculate nucleus; visual cortex; anterior amygdaloid area; primary visual cortex; lateral hypothalamus; mammillary body; primary motor cortex; dentate gyrus of hippocampal formation granule cell; More reference expression data
BioGPS	n/a
Gene ontology
Molecular function	actin binding; tropomyosin binding
Cellular component	cytoplasm; growth cone; neuron projection; cytoskeleton; striated muscle thin filament; myofibril
Biological process	pointed-end actin filament capping; positive regulation of G protein-coupled receptor signaling pathway; neuron-neuron synaptic transmission; nervous system development; learning or memory; muscle contraction; actin filament organization; myofibril assembly
Sources:Amigo / QuickGO
Orthologs
Databases	NCBI: entry; OMA: entry
Species	Human	Mouse
Entrez	29767	50876
Ensembl	ENSG00000128872	ENSMUSG00000032186
UniProt	Q9NZR1	Q9JKK7
RefSeq (mRNA)	NM_014548; NM_001142885	NM_001038710; NM_016711
RefSeq (protein)	NP_001136357; NP_055363	NP_001033799; NP_057920
Location (UCSC)	Chr 15: 51.75 – 51.82 Mb	Chr 9: 75.47 – 75.52 Mb
PubMed search
- Wikidata
View/Edit Human	View/Edit Mouse

Tropomodulin 2 (neuronal) also known as TMOD2 is a protein which in humans is encoded by the TMOD2 gene.

== Function ==
This gene encodes a neuronal-specific member of the tropomodulin family of actin-regulatory proteins. The encoded protein caps the pointed end of actin filaments preventing both elongation and depolymerization. The capping activity of this protein is dependent on its association with tropomyosin. Alternatively spliced transcript variants encoding different isoforms have been described.
