= LifeAct =

LifeAct is a 17 amino acid recombinant peptide that stains filamentous actin (F-actin) structures of eukaryotic living or fixed cells. There are several types and combinations of LifeAct that can be utilized depending on the cell type, protocol, and purpose of the analysis.

== Lifeact amino acid sequence ==
Lifeact 17 amino acid sequence is MGVADLIKKFESISKEE.

== Types ==
- LifeAct Plasmid
- LifeAct mRNA
- LifeAct Adenovirus
- LifeAct Lentivirus
- LifeAct Protein

== Chemistry ==
LifeAct-TagGFP2 being the most widely used fluorescent variant compared to other LifeAct constructs is composed of the first 17 amino acid from the Saccharomyces cerevisiae Abp140, an actin-binding protein. The Abp140 is highly conserved among Saccharomyces cerevisiae and other closely related organisms. The 17 amino acid fragment of Abp140 was genetically fused to GFP and fluoresces green when it binds the F-actin structures of living and fixed cells, allowing for visualization of cell mechanics under microscopes. Previous experiments involving the analysis of cell mechanics had depended on fluorescently labeled phalloidin and actin GFP fusion proteins obtained from utrophin in Xenopus laevis and ABP120 in Dictyostelium discoideum. However, due to their large protein size, markers such as phalloidin and GFP fusion proteins are limited to cells that can be transfected and tend to compete with their orthologous protein. These localization markers affect cellular mechanical properties and F-actin structures, thus making these markers unreliable. An alternative to these markers is Life Act-TagGFP2, which is a much smaller protein and does not affect cell mechanics. Cells synthesize LifeAct-TagGFP2 in a short period of time making it suitable as a cost-effective in vivo marker.

== Applications in biomedical research ==
LifeAct peptides have been used as a universal marker for F-actin visualization in biomedical research. An experiment conducted by Sawant et al. utilized LifeAct GFP to visualize the migration of control border cells in the ovaries of Drosophila flies, in order to determine how cells move in terms of small and large collectives during development and cancer. Lifeact labels F-actin in border cells and adjacent follicle cells allowed for the detailed examination of border cell membranes and protrusions. Studies regarding the degradation of actin cytoskeleton due to aging relied on LifeAct for the analysis of cytoskeletal organization as a function of age. Transgenic lines that expressed the LifeAct in various tissues of C. elegans were primarily used for imaging.
