= Ilona Banga =

Hungarian biochemist

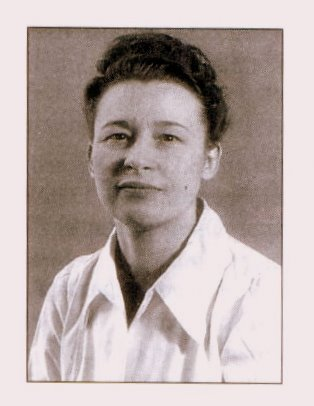
- Born: February 3, 1906; Hódmezővásárhely, southeastern Hungary
- Died: March 11, 1998 (aged 92); Budapest
- Education: University of Vienna, University of Debrecen (MSc in chemistry, 1929), University of Szeged
- Known for: co-discovery of elastase, characterization of actin and actomyosin, study of vitamin C and vitamin B1
- Spouse: József Mátyás Baló
- Children: Mátyás Baló
- Awards: Kossuth Prize (1955); Albert Szent-Györgyi Medal (1986)
- Scientific career
- Fields: biochemistry
- Workplaces: Institute for Medicinal Chemistry, University of Szeged; Institute of Pathology; University of Szeged
- Academic advisors: Albert Szent-Györgyi

Ilona Banga (1906–1998) was a Hungarian biochemist known for co-discovering actomyosin and working to characterize how actin and myosin interact to produce muscle contraction. She and her husband József Mátyás Baló discovered the first elastase – an enzyme capable of degrading the protein elastin which gives tissues like veins their flexibility. She also contributed to work that earned Albert Szent-Györgyi the Nobel Prize in Physiology or Medicine in 1937, including by developing methods for the purification and characterization of large quantities of vitamin C. During World War II she saved the equipment of the Institute of Chemistry of the University of Szeged.

== Early life and education ==
Banga was born February 3, 1906, in the southeastern Hungarian town of Hódmezővásárhely. She was interested in becoming a medical doctor but chose instead to study chemistry because her mother didn't think medical doctor was a proper profession for a woman.

She started studies in Szeged, continued at the University of Vienna and received an MSc in chemistry from the University of Debrecen in 1929. At the University of Debrecen she carried out Physiology research under the guidance of professor Fritz Verzár.

== Career ==
After graduating, she joined the laboratory of Albert Szent-Györgyi at the University of Szeged's Institute for Medicinal Chemistry as a research assistant – she was the first associate for this future Nobel laureate. Banga worked with Szent-Györgyi for almost fifteen years, resulting in 25 joint publications. Banga later spent time working abroad in Liege, Belgium, and Oxford, England. While in Oxford she worked with another future Nobel laureate, Severo Ochoa to study vitamin B1.

In 1945, Albert Szent-Györgyi moved his lab from Szeged to Budapest and Banga followed him there. She later became chief of the Chemical Laboratory of the First Institute of Pathological Anatomy in Budapest, where she studied arteriosclerosis and aging with her husband József Baló. She retired in 1970. After retiring she remained engaged in the scientific community, serving as a scientific advisor to the Gerontology Institute from 1971 to 1986.

Banga was never made a professor, even though (in 1950) she received her DSc degree, making her eligible. She was, however, the first woman to achieve the rank of docent (comparable to associate professor) at the University of Szeged (1940). She authored two scientific texts, including Structure and Function of Elastin and Collagen, and was a founder member of the Hungarian Biochemical Society.

== Research ==
Banga's initial work as Szent-Györgyi's associate involved studying carbohydrate metabolism. She developed methods for the large-scale purification of ascorbic acid (vitamin C) from Hungarian paprika – work that entailed extracting the vitamin from close to a metric ton of paprika. After winning the Nobel Prize in Physiology or Medicine in 1937 (for work to which Banga contributed), Albert Szent-Györgyi switched his lab's focus to researching muscle contraction, motivated by the findings of Engelhardt and Ljubimova that the muscle protein myosin wasn't merely a structural protein – it had phosphatase (ATPase) activity. Banga confirmed these findings and further characterized myosin's ability to split ATP. In the process, she co-discovered actomyosin.

In order to get myosin to analyze, Banga extracted it from rabbit muscles – she minced rabbit muscles and extracted myosin from them following an established high salt protocol. One time she ran out of time to do the extraction and left the minced muscle sitting in saline overnight and when she came back the next morning it had changed from its usual thin liquid appearance to a thick, viscous solution. They found that if they added ATP to it the viscosity would decrease. Further work by another lab member, Brunó Straub, showed that Banga had extracted a combination of actin and myosin, which they called actinomyosin. Straub was able to isolate the actin and he, Banga, and other members of the lab carried out extensive characterization of actin, myosin, and actinomyosin, showing that it is responsible for muscle contraction.

The widespread distribution of their findings was hampered by World War II – Szent-Györgyi was wanted for anti-Nazi activities and went into hiding, and other male colleagues left the lab to escape drafting. Banga remained behind and saved the Department of Medicinal Chemistry and its equipment by posting signs on the door in German, Hungarian, and Russian identifying the facilities as an infectious disease laboratory and reporting hours for the drop-off of infectious materials. These signs warded off would-be thieves and made the Department of Medicinal Library the only institution at the University to come out of WWII with all of its equipment and facilities preserved.

Albert Szent-Györgyi left Hungary for the United States after the war, but Ilona stayed and became chief of the Chemical Laboratory of the First Institute of Pathological Anatomy in Budapest. The new position also came with a shift in focus – she became deeply involved in gerontology, the study of aging, with a specific interest in how the connective tissue of blood vessel walls changes with age. She carried out seminal work on arteriosclerosis with her husband József Mátyás Baló. One area of their investigation determining what causes degradation of the elastin fibers holding together the walls of veins. They discovered an enzyme made by the pancreas could degrade elastin and named it elastase. This is now known to be only one of a class of peptidases capable of cleaving elastin, and the pancreatic elastase Banga and Baló found is unlikely to play a role in arteriosclerosis, but it was the first elastolytic enzyme discovered. The discovery was met with skepticism initially, but, by crystallizing elastase, Banga was able to clear up doubt. Banga further characterized this enzyme and published more than 60 articles on elastase, elastin, and related molecules and processes during the period from 1948 to 1965.

== Personal life ==
Banga married the pathologist József Mátyás Baló in Szeged in 1945, working closely with him on research on arteriosclerosis until his death in 1979. The couple had a son, Mátyás Jr., who became an academic dermatologist. Banga died March 11, 1998.

== Honors and awards ==
Banga was awarded the Kossuth Prize in 1955 for her discovery of elastase – it was offered to her in 1952 but in what's believed to be an oversight, her husband and co-discoverer József Mátyás Baló was not included so, responding that the work was a joint effort, she declined the offer, accepting it in 1955 when the offer was made to the pair of them. She was the first awardee of the University of Szeged's Albert Szent-Györgyi Commemorative Medal (1986) and was elected to the Leopoldina Academy in Halle, East Germany in 1962.

== Selected works ==
- "Myosin and Muscular Contraction" – in this report, Banga et al. describe their groundbreaking experiments leading to the discovery of actomyosin I Studies from the Institute of Medical Chemistry University Szeged 5–15
- Banga, I.; Szent-Györgyi, Albert (1934). "The large scale preparation of ascorbic acid from Hungarian pepper (Capsicum annuum)". Biochemical Journal. 28 (5): 1625–1628. doi:10.1042/bj0281625. ISSN 0264-6021. PMC 1253379. PMID 16745554.
- These archives contain Studies from the Institute of Medical Chemistry University Szeged – reports published by Banga and others in the Szent-Gyorgi laboratory during WWII "Actin Cytoskeleton Research Group – Archives". actin.aok.pte.hu.
