= József Mátyás Baló =

Hungarian physician and academic

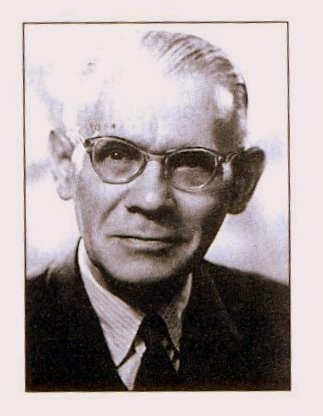
- Born: Hungarian Transylvania
- Education: Pázmány Péter Catholic University
- Medical career
- Profession: Physician
- Field: Neurology, Oncology
- Institutions: Pázmány Péter Catholic University Medical School; Ferencz József University of Szeged
- Research: Nervous System, Viruses and Tumours, Pancreatic enzymes.
- Awards: Kossuth Prize, Krompecher Ödön medallion

József Mátyás Baló (10 November 1895 – 9 October 1979) was a Hungarian physician and academic. He researched extensively into neurological conditions, cardiovascular conditions and with his wife isolated the enzyme elastase. He published numerous related papers and authored a medical book. He gave his name to Baló's disease.

== Early life ==
Born in Transylvania, the son of a minor noble, he graduated from Pázmány Péter Catholic University Medical School in 1919. He committed himself to pathology because at that time he wanted to work across the whole medical spectrum and this offered the best possibility.

== Career ==
Following graduation he took a lifelong affiliation with the Pázmány Péter Catholic University Medical School in Budapest. He worked under Karoly Schaffer and Kalman Buday and at that juncture he concentrated on the pathology of the nervous system publishing some papers about changes in the nervous system in pernicious anaemia and periarteritis nodosa.

In 1922 after receiving a Rockefeller Fellowship he spent two years at the Johns Hopkins University in Baltimore and Boston where he began work on virology. In 1926 he was appointed chairman of the Department of Pathology at St Stephen's Hospital (Szent István Khorház) At about this time Baló met a young lawyer who had developed an unusual fatal illness with aphasia, right hemiplegia and optic neuritis for which he underwent explorative surgery. The following day the patient died and Baló did a detailed post mortem examination of the man's brain where he found some changes which he recorded. This report was published in English the following year (1927) in the Archives of Neurology and Psychiatry where it generated wide interest. Baló named the condition "encephalitis periaxialis concentrica", which was later to be known as Baló's Disease. The disease had been noted before but Baló recorded it in more detail and published it. The disease belongs to a broad cluster of diseases which are characterised by degeneration and demyelination.

In 1926, Baló was appointed as a professor at the Faculty of Medicine in the Pázmány Péter University.

In 1928 Baló became chairman of the Pathological Institute at the Ferencz József University of Szeged in Hungary and also received the title of Privatdozent. He returned to the United States of America to continue his research in virology. He published papers about the role of viruses in the genesis and development of tumours, a ground-breaking idea at that time. He also continued to work at Szeged on diseases of the central nervous system and demyelinating diseases of the brain and spinal cord.

Baló was, as always, interested in all branches of medicine and in the 1930s began work on the causes of atherosclerosis. In 1940 he was elected in a minor capacity to the Hungarian Academy of Sciences and following WWII he was elected a full member. Also in 1940 he published his observations about the deleterious effects causing demyelinization in the central nervous system in a book (see below) From 1948, during the despotic Stalin era, he was expelled from the Academy and did not regain minor membership until a period of détente in 1956, achieving full membership only in 1974, when he was 78. During his time of expulsion Baló and his wife working together discovered and isolated the pancreatic enzyme elastase. In 1955 he and his wife were each awarded the Kossuth Prize. Returning to work at Pázmány Péter University after the war he was appointed chairman of the Institute of Forensic Pathology, the following year to be appointed Chairman of the Institute of Pathology, remaining in this position until his retirement in 1967. His primary goal was to rebuild the institute which had been badly damaged during the war. He went on to found the Cancer Research Institute and after his retirement continued to participate in research and lectures until his death. In 1975 he received the newly established Krompecher Ödön medallion of the Hungarian Society of Oncology.

== Bibliography ==
- (with Béla Korpássy) Warzen, Papillome und Krebs. (Warts, Papillomas and Cancer.) pub:K Rényi, Budapest, 1936.

- Die Erkrankungen der weißen Substanz des Gehirns und des Rückenmarks (Diseases of the White Matter of the Brain and Spinal Cord) pub:Barth Publishing, Leipzig-Budapest, 1940.

- (with Ádám Faragó) Lungenkarzinom und Lungenadenom (Cancer and Adenoma of the Lung), pub:Akadémiai Kiadó, Budapest, 1959.

- Logika (Logic) Pub:Tankonyvkiado, Budapest 1974. Hungarian. ISBN 978-963-17-0011-4.

== Family ==
Baló met Ilona Banga during his research work and married her at the age of 50. They continued to work together for the rest of his life. They produced one son, Mátyás Jr. who became a dermatologist in Budapest.

During his life Jószef Baló published more than 350 papers and was elected to several foreign scientific organizations, among them Deutsche Gesellschaft für Pathologie (1940), the Royal Society (1965), the Deutsche Akademie der Naturforscher-Leopoldina (1962) and the Pathology Society of Russia (1962)
