= Prefoldin =

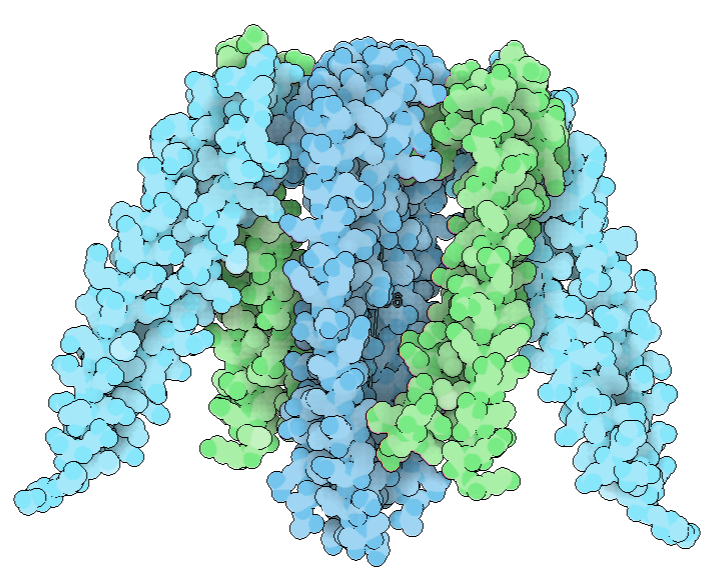
- Molecular model of M. thermautotrophicus Prefoldin (GimC). (PDB: 1FXK)

Identifiers
- Symbol: Prefoldin
- InterPro: IPR009053
- CATH: 1fxk
- SCOP2: 1fxk / SCOPe / SUPFAM
Available protein structures:
- PDB: IPR009053
- AlphaFold: IPR009053

Prefoldin (GimC) is a superfamily of proteins used in protein folding complexes. It is classified as a heterohexameric molecular chaperone in both archaea and eukarya, including humans. A prefoldin molecule works as a transfer protein in conjunction with a molecule of chaperonin to form a chaperone complex and correctly fold other nascent proteins. One of prefoldin's main uses in eukarya is the formation of molecules of actin for use in the eukaryotic cytoskeleton.

== Purpose and uses ==
Prefoldin is one family of chaperone proteins found in the domains of eukarya and archaea. Prefoldin acts in combination with other molecules to promote protein folding in cells where there are many other competing pathways for folding. Chaperone proteins perform non-covalent assembly of other polypeptide-containing structures in vivo. They are implicated in the folding of most other proteins.

In archaea, prefoldins are believed to function in combination with group II chaperonins in de novo protein folding. In eukarya however, prefoldins have acquired a more specific function: they are used to establish correct tubular assembly for many tubular proteins, such as actin. Actin accounts for 5-10% of all protein found in eukaryotic cells, which therefore means that prefoldin is quite prevalent in the cells. Actin is made of two strings of beads wound round each other and is one of the three main parts of the cytoskeleton of eukaryotic cells. Prefoldin bonds specifically to cytosolic chaperonin protein. This complex of prefoldin and chaperonin then forms molecules of actin in the cytosol. The prefoldin acts as a transporter molecule that transports bound, unfolded target proteins to the chaperonin (C-CPN) molecule.

For example, the prefoldin that is used in the formation of actin also transfers α or β tubulin to a cytosolic chaperonin. The prefoldin, however, does not form a ternary complex with tubulin and chaperonin. Once the tubulins are in contact with the chaperonin, the prefoldin automatically lets go and leaves the active site, due to its high affinity for the chaperonin molecule. Once the prefoldin is in contact with the chaperonin protein, it loses its affinity for the unfolded target protein.

Prefoldin is triggered only to bind to nonnative target proteins in the cytosol so that it will only bind to unfolded proteins. Unlike many other molecular chaperones, prefoldin does not use chemical energy, in the form of adenosine triphosphate (ATP), to promote protein folding.

== Discovery ==
Prefoldin was found by the laboratory of Nicholas J. Cowan from the Department of Biochemistry at the New York University Medical Center. It was discovered using chromatography. Unfolded labeled β-actin from bovine testes was put into solution. This solution contained an excess of cytosolic chaperonin (C-CPN), a eukaryotic chaperone protein necessary for actin folding. After gel filtration of the actin, the actin complex, consisting of actin and its bonded proteins, began to form and the molecular weight of the complex was observed. Gel electrophoresis was used to analyze the protein complex, the complex formed a single band that was excised and ran on an SDS gel. It resolved into five bands, therefore proving that a heterooligomeric protein is used to bind to unfolded actin.

An archaeal homolog of prefoldin that also functions as a molecular chaperone has been identified. Eukaryotic prefoldin likely evolved from archaea, as it is not present (or has been lost) from bacteria.

== Structure ==
Prefoldin is a hetero hexameric protein consisting of two α subunits and four β subunits. The beta subunits contain 120 amino acid residues each, while the α subunits contain 140 amino acid residues each. Each subunit was found to have a width of 8.4 nm in the archaea Methanococcus thermoautrophicum. The height was calculated at 1.8-2.6 nm. The subunits are arranged by hydrophobic interactions with two β barrels at the center and coiled-coil α helices protruding down from them as if it were a jellyfish.

The lower "tentacles" of the jellyfish shape is the interface between prefoldin and chaperonin.
