= Jasplakinolide =

Peptide that induces actin polymerization

Names
- IUPAC name Cyclo[(3R)-3-(4-hydroxyphenyl)-β-alanyl-(2S,4E,6R,8S)-8-hydroxy-2,4,6-trimethyl-4-nonenoyl-L-alanyl-2-bromo-N-methyl-D-tryptophyl]

Identifiers
CAS Number	102396-24-7
3D model (JSmol)	Interactive image
ChEMBL	ChEMBL257166
ChemSpider	52563404
KEGG	C16883
PubChem CID	9831636
CompTox Dashboard (EPA)	DTXSID30893487
- InChI: InChI=1S/C36H45BrN4O6/c1-20-15-21(2)17-23(4)47-32(43)19-30(25-11-13-26(42)14-12-25)40-35(45)31(18-28-27-9-7-8-10-29(27)39-33(28)37)41(6)36(46)24(5)38-34(44)22(3)16-20/h7-15,21-24,30-31,39,42H,16-19H2,1-6H3,(H,38,44)(H,40,45)/b20-15+/t21-,22-,23-,24-,30+,31+/m0/s1 Key: GQWYWHOHRVVHAP-DHKPLNAMSA-N
- SMILES: C[C@@H]\1C[C@@H](OC(=O)C[C@@H](NC(=O)[C@H](N(C(=O)[C@@H](NC(=O)[C@H](C/C(=C1)/C)C)C)C)CC2=C(NC3=CC=CC=C32)Br)C4=CC=C(C=C4)O)C

Properties
Chemical formula	C_{36}H_{45}BrN_{4}O_{6}
Molar mass	709.682 g·mol^{−1}
- Except where otherwise noted, data are given for materials in their standard state (at 25 °C [77 °F], 100 kPa). Infobox references

Jasplakinolide is a naturally occurring cyclo-depsipeptide. It was first isolated from a species of marine sponge named Jaspis johnstoni. It is permeable to the cell membrane meaning that it is able to cross the membrane. Once it crosses the cell membrane, it is a potent inducer and stabilizer of actin filaments meaning that it rapidly stabilizes pre-existing filaments and polymerize the protein actin. It also inhibits the disassembly of theses filaments. When doing this, it competes with phalloidin making it unable to bind with F-actin.

== Applications ==
Jasplakinolide is potentially important in medical applications showing anti-cancer, fungicidal and antiproliferative properties. It also has important scientific applications for the study of organelles, and actin filaments.
