= ACTG2 =

Protein-coding gene in humans

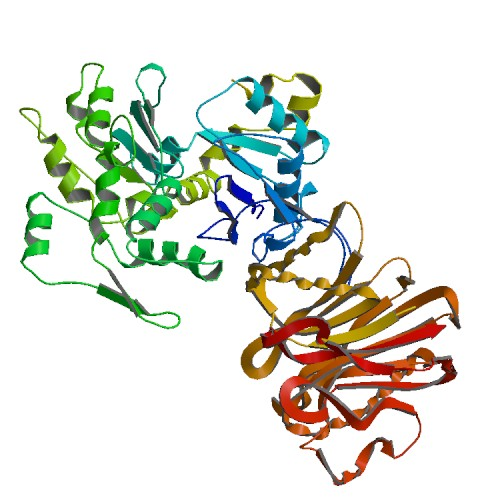

Identifiers
- Aliases: ACTG2, ACT, ACTA3, ACTE, ACTL3, ACTSG, VSCM, actin, gamma 2, smooth muscle, enteric, actin gamma 2, smooth muscle, VSCM1, MMIHS5
- External IDs: OMIM: 102545; MGI: 104589; GeneCards: ACTG2

Gene location (Human)
Chr.	Chromosome 2 (human)
Band	2p13.1	Start	73,892,314 bp
Band	2p13.1	End	73,919,865 bp

Gene location (Mouse)
Chr.	Chromosome 6 (mouse)
Band	6 C3|6 35.94 cM	Start	83,489,887 bp
Band	6 C3|6 35.94 cM	End	83,513,247 bp
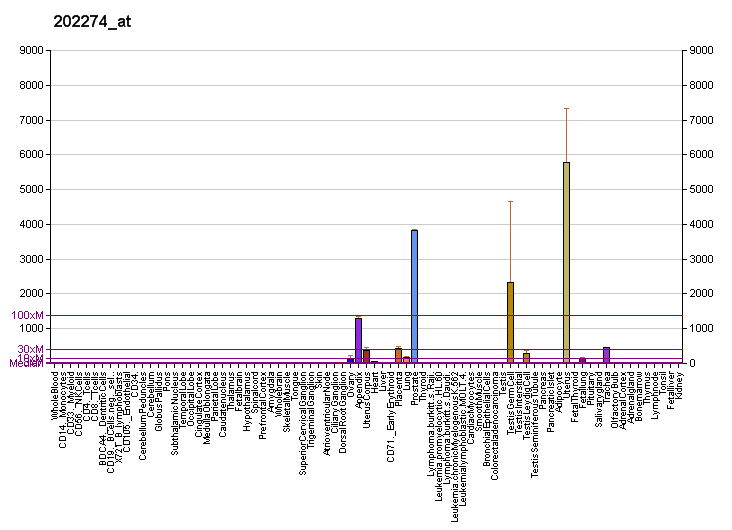
RNA expression pattern
Bgee	Human / Mouse (ortholog); Top expressed in: seminal vesicula; tail of epididymis; saphenous vein; muscle layer of sigmoid colon; gastric mucosa; popliteal artery; tibial arteries; prostate; myometrium; urethra / Top expressed in: umbilical cord; migratory enteric neural crest cell; cervix; left colon; ileum; seminal vesicula; pyloric antrum; seminiferous tubule; gallbladder; esophagus; More reference expression data
BioGPS	More reference expression data
Gene ontology
Molecular function	nucleotide binding; ATP binding
Cellular component	cytoplasm; filopodium; cell body; myosin filament; cytosol; blood microparticle; extracellular exosome; cytoskeleton; cell periphery; lamellipodium; extracellular space
Biological process	mesenchyme migration; positive regulation of gene expression; muscle contraction
Sources:Amigo / QuickGO
Orthologs
Databases	NCBI: entry; OMA: entry
Species	Human	Mouse
Entrez	72	11468
Ensembl	ENSG00000163017	ENSMUSG00000059430
UniProt	P63267	P63268
RefSeq (mRNA)	NM_001615; NM_001199893	NM_009610
RefSeq (protein)	NP_001186822; NP_001606	NP_033740
Location (UCSC)	Chr 2: 73.89 – 73.92 Mb	Chr 6: 83.49 – 83.51 Mb
PubMed search
- Wikidata
View/Edit Human	View/Edit Mouse

Actin, gamma-enteric smooth muscle is a protein that in humans is encoded by the ACTG2 gene.

Actins are highly conserved proteins that are involved in various types of cell motility, and maintenance of the cytoskeleton. In vertebrates, three main groups of actin isoforms, alpha, beta and gamma have been identified. The alpha actins are found in muscle tissues and are a major constituent of the contractile apparatus. The beta and gamma actins co-exist in most cell types as components of the cytoskeleton, and as mediators of internal cell motility. Actin, gamma 2, encoded by this gene, is a smooth muscle actin found in enteric tissues.

== Interactions ==
ACTG2 has been shown to interact with Emerin.
