= XPO6 =

Protein-coding gene in the species Homo sapiens

Identifiers
- Aliases: XPO6, EXP6, RANBP20, exportin 6
- External IDs: OMIM: 608411; MGI: 2429950; GeneCards: XPO6

Gene location (Human)
Chr.	Chromosome 16 (human)
Band	16p12.1	Start	28,097,976 bp
Band	16p12.1	End	28,211,965 bp

Gene location (Mouse)
Chr.	Chromosome 7 (mouse)
Band	7|7 F3	Start	125,700,887 bp
Band	7|7 F3	End	125,799,673 bp
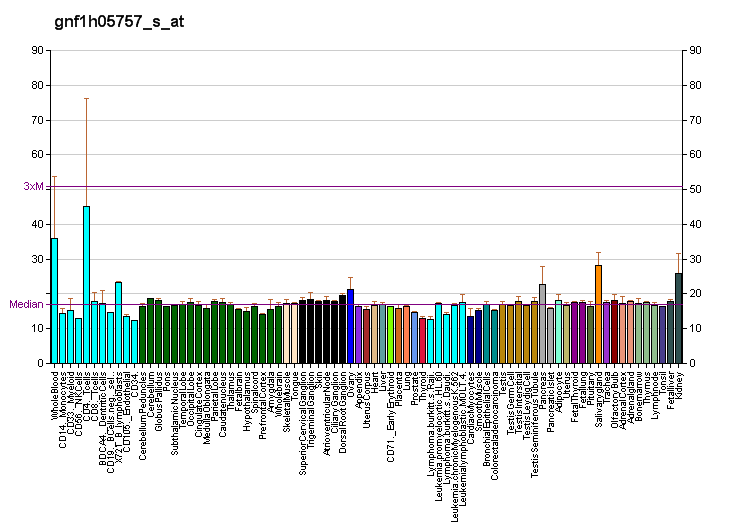

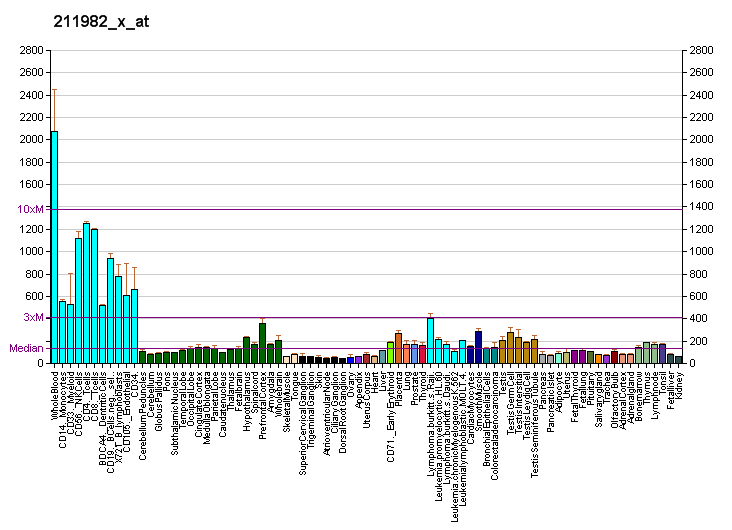

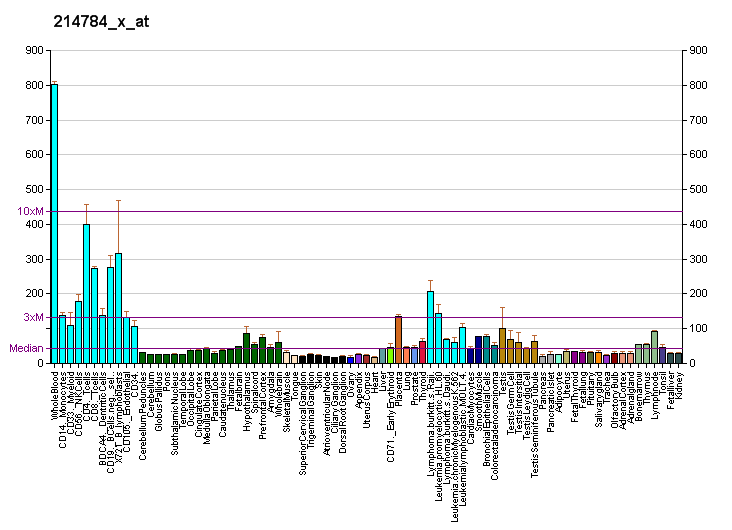
RNA expression pattern
Bgee	Human / Mouse (ortholog); Top expressed in: blood; granulocyte; left testis; right testis; spleen; epithelium of colon; C1 segment; tibial nerve; upper lobe of left lung; right frontal lobe / Top expressed in: tail of embryo; genital tubercle; granulocyte; spermatocyte; dentate gyrus of hippocampal formation granule cell; ventricular zone; spermatid; yolk sac; epiblast; seminiferous tubule; More reference expression data
BioGPS	More reference expression data
Gene ontology
Molecular function	protein binding; nuclear export signal receptor activity
Cellular component	plasma membrane; nucleolus; nucleus; cytoplasm; cytosol; protein-containing complex
Biological process	protein transport; intracellular protein transport; protein export from nucleus
Sources:Amigo / QuickGO
Orthologs
Databases	NCBI: entry; OMA: entry
Species	Human	Mouse
Entrez	23214	74204
Ensembl	ENSG00000169180	ENSMUSG00000000131
UniProt	Q96QU8	Q924Z6
RefSeq (mRNA)	NM_001270940; NM_015171	NM_028816; NM_001311143
RefSeq (protein)	NP_001257869; NP_055986	NP_001298072; NP_083092
Location (UCSC)	Chr 16: 28.1 – 28.21 Mb	Chr 7: 125.7 – 125.8 Mb
PubMed search
- Wikidata
View/Edit Human	View/Edit Mouse

Exportin-6 is a protein that in humans is encoded by the XPO6 gene.

Exportins, such as XPO6, recruit cargo in the nucleoplasm in the presence of Ran-GTP and form ternary export complexes. These complexes are transported through nuclear pore complexes to the cytoplasm, where GTP is hydrolyzed and the export complex is disassembled.
