= Tropomodulin =

Protein

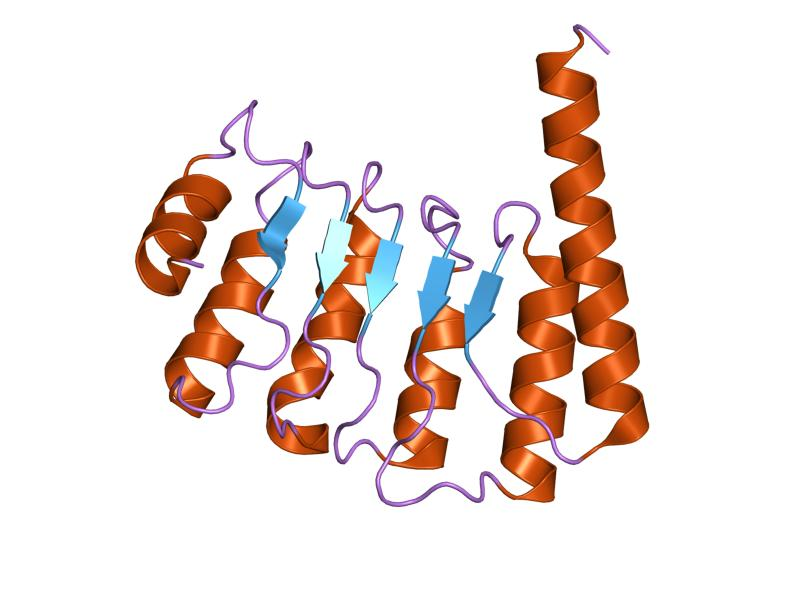
Tropomodulin

Tropomodulin (TMOD) is a protein which binds and caps the minus end of actin (the "pointed" end), regulating the length of actin filaments in muscle and non-muscle cells.

The protein functions by physically blocking the spontaneous dissociation of ADP-bound actin monomers from the minus end of the actin fibre. This, along with plus end capping proteins, such as capZ stabilise the structure of the actin filament. End capping is particularly important when long-lived actin filaments are necessary, for example: in myofibrils. Inhibition of tropomodulin capping activity leads to dramatic increase in thin filament length from its pointed end.

Actin filaments have two differing ends where one is the fast-acting barbed end and the other is the slow growing pointed end. Since TMOD binds to the pointed end of actin it is essential in cell morphology, cell movement, and muscle contraction. TMOD has been identified as an erythrocyte with 359 amino acids and it is a globular protein. When tropomyosin is not present Tropomodulin also assists in partially inhibiting elongation and depolymerization at the pointed filament ends. The N-terminal of Tropomodulin is rod shaped. This portion then binds to the N-terminal part of the two tropomyosin that are on the opposite part of the actin filaments in the muscle and nonmuscle cells. TMOD is able to have high-affinity binding through low-affinity interactions because of its ability to control subunit exchange of the pointed end of the actin filaments. When looking at epithelial cells Tropomodulin sustains F-actin in the lateral cell membranes and the adherens junction. Tropomodulin binds exclusively to the pointed filament ends and not to actin monomers or alongside actin filaments. Tropomodulin is a 40-kD tropomyosin-binding protein that was originally isolated from the red blood cell membrane skeleton. Tropomodulin is associated with Leiomodin as homologous proteins because both proteins play a role in muscle sarcomere thin filament formation and maintenance. An ortholog that is identified with TMOD and structurally similar is UNC-94. Where the UNC-94 protein is capping on the minus end of the actin filament. This protein like TMOD depends on the presence of tropomyosin in order to function properly.

== Genes ==
The TMOD genes are important for cell morphology, cell movement, and muscle contraction. There are 4 identified Tropomodulin genes identified in humans: TMOD1, TMOD2, TMOD3, and TMOD4. The 4 identified genes are also recognized as Isoforms. There are also known orthologs of these isoforms in mice. Known tropomodulin homologs have been identified in flies (Drosophila), worms (C.elegans), rats, chicks, and mice. The TMOD genes are expressed at different levels in human tissue. The different levels can be identified as: the first level is heart and skeletal muscle, then the next level is found in brain, lung, and pancreas, then the last level in placenta, liver, and kidney. Using the lab technique PCR TMOD gene was isolated and identified to have a total of 9 exons, allowing for the assumption that alternative promoters for tissue-specific expression and regulation. TMOD1, TMOD3, and TMOD4 are the only isoforms that are found in muscles. TMOD2 is the only identified isoform that is only found in the brain and not in any muscles like the other isoforms. The two isoforms that are associated with neurons are TMOD1 and TMOD2. The functions of each isoform can vary depending on the location of the Tropomyosin and actin filaments. Since the TMOD isoforms can influence stability of skeleton cells and regulate actin it can then be seen as essential for embryonic development.

- TMOD1
  - Tropomodulin 1 (TMOD1) can be found in various areas, but more specifically erythrocytes, the heart, and slow skeletal muscle. The structure for this protein varies slightly from the others where it has an N-terminus half and a C-Terminus half. The N-terminus half is seen to be mostly extended, unstructured, and flexible and the C-terminus half is seen to be compactly folded. The inhibition of TMOD1 where an antibody inhibits the C-terminus or a decrease in the expression of TMOD1 can cause the c-terminal filaments to go from compactly folded to elongated and thin filaments. Thus causing there to be a decrease in the ability of the heart to be able to contract. When looking at neurons TMOD1 is essential in synaptogenesis. TMOD1 is also important for spine morphogenesis and synapse formation where it can stabilize the F-actin. In epithelial cells, such as ocular lens fiber cells, TMOD1 is important in maintaining the stability of the tropomyosin and F-actin so that the cells stay tightly packed and maintain the tissues mechanical integrity.
- TMOD2
  - Tropomodulin 2 (TMOD2) is an isoform that is more commonly found in the brain. TMOD2 like the other Tropomodulins is able to bind to the pointed end of actin and tropomyosin. In doing so TMOD2 is able to regulate actin nucleation and polymerization. In regards to neurons TMOD 2 is essential in dendrite formation where it can regulate the branching of the dendrites. When looking at the ortholog in mice, if there is a lack of the TMOD2 gene there will be a result of hyperactivity and impaired learning and memory.
- TMOD3
  TMOD3 visual
  - Tropomodulin 3 (TMOD3) is found to be essential in membranous skeleton and embryonic development. TMOD3 is a wide ranging tropomodulin gene in non-erythroid cells, in which it regulates actin processes, such as lamellipodia protrusion and cell motility. Lamellipodia protrusion, dense actin filaments, are usually found in neurons and epithelial cells where TMOD3 is mostly found. Change in regulation and reduction can drastically change the function of neurons or epithelial cells. We also find the gene TMOD 3 in polarized epithelial cell plasma membranes and the sarcoplasmic reticulum membranes of skeletal muscle. This TMOD is the only isoform of the 4 known to be found in the human platelet proteome. The way that TMOD3 functions in actin membranous skeleton structures is by capping the F-actin in stress fibers. If TMOD3 is not present there will be impaired erythroblast maturation in definitive erythropoiesis. TMOD3 actin binding is regulated via phosphatidylinositol 3-kinase (PI3K)–Akt signaling in adipocytes, where Tmod3 regulation of cortical actin assembly with Tropomyosin. The regulation of TMOD3 is essential for insulin-mediated trafficking of the glucose transporter Glut4 to the plasma membrane. In intestinal epithelial cells if there is a reduction in TMOD3 the binding of tropomyosin and F-actin will be disrupted and cause the cell height to collapse. This collapse in cell height can change the overall functionality of the intestinal cells.
- TMOD4
  - Tropomodulin 4 (TMOD4) is found essential for muscles where it regulates thin filament length and can switch between myogenesis and adipogenesis. TMOD4 Function has at least one point in common with the protein LMOD3 during skeletal myofibrillogenesis.
