= Cytoskeletal drugs =

Substances or medications that interact with actin or tubulin

Cytoskeletal drugs are small molecules that interact with the cytoskeletal proteins actin or tubulin. These drugs affect the cytoskeleton in one of three main ways: stabilizing cytoskeletal filaments, preventing the polymerization of protein monomers, or promoting the depolymerization of existing filaments.

Drugs that target microtubules, such as paclitaxel (taxol), are often used in chemotherapy for the treatment of cancer. In contrast, drugs that target actin have limited clinical use due to severe off-target effects but remain valuable tools in cellular research.

== Mechanisms of action ==
Cytoskeletal drugs can interfere with the normal dynamics of actin filaments and microtubules through several mechanisms.

Stabilization
Some drugs bind to and stabilize existing cytoskeletal polymers, preventing their depolymerization. Notable examples include taxol, which stabilizes microtubules, and phalloidin, which stabilizes actin filaments.
Inhibition of polymerization
Other drugs bind to free monomers and prevent them from polymerizing. Cytochalasin D, for instance, binds to actin monomers, while colchicine prevents the polymerization of microtubules.
Promotion of depolymerization
Certain drugs enhance the disassembly of already formed polymers. Demecolcine acts by promoting the depolymerization of microtubules.

Some drugs exhibit multiple effects. Latrunculin, for example, both prevents actin polymerization and enhances the rate of filament depolymerization.

== Microtubule-targeting drugs ==
Drugs that target microtubules are frequently used in the clinic, primarily as anticancer agents in chemotherapy. By disrupting microtubule dynamics, these drugs interfere with mitosis in rapidly dividing cancer cells. Examples include:

- Paclitaxel (taxol), which stabilizes microtubules and halts mitosis.
- Vinblastine, nocodazole, and colchicine, which prevent the polymerization of tubulin monomers.
- Demecolcine, which actively depolymerizes formed microtubules.
- Rotenone, which prevents polymerization and is used as a pesticide.

== Actin-targeting drugs ==
The clinical use of actin-targeting drugs in animals is limited by a lack of specificity, as they cannot distinguish between different forms of actin (e.g., muscle vs. cytoskeletal). This leads to unacceptable off-target effects. However, these compounds are useful research tools for understanding the cell's internal machinery. For example, phalloidin conjugated with a fluorescent probe can be used to visualize actin filaments in fixed cell samples.

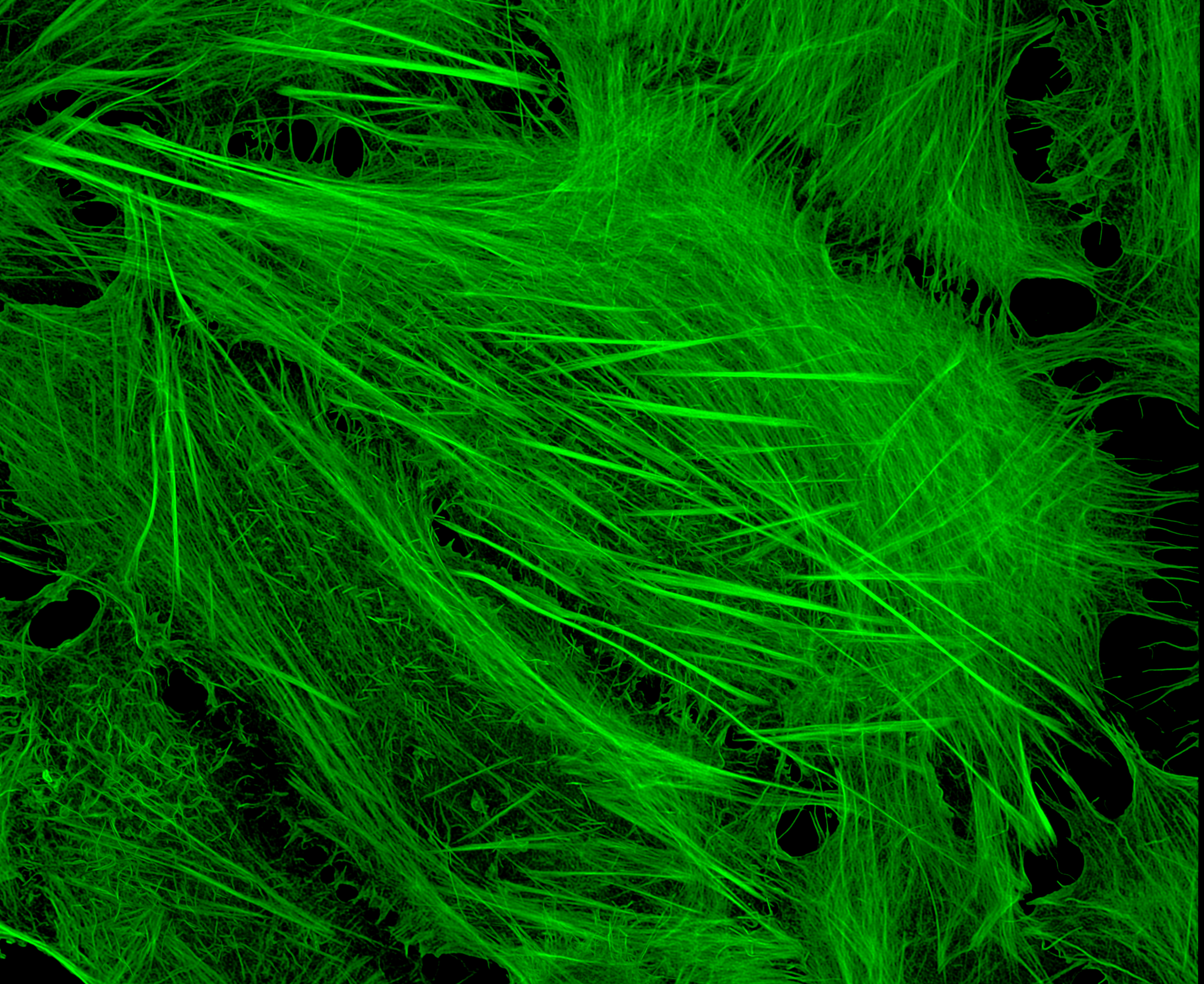
A cancer cell that was fixed and stained with phalloidin to visualize the actin cytoskeleton.

=== Depolymerizing agents ===
Cytochalasin D and latrunculin both promote the depolymerization of actin filaments but through different mechanisms. When added to live cells, they disassemble the actin cytoskeleton and inhibit cell movements like locomotion.

- Cytochalasin D, a fungal alkaloid, binds to the (+) end of F-actin and blocks the addition of new actin subunits.
- Latrunculin, a toxin secreted by sponges, binds to and sequesters G-actin monomers, preventing their addition to a filament end.

=== Stabilizing agents ===
In contrast to the above, other toxins stabilize actin filaments.

- Jasplakinolide, a toxin from sponges, binds to and stabilizes actin dimers by enhancing nucleation. This lowers the critical concentration required to form filaments.
- Phalloidin, a phallotoxin from the Amanita phalloides mushroom, prevents filament depolymerization by binding between F-actin subunits and locking them together. This paralyzes the cell, leading to cell death.

== Toxicity of phallotoxins ==
Phallotoxins are isolated from A. phalloides, commonly known as the "death cap" mushroom, which has been involved in fatal cases of mushroom poisoning. Ingestion of the mushroom most commonly affects the liver and kidneys, causing symptoms that can include jaundice and seizures, ultimately resulting in death within hours. Three classes of toxins are found in A. phalloides: amatoxins, phallotoxins, and virotoxins. Like phallotoxins, virotoxins also interact with actin to prevent filament depolymerization, disrupting cytoskeletal function and paralyzing susceptible cells.

== Summary table ==
The following table summarizes the targets and effects of several common cytoskeletal drugs.

Drug Name	Target cytoskeletal component	Effect	Applications
Colchicine	Microtubule	Prevents polymerization	Used to treat gout
Cytochalasins	Actin	Prevents polymerization	None
Demecolcine	Microtubule	Depolymerizes	Chemotherapy
Latrunculin	Actin	Prevent polymerization, enhance depolymerisation	None
Jasplakinolide	Actin	Enhances polymerization	None
Nocodazole	Microtubule	Prevents polymerization	None
Paclitaxel (taxol)	Microtubule	Stabilizes microtubules and therefore prevents mitosis	Chemotherapy
Phalloidin	Actin	Stabilizes filaments	None
Swinholide	Actin	Sequesters actin dimers	None
Vinblastine	Microtubule	Prevents polymerization	Chemotherapy
Rotenone	Microtubule	Prevents polymerization	Pesticide

== See also ==
- Actin-binding protein
