= Tunneling nanotube =

Biological structure

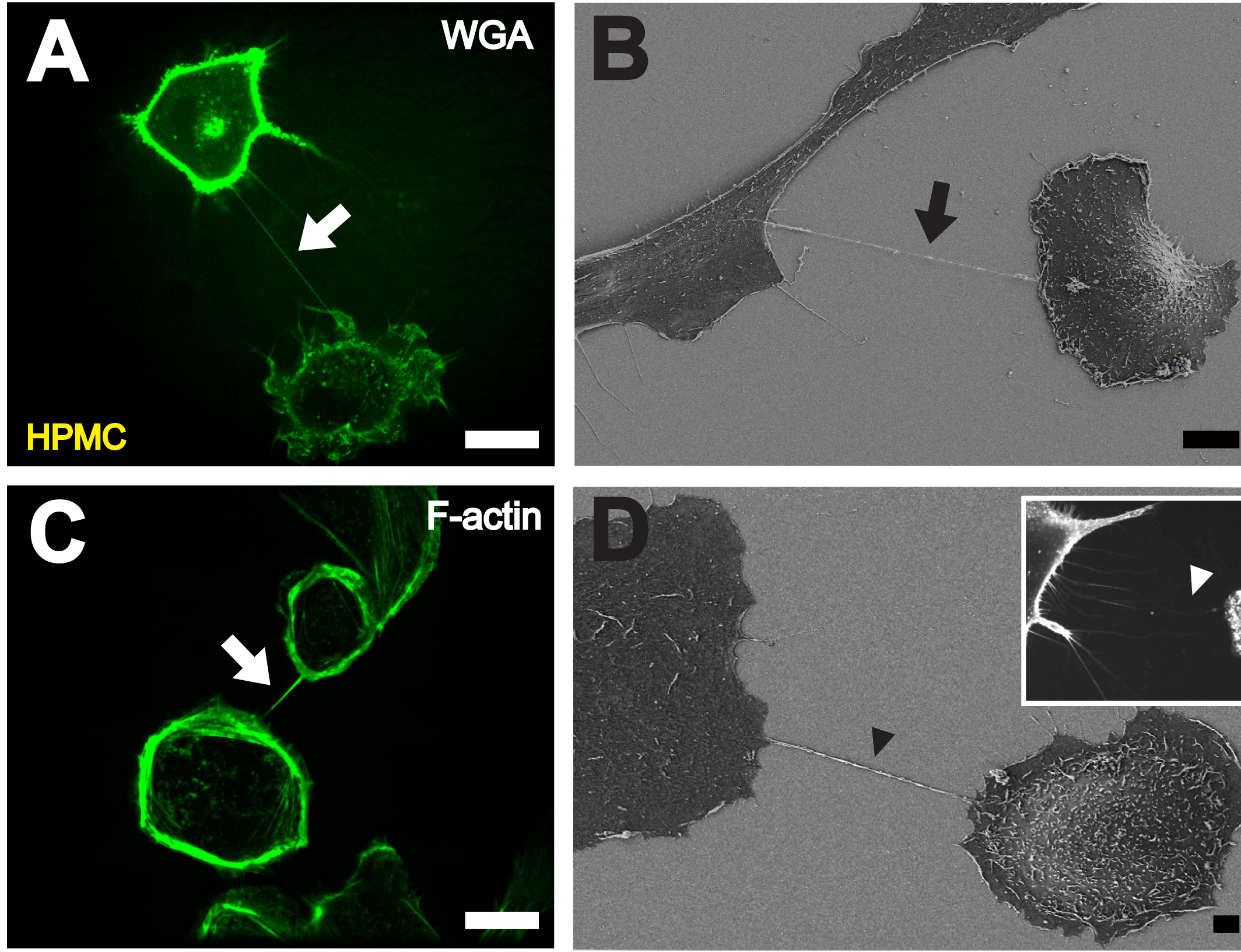
A High resolution 3D live-cell fluorescence image of a tunneling nanotube (TNT) (white arrow) connecting two primary mesothelial cells. Scale bar: 20 μm. B Depiction of a TNT (black arrow) between two cells with scanning electron microscopy. Scale bar: 10 μm. C Fluorescently labeled F-actin (white arrow) present in TNTs between individual HPMCs. Scale bar: 20 μm. D Scanning electron microscope image of a potential TNT precursor (black arrowhead). Insert shows a fluorescence microscopic image of filopodia-like protrusions (white arrowhead) approaching a neighboring cell. Scale bar: 2 μm.

A tunneling nanotube (TNT) or membrane nanotube is a term that has been applied to cytoskeletal protrusions that extend from the plasma membrane which enable different animal cells to connect over long distances, sometimes over 100 μm between certain types of cells. Tunneling nanotubes that are less than 0.7 micrometers in diameter, have an actin structure and carry portions of plasma membrane between cells in both directions. Larger TNTs (>0.7 μm) contain an actin structure with microtubules and/or intermediate filaments, and can carry components such as vesicles and organelles between cells, including whole mitochondria. The diameter of TNTs ranges from 0.05 μm to 1.5 μm and they can reach lengths of several cell diameters. There have been two types of observed TNTs: open ended and closed ended. Open ended TNTs connect the cytoplasm of two cells. Closed ended TNTs do not have continuous cytoplasm as there is a gap junction cap that only allows small molecules and ions to flow between cells. These structures have shown involvement in cell-to-cell communication, transfer of nucleic acids such as mRNA and miRNA between cells in culture or in a tissue, and the spread of pathogens or toxins such as HIV and prions. TNTs have observed lifetimes ranging from a few minutes up to several hours, and several proteins have been implicated in their formation and inhibition, including many that interact with Arp2/3.

== History ==
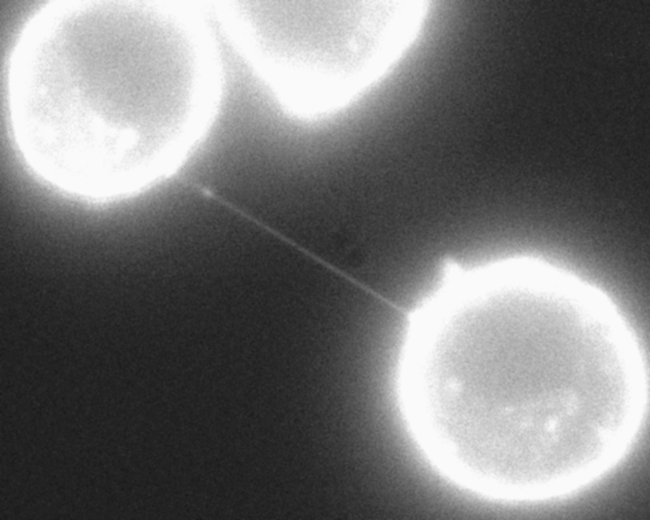
3D live-cell microscopy of immunofluorescent rat PC12 cells demonstrating tunneling nanotubes. From one of the first published papers to describe the phenomenon in 2004.

Membrane nanotubes were first described in a 1999 Cell article examining the development of Drosophila melanogaster wing imaginal discs. More recently, a Science article published in 2004 described structures that connected PC12 cells together, as well as other types of cell cultures. This study coined the term "tunneling nanotubes" and also showed that nanotube formation between cells is correlated with both membrane and organelle transfer. Since these publications, more TNT-like structures have been recorded, containing varying levels of F-actin, microtubules and other components, but remaining relatively homogenous in terms of composition.

== Formation ==
Several mechanisms may be involved in nanotube formation. These include molecular controls as well as cell-to-cell interactions.

Two primary mechanisms for TNT formation have been proposed. The first involves cytoplasmic protrusions extending from one cell to another, where they fuse with the membrane of the target cell. The other mechanism occurs when two previously connected cells move away from one another, and TNTs remain as bridges between the two cells.

=== Induction ===
Some dendritic cells and THP-1 monocytes have been shown to connect via tunneling nanotubes and display evidence of calcium flux when exposed to bacterial or mechanical stimuli. TNT-mediated signaling has shown to produce spreading in target cells, similar to the lamellipodia produced when dendritic cells are exposed to bacterial products. The TNTs demonstrated in this study propagated at initial speed of 35 micrometers/second and have shown to connect THP-1 monocytes with nanotubes up to 100 micrometers long.

Phosphatidylserine exposure has demonstrated the ability to guide TNT formation from mesenchymal stem cells (MSCs) to a population of injured cells. The protein S100A4 and its receptor have been shown to guide the direction of TNT growth, as p53 activates caspase 3 to cleave S100A4 in the initiating cell, thereby generating a gradient in which the target cell has higher amounts of the protein. These findings suggests that chemotactic gradients may be involved in TNT induction.

One study found that cell-to-cell contact was necessary for the formation of nanotube bridges between T cells. p53 activation has also been implicated as a necessary mechanism for the development of TNTs, as the downstream genes up-regulated by p53 (namely EGFR, Akt, PI3K, and mTOR) were found to be involved in nanotube formation following hydrogen peroxide treatment and serum starvation. Connexin-43 has shown to promote connection between bone marrow stromal cells (BMSCs) and alveolar epithelial cells, leading to the formation of nanotubes.

Cellular stress by rotenone or TNF-α was also shown to induce TNT formation between epithelial cells. Inflammation by lipopolysaccharides or interferon-γ has shown to increase the expression of proteins related to TNT formation.

=== Inhibition ===
While TNTs have many components, their main inhibitors work by blocking or limiting actin formation. TNT-like structures called streamers, which are extremely thin protrusions, did not form when cultured with cytochalasin D, an F-actin depolymerizing compound. A separate study using cytochalasin B found that it impacted TNT formation without the destruction of existing TNTs. Latrunculin-B, another F-actin depolymerizing compound, was found to completely block TNT formation. Blocking CD38, which had been implicated in the release of mitochondria by astrocytes, also significantly decreased TNT formation.

TNFAIP2, also called M-Sec, is known to mediate TNT formation, and knockdown of this protein by shRNA reduced TNT development in epithelial cells by about two-thirds.

Inhibiting Arp2/3 directly resulted in different effects depending on cell type. In human eye cells and macrophages, blocking Arp2/3 led to a decrease in TNT formation. However, such inhibition in neuronal cells resulted in an increase in the amount of cells connected via TNTs, while lowering the total amount of TNTs connecting cells.

== Role in intercellular transfer ==
=== Mitochondria ===
Malignant cancer cells can connect via tunneling nanotubes.

Tunneling nanotubes have been implicated as one mechanism by which whole mitochondria can be transferred from cell to cell. A recent study in Nature Nanotechnology has reported that cancer cells can hijack the mitochondria from immune cells via physical tunneling nanotubes. Mitochondrial DNA damage appears to be the main trigger for the formation of TNTs in order to traffic entire mitochondria, though the exact threshold of damage necessary to induce TNT formation is yet unknown. The maximum speed of mitochondria traveling over TNTs was found to be about 80 nm/s, lower than the measured speed of 100-1400 nm/s of axonal transport of mitochondria; this could be due to the smaller diameter of TNTs inhibiting mitochondrial migration.

In one study, Ahmad et al. used four lines of mesenchymal stem cells, each expressing either a differing phenotype of the Rho-GTPase Miro1; a higher level of Miro1 was associated with more efficient mitochondrial transfer via TNTs. Several studies have shown, through the selective blockage of TNT formation, that TNTs are a primary mechanism for the trafficking of whole mitochondria between heterogeneous cells.

One use of this phenomenon is in the recovery from heart attacks. When cardiac muscle cells are injured by oxygen deprivation, the damaged mitochondria release reactive oxygen species, which trigger nearby mesenchymal stem cells to produce and donate healthy mitochondria to the damaged muscle cells through TNTs.

=== Action potential ===
Tunneling nanotubes have been shown to propagate action potentials via their extensions of endoplasmic reticulum that propagate Ca^{2+} influx through active diffusion.

=== Viruses ===
Many viruses can transfer their proteins to TNT-connected cells. Certain types, such as influenza, have even been found to transfer their genome via TNTs. Over two dozen types of viruses have been found to transfer through and/or modulate TNT. A 2022 study suggests that SARS-CoV-2 builds tunneling nanotubes from nose cells to gain access to the brain.

HIV also appears to spread through TNTs, specifically between dendritic cells. Researchers have found that "Long-term nonprogressors" of HIV, who can control the virus without antiretroviral therapy, have a defect in their dendritic cells' ability to create TNTs.

=== Prions ===
Prions can also spread through TNTs.

=== Nanomedicine ===
Tunneling nanotubes have the potential to be involved in applications of nanomedicine, as they have shown the ability to transfer such treatments between cells. Future applications look to either inhibit TNTs to prevent nanomedicine toxicity from reaching neighboring cells, or to promote TNT formation to increase positive effects of the medicine.

== TNT-like structures ==
While TNT-like structures are all made of cytoskeletal cellular protrusions, their fundamental difference with TNTs is in the connection between two cells. TNT-like structures do not share intracellular contents such as ions or small molecules between connected cells–a feature that is present in both open ended and closed ended TNTs.

A TNT-like structure called a cytoneme enables exchanges between signaling centers. The formation of cytonemes towards a FGF homolog gradient has been observed, suggesting that chemotactic controls may also induce the formation of TNT-like structures. Cytonemes, however, do not always connect the membrane two cells and can act solely as environmental sensors.

Plasmodesmata have been identified as functional channels interconnecting plant cells, and stromules interconnect plastids.

Myopodia are actin-rich cytoplasmic extensions which have been observed in embryonic Drosophila. Similar structures have been observed in Xenopus and mouse models. Actin-containing cellular protrusions dubbed "streamers" have been observed in cultured B cells.

Vesicular transport in membrane nanotubes has been modeled utilizing a continuum approach. A variety of synthetic nanotubes, based on stacking of cyclic peptides and other cyclic molecules, have been investigated.

== See also ==
- Horizontal transfer of mitochondria
