= Engleromyces sinensis =

Conservation status
- Vulnerable (IUCN 3.1)

Scientific classification
- Kingdom: Fungi
- Division: Ascomycota
- Class: Sordariomycetes
- Order: Xylariales
- Family: Xylariaceae
- Genus: Engleromyces
- Species: E. sinensis

Binomial name
- Engleromyces sinensis M.A.Whalley, A.Khalil, T.Z.Wei, Y.J.Yao & Whalley (2010)
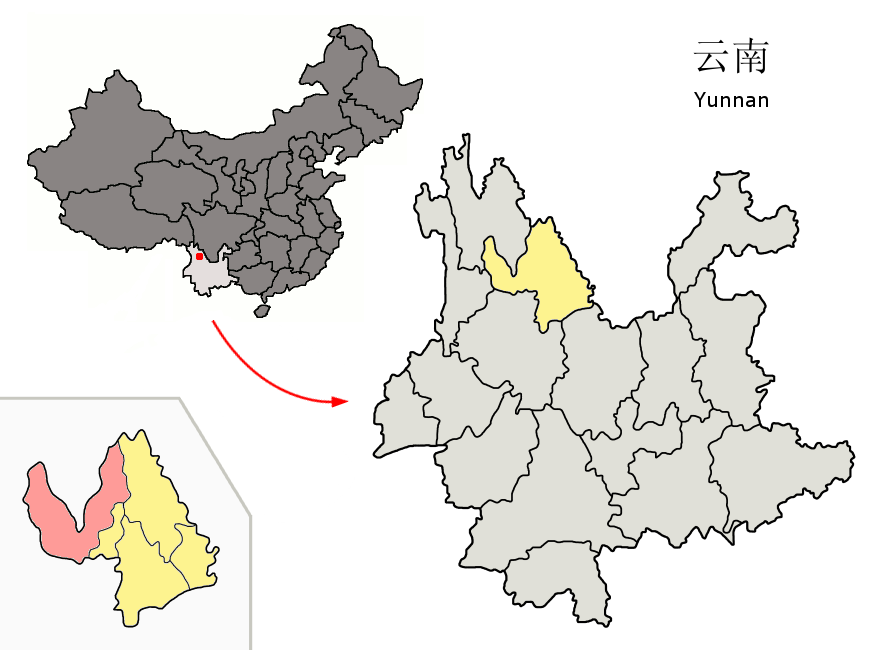
- Location of Yulong County within Yunnan, China, the type location of Engleromyces sinensis

Species of fungus

Engleromyces sinensis is a species of fungus in the family Xylariaceae. It was described as new to science in 2010, based on specimens collected in 1958 and incorrectly identified as Engleromyces goetzii. The fungus is known only from China, where it grows on bamboo culms. It forms fruit bodies in the shape of two roughly circular buff-colored lobes measuring up to 50 cm (20 in) in diameter that envelop the bamboo. E. sinensis has been used as a folk remedy against cancer and infection in Tibet, Yunnan, and Sichuan Provinces. Several bioactive metabolites have been isolated and identified from the fungus.

== Discovery ==
Engleromyces sinensis was described as a new species in 2010. The authors were studying members of the family Xylariaceae that were housed in the Mycological Herbarium of the Chinese Academy of Sciences in Beijing, and discovered that five specimens labeled as E. goetzii, collected from Jade Dragon Snow Mountain (Yunnan Province) in 1958, did not match descriptions of the species published by Paul Christoph Hennings (1900), Curtis Gates Lloyd (1917), R.W.G. Dennis (1961) or Jack Rogers (1981). These species descriptions, which were based on collections made in Africa, convinced the authors that the Chinese collections were sufficiently different from E. goetzii to warrant describing a new species. Prior to this discovery, Engleromyces was a monotypic genus. The specific epithet sinensis means "Chinese".

== Description ==
The fruit bodies of Engleromyces sinensis form two roughly spherical lobes that partially envelop the bamboo substrate. The official description gives dimensions of 4.3–4.9 cm (1.7–1.9 in) by 4–5.5 cm (1.6–2.2 in) and 1.6–4 cm (0.6–1.6 in) in height, although specimens in markets measuring 10 to 50 cm (4 to 20 in) in diameter have been noted. When young, the surface is buff-colored with a pinkish hue and slightly dimpled surface; the color changes to grayish-brown and the surface becomes smoother as the fungus matures. The internal flesh is buff colored, with a firm texture that later becomes woody. The ostioles (minute openings through which spores are released), which are scattered about the surface of the fruit bodies, are somewhat nipple-like when young but later become sharper (punctate). Situated under a crust with a thickness of about 1 mm, the perithecia are arranged in rows. They are spherical to flask shaped, with eight-spored asci. The asci are funnel or T-shaped, somewhat like a golf tee, and measure about 4 by 4 μm. They have an apical apparatus (a region at the ascus tip that forms the spore-shooting mechanism) that stains blue in Melzer's reagent. The smooth, black ascospores are lined up in a single row, and feature drop-like appendages that are visible when still in the ascus. Measuring 15–19 by 11.5–12.5 μm, they are broadly inequilateral with one or both ends shortened, and lack a germ pore.

In contrast to E. goetzii (the type species of Engleromyces), E. sinensis has smaller spores, and an apical apparatus that is T-shaped rather than cuboid. E. goetzii fruit bodies can grow quite large–"to the size of a football"– and weigh up to 4 kilograms (8.8 lb). They only grow on the African alpine bamboo (Yushania alpina). The Siamese jelly ball fungus, Gelatinomyces siamensis, produces fruit bodies that are superficially similar to those of E. sinensis. However, the former are smaller, have a gelatinous texture, and are only found in Thailand, where they grow on bamboo culms and branches at elevations ranging from 390–840 m (1,280–2,760 ft).

== Habitat and distribution ==
Engleromyces sinensis is known only from China, including its type location in Yunnan, China, in Yulong County. The fungus has also been collected from Mêdog County (Tibet), where it was found growing in a coniferous forest. It has been collected at elevations between 2,000 to 3,500 m (6,600 to 11,500 ft). Fruit bodies grow on and partially envelop bamboo culms. Specifically, E. sinensis has been recorded from a species of bamboo variously known as Fargesia melanostachys or F. yulongshanensis, depending on the authority. Engleromyces collections made in Nepal, initially identified as E. goetzii, are likely to be E. sinensis.

== Research ==
Engleromyces sinensis is used in China in traditional medicine for its antibiotic and antiinflammatory properties, and is sold in market stalls in Yunnan. Several bioactive metabolites have been isolated and identified from the fungus. It produces engleromycin, a cytochalasin. This compound, which is also made by E. goetzii, has antibiotic and cytotoxic activity. Additional metabolites include the novel compound neoengleromycin, and the previously known cytochalasin D and 19,20-epoxycytochalasin D. Neoengleromycin has an unusual chemical structure featuring a rare amine-substituted hydroxamic acid skeleton.
