= Galp =

Galp may refer to:

- Galp Energia, an oil and gas company from Portugal
- GalP (protein), an integral membrane protein present in Escherichia Coli
- Glyceraldehyde 3-phosphate
- Galanin-like peptide, a neuropeptide
