= Cytochalasin E =

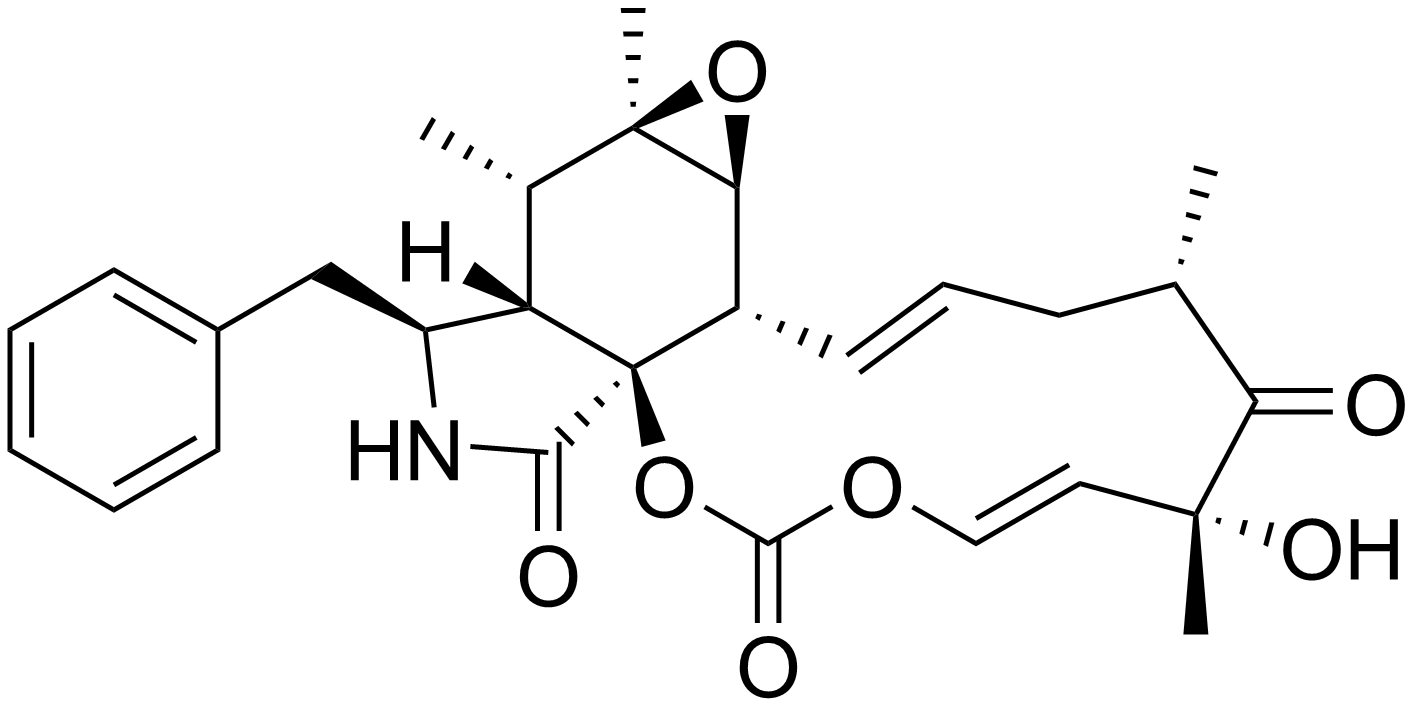

Names
- Preferred IUPAC name (4E,6R,8S,10E,11aS,11bS,12aR,13S,13aS,14S)-14-Benzyl-6-hydroxy-6,8,12a,13-tetramethyl-9,11a,11b,12a,13,13a,14,15-octahydro-2H-[1,3]dioxacyclotridecino[4,5-d]oxireno[2,3-f]isoindole-2,7,16(6H,8H)-trione

Identifiers
CAS Number	36011-19-5
3D model (JSmol)	Interactive image
ChEBI	CHEBI:68201
ChEMBL	ChEMBL494856
ChemSpider	4572350
ECHA InfoCard	100.048.018
EC Number	252-835-7
KEGG	C19953
PubChem CID	5458385
CompTox Dashboard (EPA)	DTXSID60894866
- InChI: InChI=1S/C28H33NO7/c1-16-9-8-12-19-23-27(4,35-23)17(2)21-20(15-18-10-6-5-7-11-18)29-24(31)28(19,21)36-25(32)34-14-13-26(3,33)22(16)30/h5-8,10-14,16-17,19-21,23,33H,9,15H2,1-4H3,(H,29,31)/b12-8+,14-13+/t16-,17-,19-,20-,21-,23-,26+,27+,28+/m0/s1 Key: LAJXCUNOQSHRJO-ZYGJITOWSA-N; InChI=1/C28H33NO7/c1-16-9-8-12-19-23-27(4,35-23)17(2)21-20(15-18-10-6-5-7-11-18)29-24(31)28(19,21)36-25(32)34-14-13-26(3,33)22(16)30/h5-8,10-14,16-17,19-21,23,33H,9,15H2,1-4H3,(H,29,31)/b12-8+,14-13+/t16-,17-,19-,20-,21-,23-,26+,27+,28+/m0/s1 Key: LAJXCUNOQSHRJO-ZYGJITOWBM
- SMILES: C[C@H]1C/C=C/[C@H]2[C@H]3[C@](O3)([C@H]([C@@H]4[C@]2(C(=O)N[C@H]4CC5=CC=CC=C5)OC(=O)O/C=C/[C@@](C1=O)(C)O)C)C

Properties
Chemical formula	C_{28}H_{33}NO_{7}
Molar mass	495.572 g·mol^{−1}
Density	1.309 g/ml

Hazards
- Occupational safety and health (OHS/OSH)
Main hazards	Toxic
- GHS labelling
Pictograms	(GHS06: Toxic) (GHS08: Health hazard)
Signal word	Danger
Hazard statements	H300, H310, H330, H361
Precautionary statements	P201, P202, P260, P262, P264, P270, P271, P280, P281, P284, P301+P310, P302+P350, P304+P340, P308+P313, P310, P320, P321, P330, P361, P363, P403+P233, P405, P501
- Except where otherwise noted, data are given for materials in their standard state (at 25 °C [77 °F], 100 kPa). verify (what is ?) Infobox references

Cytochalasin E, a member of the cytochalasin group, is an inhibitor of actin polymerization in blood platelets. It inhibits angiogenesis and tumor growth. Unlike cytochalasin A and cytochalasin B, it does not inhibit glucose transport. Cytochalasin E, however, was noted to decrease glucose absorption in mice around the intestinal tissues by increasing the Km needed for glucose to reach the Vmax, which meant that a higher concentration of glucose was required in its presence to attain Vmax. Since Vmax remained the same according to another study, it is evident that CE is indeed a competitive inhibitor at the intestinal receptor sites for glucose.

Because of its antiangiogenic effect, cytochalasin E is a potential drug for age-related macular degeneration, a kind of blindness caused by an abnormal proliferation of blood vessels in the eye.

Cytochalasin E was found to be a potent and selective inhibitor of bovine capillary endothelial (BCE) cell proliferation. Cytochalasin E differs from other cytochalasin molecules by having an epoxide, which is required for specificity and potency. Cytochalasin E is a potent antiangiogenic agent that may be useful for treatments of cancer and other pathologic angiogenesis. Cytochalasin E was also found to inhibit autophagy, a process vital in recycling dysfunctional cells and cellular components. Cancer cells thus favor autophagy due to its role in countering metabolic stresses induced by anti-cancer drugs such as bortezomib in order to regenerate healthier cancer cells for continued proliferation and growth. In a study, it was confirmed that when CE was used, fusion of autophagosomes with lysozyme was inhibited and so cell death due to bortezomib, a proteasome inhibitor, was amplified as unnecessary proteins would continue to build up inside cancer cells unable to be further recycled through autophagy, leading to apoptosis.

== External pages ==
Cytochalasin E from Fermentek
Cytochalasin E from Cayman Chemical
