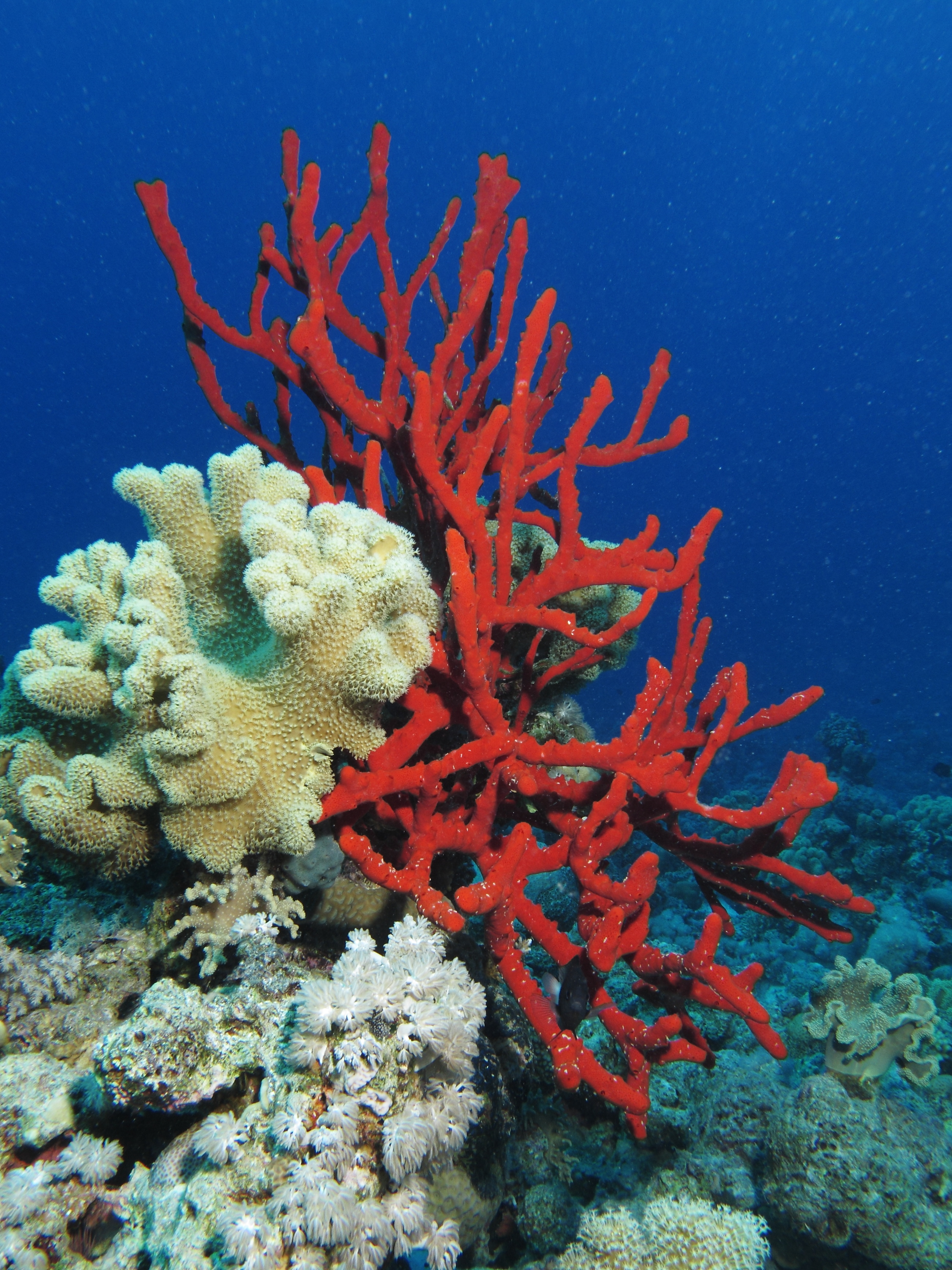
- Red branches of Negombata magnifica

Scientific classification
- Domain: Eukaryota
- Kingdom: Animalia
- Phylum: Porifera
- Class: Demospongiae
- Order: Poecilosclerida
- Family: Podospongiidae
- Genus: Negombata
- Species: N. magnifica

Binomial name
- Negombata magnifica (Keller, 1889)

Synonyms
- Latrunculia magnifica Keller, 1889

= Negombata magnifica =

Toxic finger-sponge

Species of sponge

Negombata magnifica, commonly known as toxic finger-sponge, is a species of sponge found from the Red Sea and the Indian Ocean. Its reddish-brown narrow crooked branches can grow up to 70 centimetres (28 in). Negombata magnifica is extremely toxic because of the toxin latrunculin.

Negombata magnifica lives on shallow coral reefs in the northern waters of the Red Sea . Unlike many other species of sponges that live in abundance in these waters, preferring to grow between corals and rocks, or under them, Negombata magnifica grows in sight. The local fish won't touch it so it doesn't get damaged. When touched, it releases a strongly smelling, reddish juice, which instantaneously makes all the fish flee away.

Negombata magnifica is grown artificially to harvest latrunculin.
