= GalP (protein) =

The galactose permease or GalP found in Escherichia coli is an integral membrane protein involved in the transport of monosaccharides, primarily hexoses, for utilization by E. coli in glycolysis and other metabolic and catabolic pathways (3,4). It is a member of the Major Facilitator Super Family (MFS) and is homologue of the human GLUT1 transporter (4). Below you will find descriptions of the structure, specificity, effects on homeostasis, expression, and regulation of GalP along with examples of several of its homologues.

== Structure ==
Galactose Permease (GalP), is a member of the Major Facilitator Super Family (MFS) and therefore has structural similarities to the other members of this super family such as GLUT1 (4). All members of the MFS have 12 membrane spanning alpha(α)-helices with both the C- and N-termini located on the cytoplasmic side of the membrane (4). Figure 1a (3) depicts how the 12 helices are divided into two halves, that are pseudo-symmetric, of 6 helices which are attached by a long hydrophilic cytoplasmic loop between helix 6 and helix 7 (2,3,4). These two halves come together to form a pore for substrate transport, in GalP, the substrates are primarily galactose, glucose, and H+. GalP monomers have a pore of approximately 10Å in diameter, which is consistent with the pore sizes found in other members of the MFS, between 10-15Å (4). GalP has been found as an oligomer formed by a homotrimer of GalP monomers that exhibits p3 or 3-fold rotational symmetry (Figure 1b-c) (4). GalP is the first member of the MFS that has been found as a trimer and to be biologically active in its trimeric form; it is thought that the GalP oligomer is formed for stability (4).

== Specificity ==
GalP is a monosaccharide transporter that uses a chemiosmotic mechanism to transport its substrates into the cytoplasm of E. coli (1). Glucose, galactose and other hexoses are transported by GalP by the use of the proton gradient produced by the electron transport chain and reversible ATPase (1). GalP can bind specifically to the hexoses with preferential binding of galactose and glucose through the pores in each monomer (2,3). It transports these sugars at faster rates with a proton gradient but can still transport them in a leaky fashion without a proton gradient present (4). As stated before GalP shares similarities with GLUT1 and other members of the MFS and like GLUT1, GalP can be inhibited by the antibiotics cytochalasin B and forskolin (Figure 1a) (3), which competitively bind to the pore blocking sugar transport into the cell (2,3,4). Forskolin is a structural homologue of D-galactose (Figure 1a) (3) and therefore can bind with a similar affinity to the transporter. Cytochalasin B may bind to an asparagine residue (Asn394) in the pore, blocking saccharide uptake, which is also found in the GLUT1 transporter (2,3). GalP can transport lactose or fructose but with low affinity, only allowing these sugars to "leak" across the membrane when glucose, galactose, or other hexoses aren't present for transport (4).

== Homeostasis ==
The GalP symporter links galactose and proton import, using the favorable proton concentration gradient to move galactose against its concentration gradient. However, this mechanism, if in isolation, would result in acidification of the cytoplasm and cessation of galactose import(14). To prevent this, E. coli utilizes ion pumps designed to raise intracellular pH (13,14). During electron transport (a key step in ATP production in respiration), energy harnessed from electrons is used to pump protons into the periplasmic space to build a proton motive force. Primary proton pumps, responsible for pumping protons out of the cytoplasm, can be active without the synthesis of ATP and are the primary mechanism through which protons are exported (13,14). Coupling galactose/proton import with proton export would maintain pH homeostasis. As protons are charged molecules, their import or export could disrupt the membrane potential of the cell (14). However, simultaneous import and export of protons would result in no change in the net charge of the cell, thus no net change in membrane potential.

== Regulation/Expression ==
The GalP/H+ symporter is the galactose permease from the galP gene of the Escherichia coli genome. Galactose is an alternate carbon source to the preferable glucose . The cAMP/CRP catabolite repression regulator is most likely involved in the regulation of GalP expression (Figure 2) (9). The two proteins responsible for inhibiting transcription from the gal regulon are GalR and GalS (Figure 4) (11). GalR and GalS have very similar primary structure sequences, and have the same binding sites on the operator (11). In the presence of D-galactose, GalR and GalS are inhibited since they are repressors (5, 11). However, when GalP is not required (i.e. when glucose is available), GalR/GalS will bind the promoter operator site thus blocking transcription and preventing cAMP-CRP activation (11). GalS is seen to bind only in the presence of GalR, so both of these proteins are required for repression (11). cAMP is what modulates CRP at the promoter. The cAMP-CRP complex activates the gal regulon and is responsible for upregulation of GalP (Figure 2) (9,11). GalP is also repressed in the presence of glucose since the cell will prefer glucose over galactose (7).

There is also a study on the involvement of NagC in regulation, a protein from the nagC gene that is responsible for N-acetylglucosamine repression (5). This study suspects that NagC cooperates with GalR and GalS by binding to a single-high affinity site upstream of the galP promoter as well in order to suppress gal regulon transcription (5).

== Other Bacteria Symporters ==
Several other symporters have been identified in E. coli and in other bacteria. E. coli has a well-studied GltS glutamate/Na+ symporter that aids in the uptake of glutamate into the cell along with an influx of sodium ions. It also has a serine-threonine symporter, SstT, that also uses an influx of sodium ions for solute uptake.

A Na+/glucose symporter (SglT) has been identified in Vibrio parahaemolyticus (10). Sodium ions induced the cells’ uptake of glucose in a study of phosphotransferase-system (PTS) mutants (10). Clostridioides difficile has a symporter homologous to that of the V. parahaemolyticus SglT (6). A citrate/Na+ symporter, CitS, seems to be common between Vibrio cholerae, Salmonella Typhi, and Klebsiella pneumoniae (6). This symporter uses the influx of sodium ions to bring citrate into the cell, which is an important substrate to have for metabolic processes such as decarboxylation of oxaloacetate (6). A H+/amino acid symporter BrnQ can be found in Lactobacillus delbruckii, and Pseudomonas aeruginosa has the BraB symporter for substrates such as glutamate as well (6).

Solute/ion symporters are very commonly found in bacteria since they are very important. Homeostasis and regulated uptake for metabolic pathways is essential for bacterial survival.

== GLUT-1: A Eukaryotic Homolog ==
GalP is homologous to GLUT-1 found in mammalian cells (12). Both transporters are MFS transporters and possess 29% sequence identity (4). GLUT-1 is a glucose transporter present in most mammalian cells (Figure 5) (12). Its structure is nearly identical to that of GalP – possessing cytoplasmic amino and carboxy termini, twelve membrane spanning α helices, a periplasmic glycosylation site between helices 1 and 2, and a cytoplasmic α-helix loop between helices 6 and 7 (12). GLUT-1 ranges from 45 to 55 kDa; the size variation depends upon the extent of glycosylation (12).

While GLUT-1 is found in most mammalian cells, certain tissue types express this transporter more so than others. GLUT-1 is expressed in high levels on erythrocytes, embryonic cells, fibroblasts, and endothelial cells (12). GLUT-1 is also one of the main transporters involved in transporting glucose across the blood brain barrier (12).

Generally, GLUT-1 acts as a facilitative transporter of glucose, transporter glucose along its concentration gradient. When glucose binds to GLUT-1, it stimulates a conformational change, allowing glucose to be released on the opposite side of the membrane (4,12). GLUT-1 is a bidirectional transporter and possesses glucose binding sites accessible on both the cytoplasmic and extracellular faces (4,12). On the rare occasion that GLUT-1 transports glucose against its concentration gradient, Glut-1 uses an energy source, typically ATP, to move the glucose. Like GalP, GLUT-1 is inhibited via the binding of cytochalasin B and forskolin (12).

== See also ==
- Transmembrane protein
- List of proteins
