= Cytochalasin =

Group of chemical compounds

Cytochalasins are fungal metabolites that have the ability to bind to actin filaments and block polymerization and the elongation of actin. As a result of the inhibition of actin polymerization, cytochalasins can change cellular morphology, inhibit cellular processes such as cell division, and even cause cells to undergo apoptosis. Cytochalasins have the ability to permeate cell membranes, prevent cellular translocation and cause cells to enucleate. Cytochalasins can also have an effect on other aspects of biological processes unrelated to actin polymerization. For example, cytochalasin A and cytochalasin B can also inhibit the transport of monosaccharides across the cell membrane, cytochalasin H has been found to regulate plant growth, cytochalasin D inhibits protein synthesis and cytochalasin E prevents angiogenesis.

== Binding to actin filaments ==
Cytochalasins are known to bind to the barbed, fast growing plus ends of microfilaments, which then blocks both the assembly and disassembly of individual actin monomers from the bound end. Once bound, cytochalasins essentially cap the end of the new actin filament. One cytochalasin will bind to one actin filament. Studies done with cytochalasin D (CD) have found that CD-actin dimers contain ATP-bound actin upon formation. These CD-actin dimers are reduced to CD-actin monomers as a result of ATP hydrolysis. The resulting CD-actin monomer can bind ATP-actin monomer to reform the CD-actin dimer. CD is very effective; only low concentrations (0.2 μM) are needed to prevent membrane ruffling and disrupt treadmilling. The effects of many different cytochalasins on actin filaments were analyzed and higher concentrations (2-20 μM) of CD were found to be needed to remove stress fibers.

In contrast, latrunculin inhibits actin filament polymerization by binding to actin monomers.

== Uses and applications of cytochalasins ==
Actin microfilaments have been widely studied using cytochalasins. Due to their chemical nature, cytochalasins can help researchers understand the importance of actin in various biological processes. The use of cytochalasins has allowed researchers to better understand actin polymerization, cell motility, ruffling, cell division, contraction, and cell stiffness. The use of cytochalasins has been so important to understanding cytoskeletal movement and many other biological processes, researchers have created two synthetic cytochalasins.

Cytochalasin has found practical application in thromboelastometry (TEM) whole blood assays for the assessment of fibrinogen and fibrin polymerization disorders in the FIBTEM assay on ROTEM. This test is based on the principle that cytochalasin D very effectively inhibits platelet function by inhibition of the contractile elements. The platelet inhibition is more effective than when platelets are blocked by GPIIb/IIIa antagonists. In vitro and clinical data indicate that the clot strength in FIBTEM increases in a fibrinogen concentration-dependent manner independent of platelet count. Therefore, fibrinogen deficiency or fibrin polymerization disorders can be rapidly detected.

== Chemical structures ==
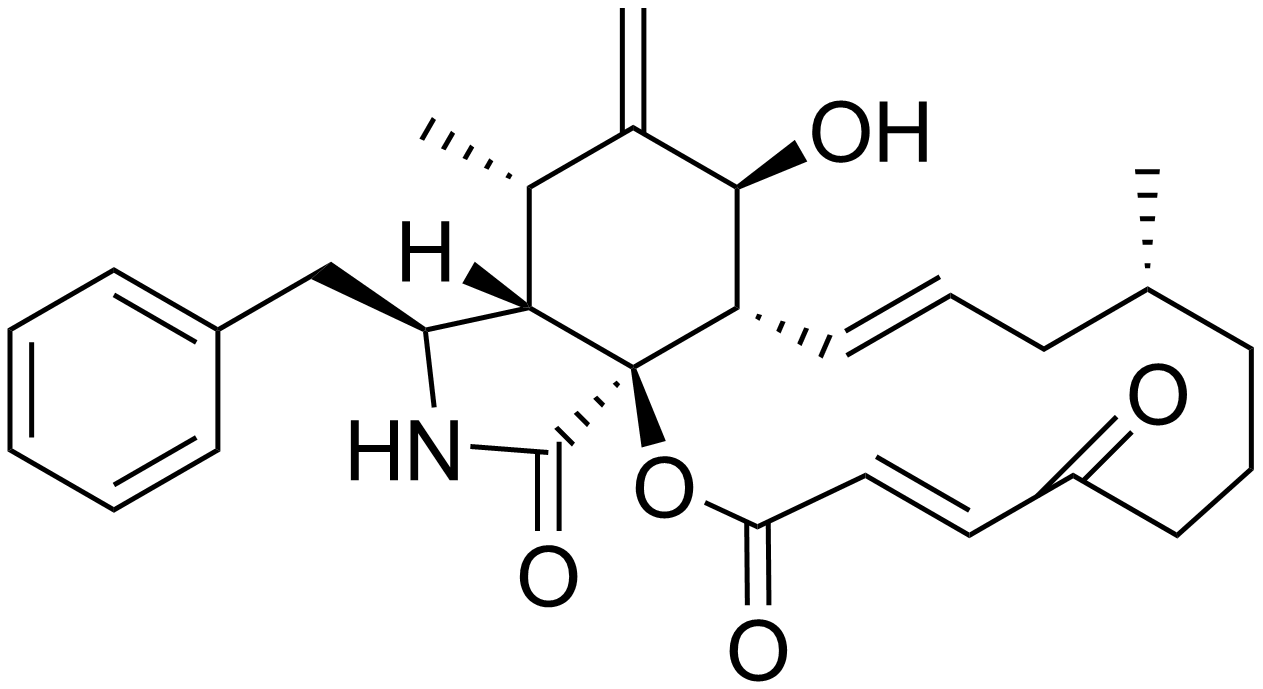
Cytochalasin A

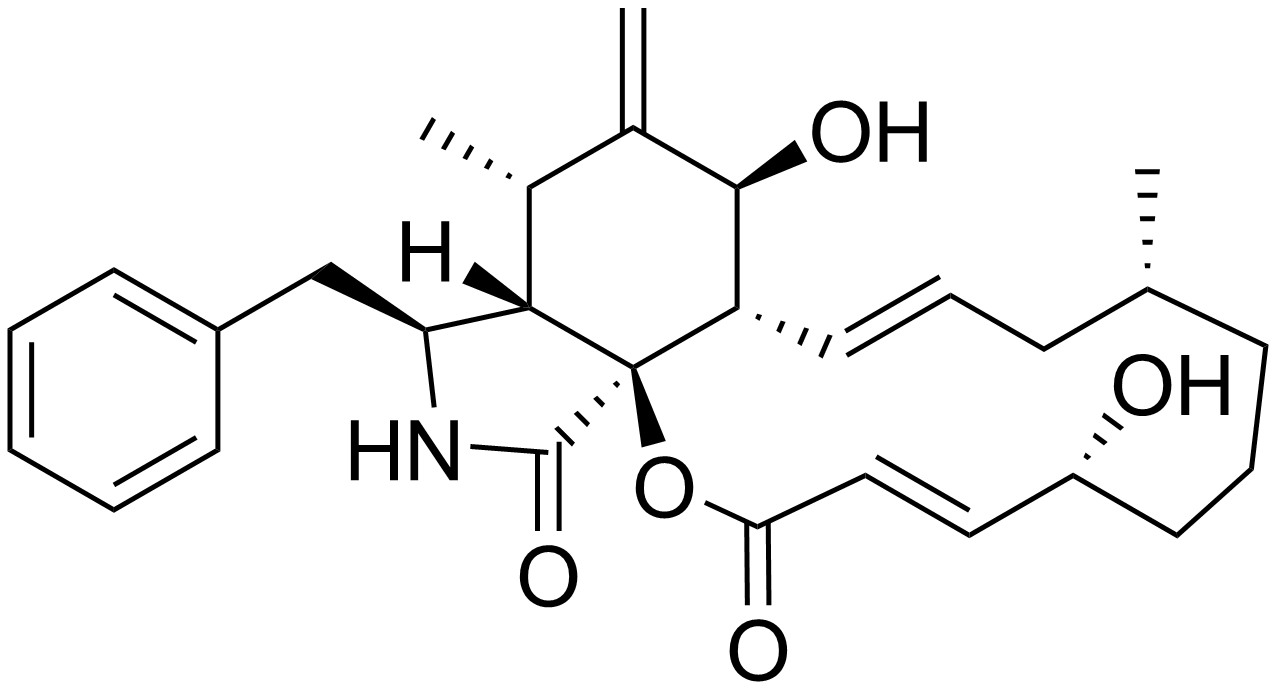
Cytochalasin B

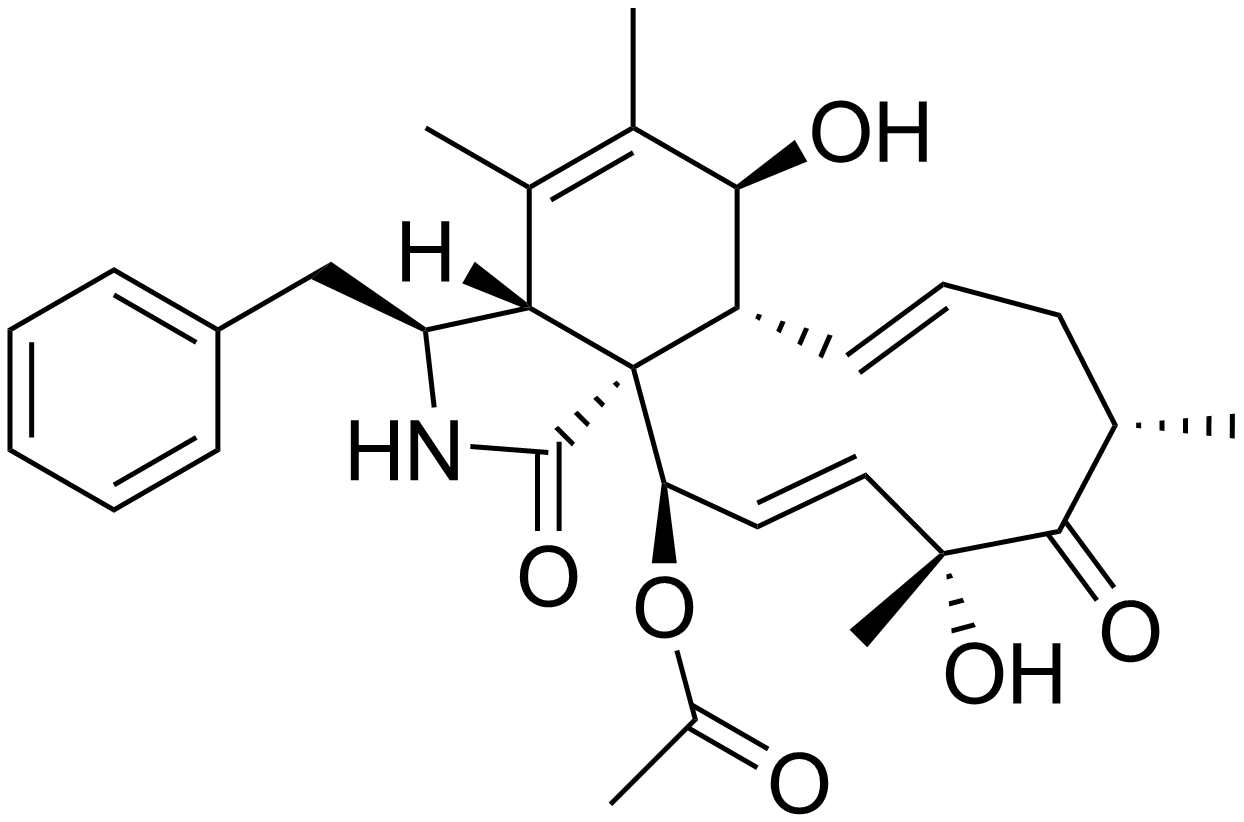
Cytochalasin C

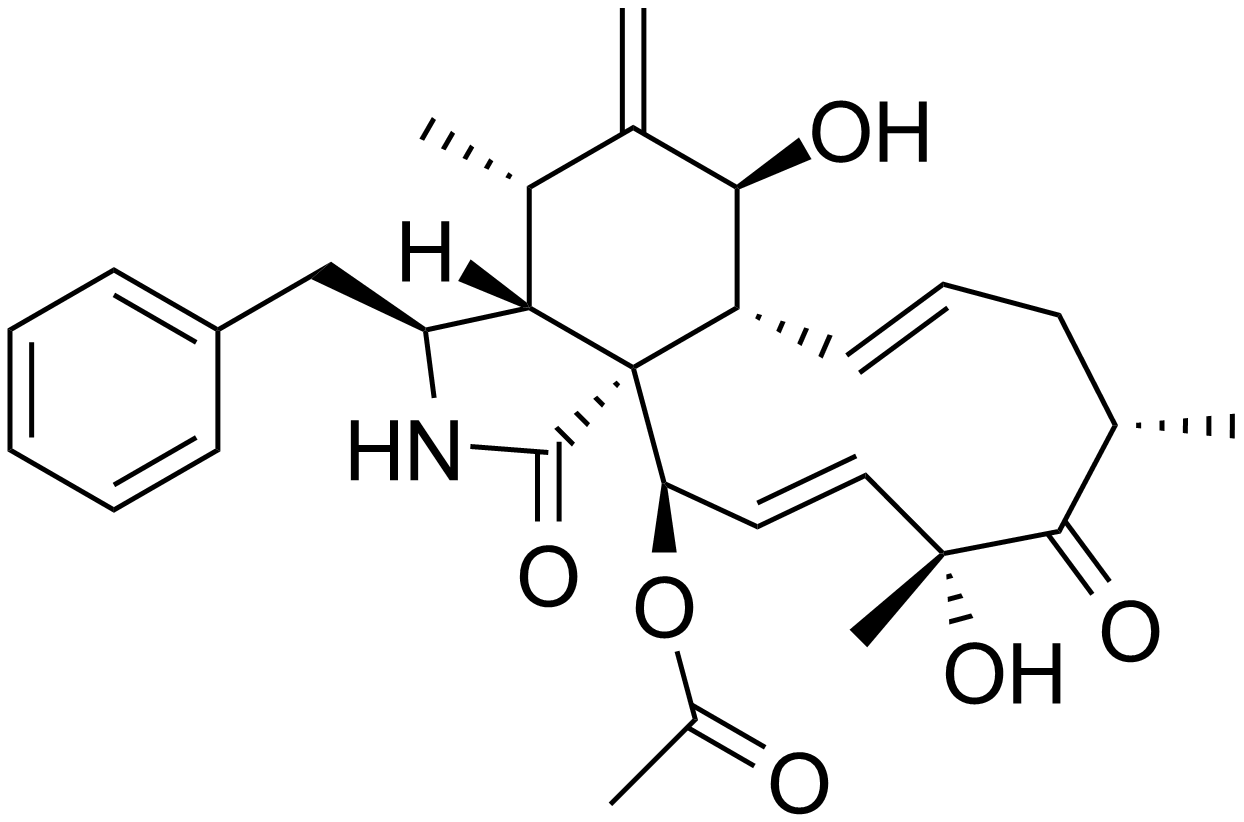
Cytochalasin D

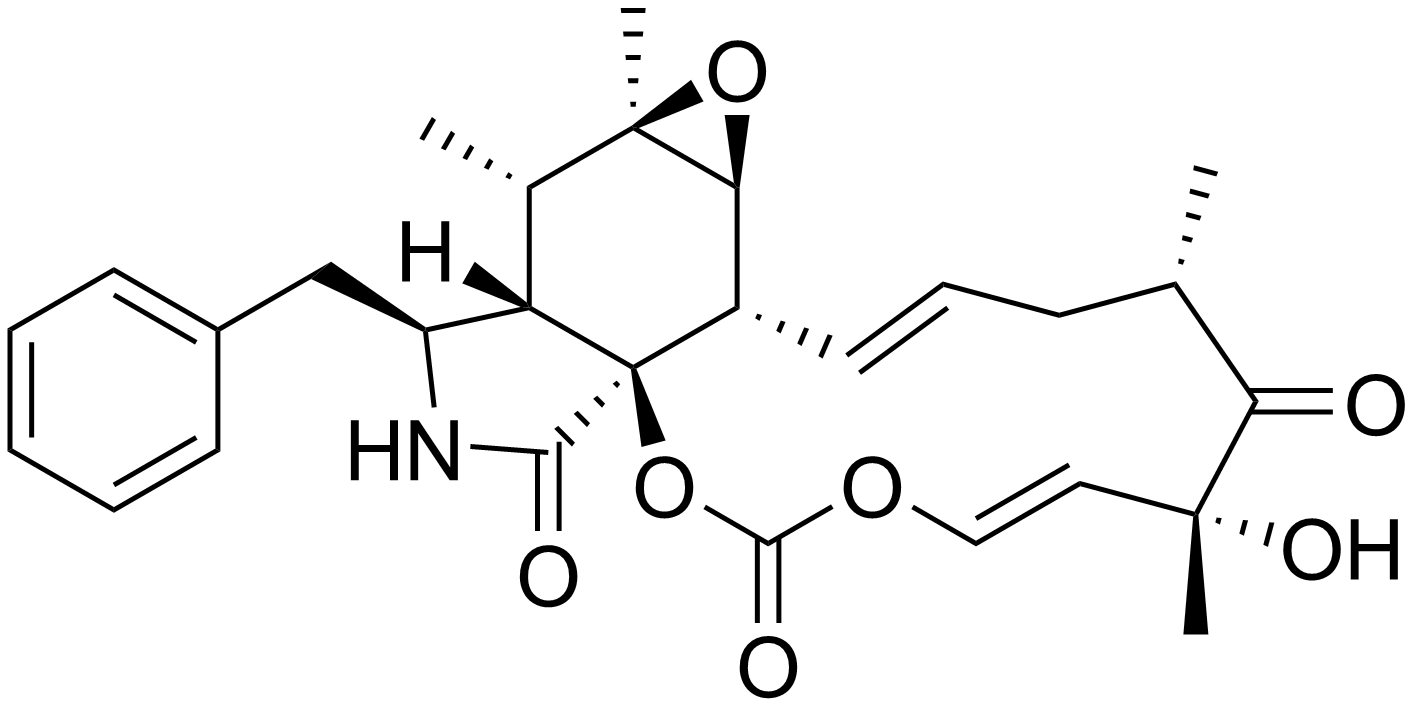
Cytochalasin E

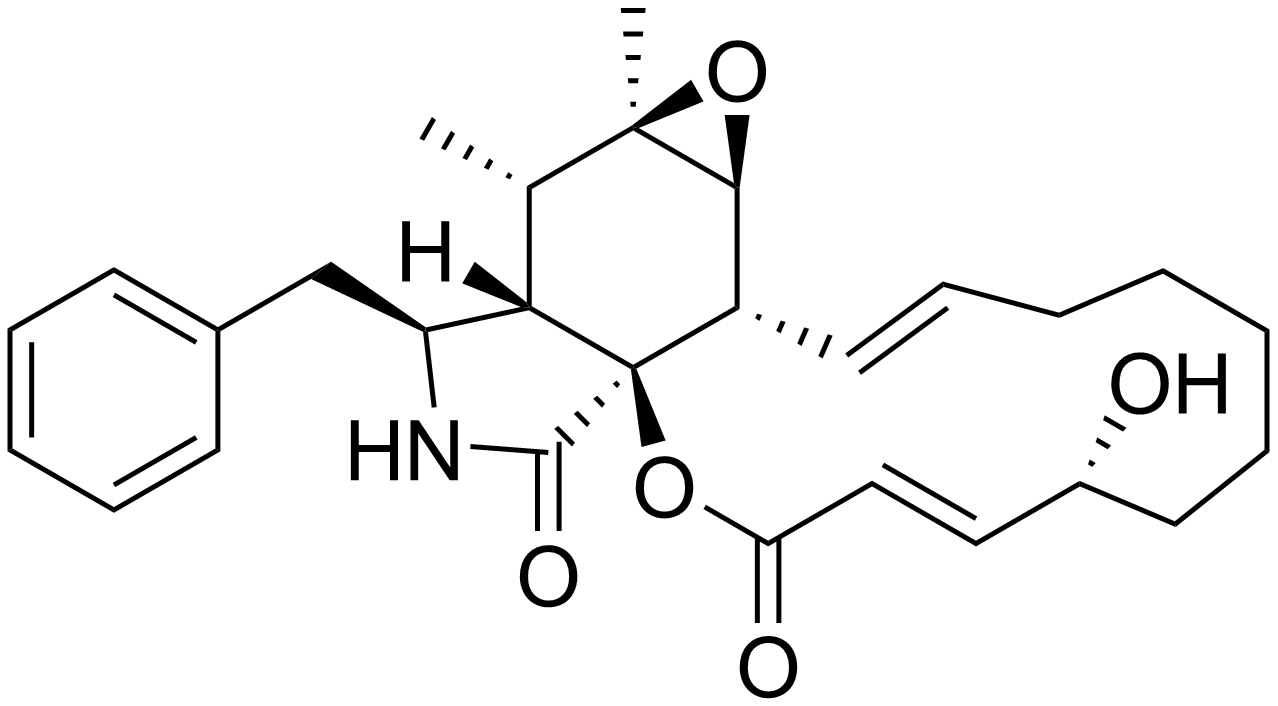
Cytochalasin F

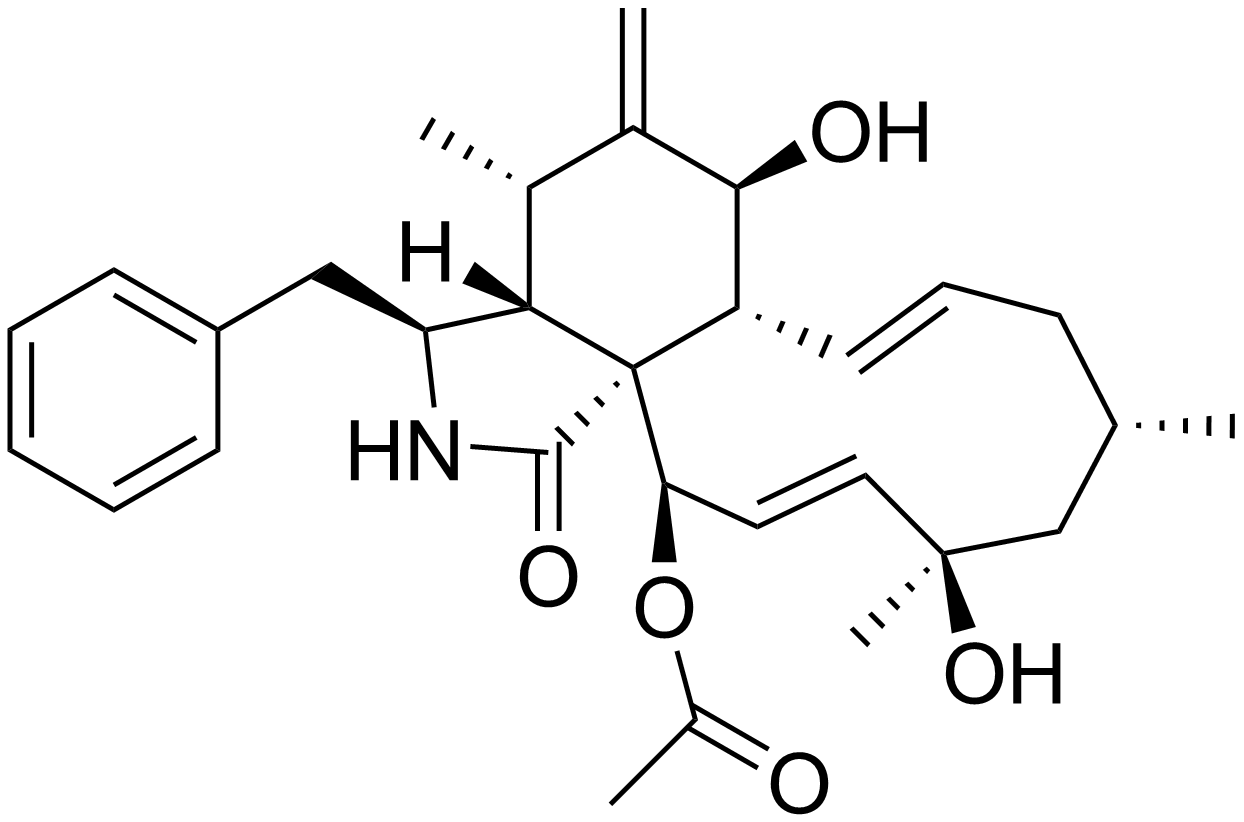
Cytochalasin H

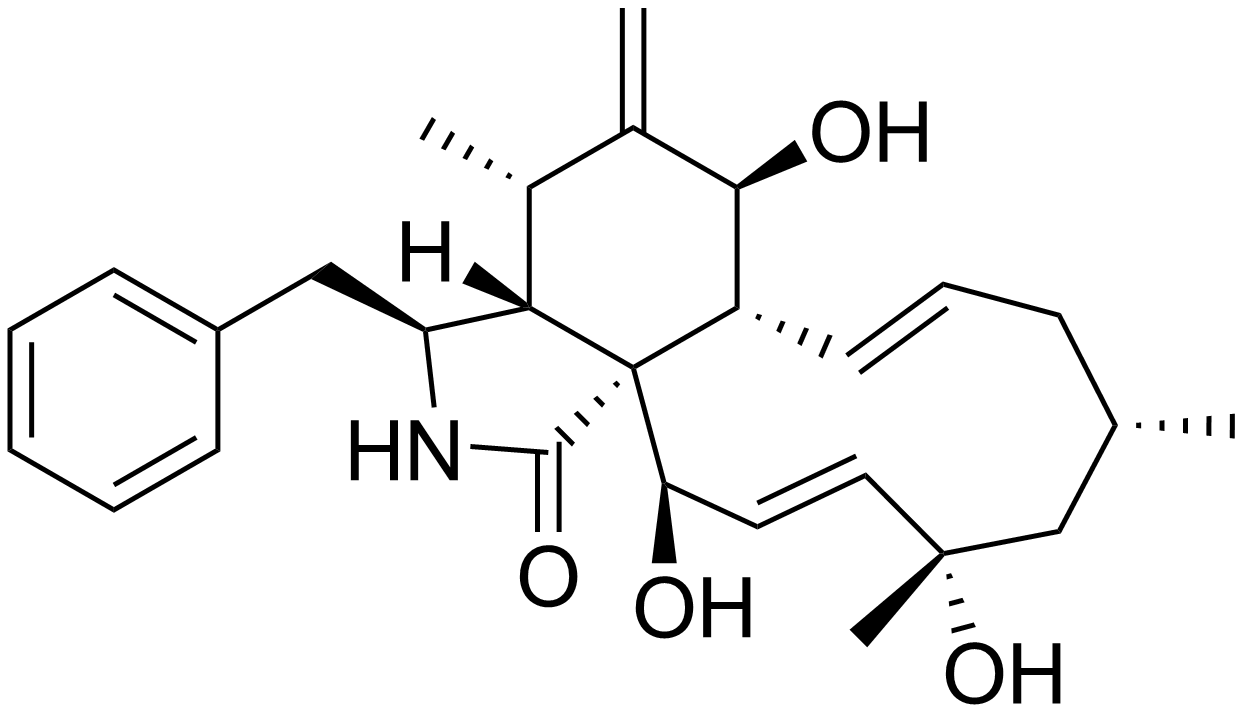
Cytochalasin J

== See also ==
- Cytoskeletal drugs
