= Horizontal transfer of mitochondria =

Movement of whole mitochondria between cells

Horizontal transfer of mitochondria is the movement of whole mitochondria and mitochondrial DNA between cells. Mitochondria from donor cells are transported and incorporated into the endogenous mitochondrial network of recipient cells contributing to changes in the bioenergetics profile and in other functional properties of recipient cells. Horizontal cell-to-cell transfer of mitochondria and mitochondrial genome can occur among mammalian cells in vitro and in vivo. Mitochondrial transfer supports the exogenous replacement of damaged mitochondria, thereby rescuing mitochondrial defects. Stem cells, immortalized cells, or primary cells are usually used as mitochondrial donors in most studies. These cells may transfer mitochondria to surrounding cells in their niche, thus affecting cell differentiation, proliferation, tissue homeostasis, development and ageing.

== Mechanism ==
Horizontal transfer of mitochondria is mediated by actin-rich membrane protrusions named tunneling nanotubes (TNTs). The establishment of a nanotube begins with the formation of a filopodium-like membrane protrusion that retracts after reaching the recipient cell, leaving an ultrafine structure that is separated from the substrate. Chemical inhibitors or mechanical stress impairs the formation of TNTs and reduces mitochondrial exchange. On the other hand, certain types of stress agents such as doxorubicin or ethidium bromide increase TNT formation. Other proposed mechanisms of transfer include membrane microvesicles, cell fusion, dendrites, and mitochondrial extrusion.

== In vitro transfer ==
The first evidence of functional mitochondrial transfer in vitro has been documented between human mesenchymal stem cells (hMSCs) and human lung carcinoma cells. Healthy mitochondria from hMSCs moved to recipient lung carcinoma cells with nonfunctional mitochondria and repaired their function. Intercellular transfer of mitochondria in culture has been documented from MSCs and endothelial cells to breast cancer cell lines, ovarian cancer cell lines or to osteosarcoma cell line. Mitochondrial transfer can occur also between cancer cells such as mesothelioma and laryngeal carcinoma cells. Non-tumor cells such as human renal epithelial cells, human retinal pigment epithelial cells or human monocyte-derived macrophages have been shown to transfer their mitochondria as well. All these data suggest that this phenomenon, regardless of the exact mechanisms involved, may be a fundamental physiological process well worthwhile exploring in a whole organism setting.

== In vivo transfer ==
One of the first evidences of in vivo horizontal mitochondrial gene transfer was found in a transmissible canine venereal tumor (CTVT), highly adapted cancer transmitted during mating of feral dogs. Phylogenetic analyses of mitochondrial sequences revealed that CTVT cells periodically acquire mitochondria from its host and ensure overcoming high mutation rate that would promote the accumulation of deleterious mutations in their own mitochondria and long-term survival. Transfer of intact mitochondria can contribute to tissue repair in vivo. Bone marrow-derived stem cells (BMSCs) injected into mice with acute lung injury transfer their mitochondria to lung alveoli cells and protect them against injury. Overexpression of Miro1, a protein connecting mitochondria to cytoskeletal motor proteins, leads to enhanced transfer of mitochondria from MSCs into stressed epithelial cells via TNTs in mice. In vivo horizontal transfer of mitochondria can occur in cancer cells which upon mitochondrial damage acquire mtDNA from surrounding donor healthy cells. This process restores transcription and translation of mtDNA-encoded genes as well as respiration.

Injured neurons cannot be quickly replaced after ischemia without transfer of mitochondria from other cells. Transfer of functional mitochondria from astrocytes to ischemically-damaged neurons has been shown to promote recovery in the brain. Stem cells are also a source of mitochondria for ischemic brain cells.

== Cancer ==
Mitochondrial transfer occurs between tumor cells and other cells of the tumor microenvironment. For example, highly glycolytic cancer-associated fibroblasts donate their disposable mitochondria to adjacent prostate cancer cells enhancing the respiratory capacity of the cancer cells. Mitochondrial transfer in cancer cells contributes to chemotherapy resistance. A 2026 study reported that tumor cells in mice were able to compel immune cells to release their mitochondria so that the tumor cell could absorb them. This strengthened the tumor cells and expressed genes linked to the type 1 interferon pathway, helping them avoid the immune system. The transfer also weakened the immune cells.
