= Engleromyces =

Scientific classification
- Domain: Eukaryota
- Kingdom: Fungi
- Division: Ascomycota
- Class: Sordariomycetes
- Order: Xylariales
- Family: Xylariaceae
- Genus: Engleromyces; P.Henn. (1900)

Type species
- Engleromyces goetzei P.Henn. (1900)

Species
- E. goetzei E. sinensis

Synonyms
- Colletomanginia Har. & Pat. (1906); Stromne Clem. (1909); Cerillum Clem. (1931)

Genus of fungi

Engleromyces is a genus of fungi in the family Xylariaceae. The genus contains two species, the type Engleromyces goetzei (found in Africa and Asia) and E. sinensis (found in China), described as new in 2010. The genus was circumscribed in Bot. Jahrb. Syst. Vol.28 on page 327 in 1900 by German mycologist Paul Christoph Hennings.

The genus name of Engleromyces is in honour of Heinrich Gustav Adolf Engler (1844 – 1930), who was a German botanist. He is notable for his work on plant taxonomy and phytogeography.
