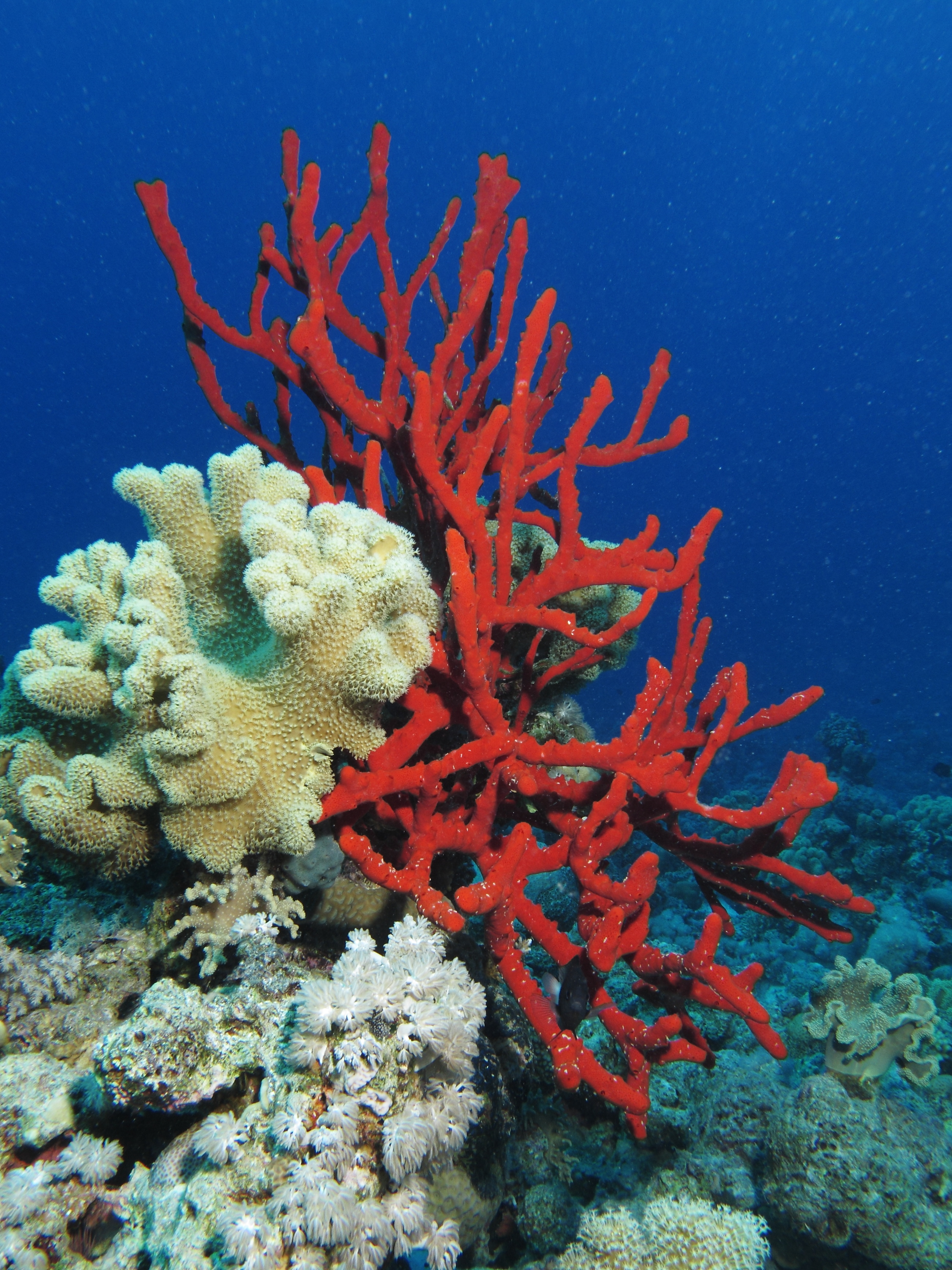
- Negombata magnifica

Scientific classification
- Kingdom: Animalia
- Phylum: Porifera
- Class: Demospongiae
- Order: Poecilosclerida
- Family: Podospongiidae de Laubenfels, 1936

= Podospongiidae =

Family of sponges

Podospongiidae is a family of sponges in the order Poecilosclerida.

== Taxonomy ==
- Diacarnus Burton, 1934
- Diplopodospongia Sim-Smith & Kelly, 2011
- Negombata de Laubenfels, 1936
- Neopodospongia Sim-Smith & Kelly, 2011
- Podospongia du Bocage, 1869
- Sceptrintus Topsent, 1898
- Sigmosceptrella Dendy, 1922
