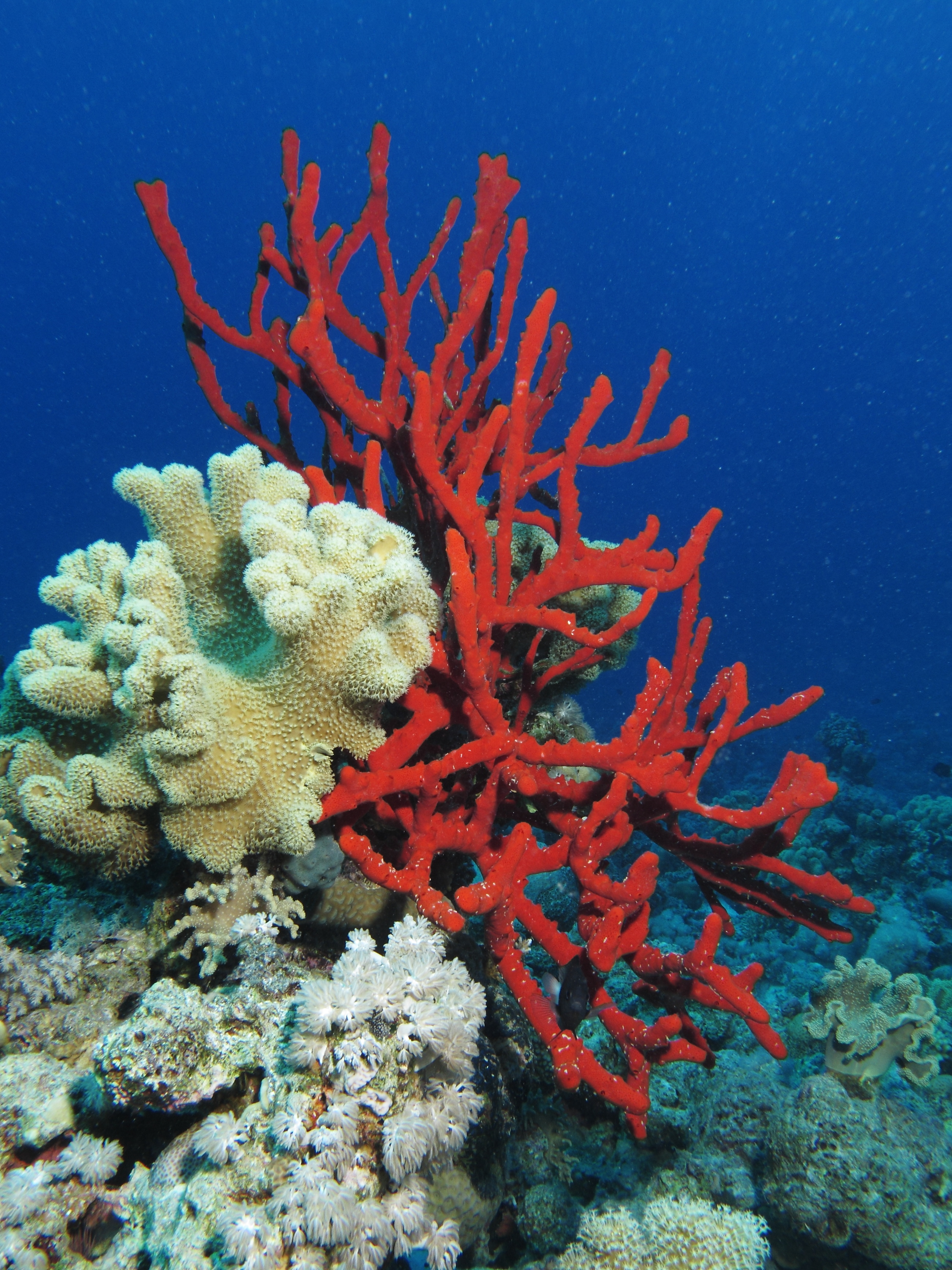
- Negombata magnifica

Scientific classification
- Kingdom: Animalia
- Phylum: Porifera
- Class: Demospongiae
- Order: Poecilosclerida
- Family: Podospongiidae
- Genus: Negombata de Laubenfels, 1936

= Negombata =

Genus of sponges

Negombata is a genus of sponges in the family Podospongiidae.

== Species ==
- Negombata corticata Carter, 1879
- Negombata kenyensis Pulitzer-Finali, 1993
- Negombata magnifica Keller, 1889
