= Latrunculin =

Latrunculin A
Latrunculin B

Identifiers
CAS Number	A: 76343-93-6; B: 76343-94-7
3D model (JSmol)	A: Interactive image; B: Interactive image
ChEBI	A: CHEBI:69136; B: CHEBI:49703
ChEMBL	ChEMBL411879; A: ChEMBL404116
ChemSpider	A: 393069; B: 10192733
DrugBank	A: DB02621; B: DB08080
PubChem CID	A: 445420; B: 6436219
UNII	A: SRQ9WWM084; B: LW7U308U7U
CompTox Dashboard (EPA)	A: DTXSID90893488
- InChI: A: InChI=1S/C22H31NO5S/c1-15-7-5-3-4-6-8-16(2)11-20(24)27-18-12-17(10-9-15)28-22(26,13-18)19-14-29-21(25)23-19/h3-5,7,11,15,17-19,26H,6,8-10,12-14H2,1-2H3,(H,23,25)/b4-3+,7-5-,16-11-/t15-,17-,18-,19+,22-/m1/s1 Key: DDVBPZROPPMBLW-IZGXTMSKSA-N; B: InChI=1S/C20H29NO5S/c1-13-5-3-4-6-14(2)9-18(22)25-16-10-15(8-7-13)26-20(24,11-16)17-12-27-19(23)21-17/h3,5,9,13,15-17,24H,4,6-8,10-12H2,1-2H3,(H,21,23)/b5-3-,14-9-/t13-,15-,16-,17+,20-/m1/s1 Key: NSHPHXHGRHSMIK-JRIKCGFMSA-N
- SMILES: A: C[C@H]/1CC[C@@H]2C[C@H](C[C@@](O2)([C@@H]3CSC(=O)N3)O)OC(=O)/C=C(\CC/C=C/C=C1)/C; B: C[C@H]/1CC[C@@H]2C[C@H](C[C@@](O2)([C@@H]3CSC(=O)N3)O)OC(=O)/C=C(\CC/C=C1)/C
- Except where otherwise noted, data are given for materials in their standard state (at 25 °C [77 °F], 100 kPa). Infobox references

The latrunculins are a family of natural products and toxins produced by certain sponges, including genus Latrunculia and Negombata, whence the name is derived. It binds actin monomers near the nucleotide binding cleft with 1:1 stoichiometry and prevents them from polymerizing. Administered in vivo, this effect results in disruption of the actin filaments of the cytoskeleton, and allows visualization of the corresponding changes made to the cellular processes. This property is similar to that of cytochalasin, but has a narrow effective concentration range. Latrunculin has been used to great effect in the discovery of cadherin distribution regulation and has potential medical applications. Latrunculin A, a type of the toxin, was found to be able to make reversible morphological changes to mammalian cells by disrupting the actin network.

Latrunculin A:

Molecular Formula:	C_{22}H_{31}NO_{5}S
Molecular Weight:	421.552 g/mol

Target and functions

Gelsolin - Latrunculin A causes end- blocking; this protein binds to the barbed sides of the actin filaments which accelerates nucleation. This calcium-regulated protein also plays a role in assembly and disassembly of cilia which plays a crucial role in handedness.

Latrunculin B:

Molecular Formula:	C_{20}H_{29}NO_{5}S^{[4]}
Molecular Weight:	395.514 g/mol

Target and Function

Actin- Latrunculin B makes up the structure of the actin fibers.

Protein spire homolog 2- needed for cell division, vesicle transport within the actin filament and is essential for the formation of the cleavage formation during cell division^{[4]}.

== History ==
Latrunculin is a toxin that is produced by sponges. The red-coloured Latrunculia Magnifica Keller is an abundant sponge in the Gulf of Aqaba and the Gulf of Suez in the red sea, where it lives at a depth of 6–30 meters. The toxin was discovered around 1970. Researchers observed that the red-coloured sponges, Latrunculia Magnifica Keller, were never damaged or eaten by fishes, while others were. Furthermore, when researchers squeezed the sponges in the sea, they observed that a red fluid came out. Fishes nearby immediately fled the surrounding area when the sponge secreted the fluid. These were the first indications that these sponges produced a toxin. Later this hypothesis was confirmed by squeezing the sponge in an aquarium with fish, whereupon the fish showed a loss of balance and severe bleeding, dying within only 4–6 minutes. Similar effects were observed when the toxin was injected in mice.

Latrunculin makes up to 0.35% of the dry weight of the sponge. There are two main forms of the toxin, A and B. Latrunculin A is only present in sponges which live in the Gulf of Suez while latrunculin B only exist in sponges in the Gulf of Aqaba. Why this is the case is still under investigation.

== Structure ==
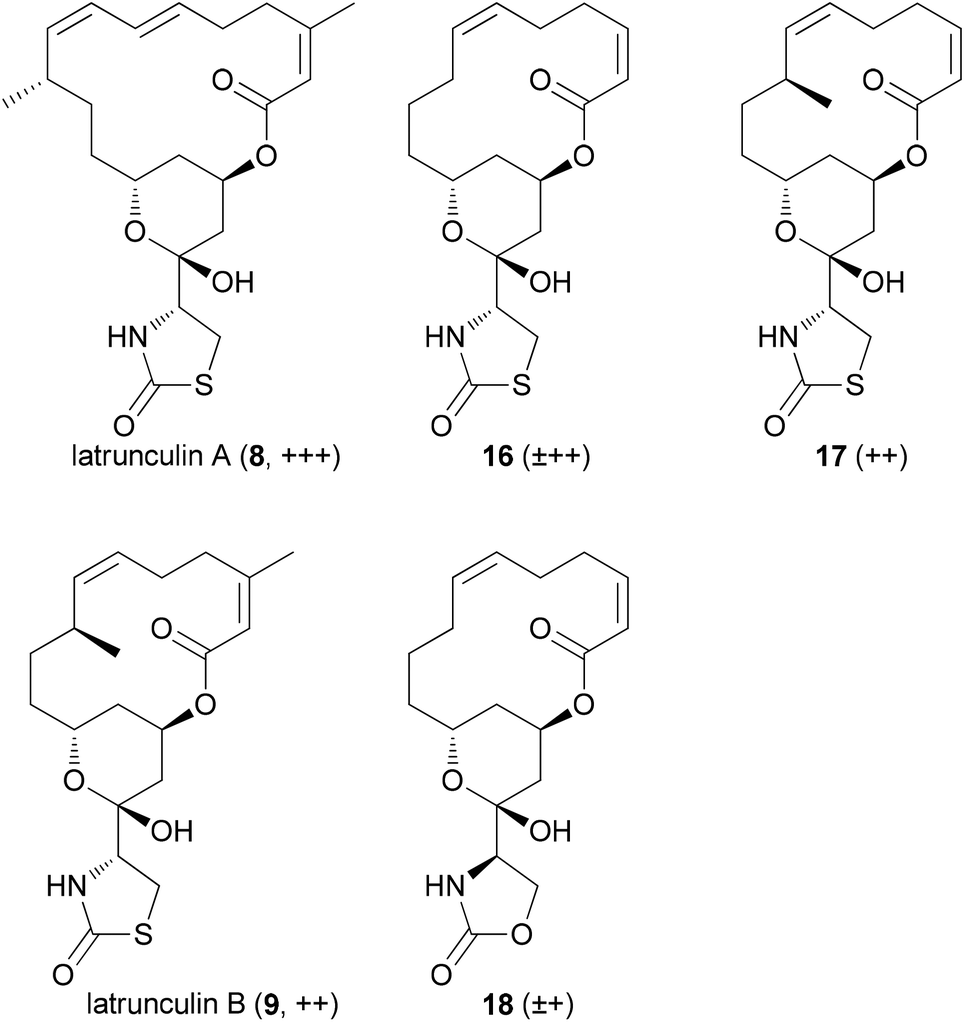
Figure 2 relative activity of Latrunculin analogues The micro filament disrupting activity (at 10 μM effective concentration). Abbreviations: ± weak effect, + significant effect, ++ strong effect, +++ very strong effect (less than 20% viable cells).

There are several isomers of latrunculin, A, B, C, D, G, H, M, S and T. The most common structures are latrunculin A and B. Their formulas are respectively C_{22}H_{31}NO_{5}S and C_{20}H_{29}NO_{5}S. The macrolactone ring on top that contains double bonds is a structural feature of the latrunculin molecules. The side chain contains an acylthiazolidinone substitute. Besides these natural occurring forms, scientist have made synthetic forms with different toxic strengths. Figure 2 shows some of these forms with their relative ability to disrupt microfilament activity. Semisynthetic forms that contained N-alkylated derivates were inactive.

== Mechanism of action ==
Latrunculin A and latrunculin B affect polymerization of actin. Latrunculin binds actin monomers near the nucleotide binding cleft with 1:1 stoichiometry and prevents them from polymerizing. The nucleotide monomers are prevented from dissociation from the nucleotide binding cleft, thus preventing polymerizing.

Experimental evidence shows that latruculin-A is biologically active in the solvent DMSO, but not in aqueous solutions, as demonstrated in cell culture and in brain tissue probably due to cellular permeation.

When actin is impaired due to latrunculin, Shiga toxins have a better chance of infiltrating the intestinal epithelial monolayer in E. coli, which may cause a higher chance of generating gastrointestinal illnesses.

It seems that actin monomers are more sensitive to bind latrunculin A than to bind Latrunculin B. In other words, latrunculin A is a more potent toxin. Latrunculin B is inactivated faster than latrunculin A.

The prevention of polymerizing of the actin filaments causes reversible changes in the morphology of mammalian cells. Latranculin interferes with the structure of the cytoskeleton in rats.

After latrunculin B exposure, mouse fibroblasts grow bigger and PtK2 kidney cells from a potoroo stem produced long, branched extensions. The extensions seem to be an accumulation of actin monomers.

== Metabolism ==
Yeast cells in absence of the proteins osh3 or osh5 demonstrated hypersensitivity to latrunculin B. The osh proteins are homologous to OSBP generated enzymes that appear in mammals, indicating that these might play a role in the toxicokinetics of latrunculins.

Yeast mutants that are resistant to latrunculin show a mutation, D157E, that initiates a hydrogen bond with latrunculin. Other yeast mutants adjust the binding site, thus making it resistant to latrunculin.

No research has been done to figure out how the biotransformation of latrunculin works in eukaryotic cells. However, research suggests that it is the unaltered form of latrunculin that causes toxic effects.

== Toxicity ==
As latrunculin inhibits actin polymerization and actomyosin contractile ability, exposure to latrunculin may result in cellular relaxation, expansion of drainage tissues and decreased outflow resistance in e.g. the trabecular meshwork.

=== Plant ===
Latrunculin B causes marked and dose-dependent reductions in pollen germination frequency and pollen tube growth rate.

Adding latrunculin B to solutions of pollen F-actin resulted in a rapid decrease in the total amount of polymer, with the extent of depolymerization increasing with the concentration of the toxin. The concentration of latrunculin B required for half-maximal inhibition of pollen germination is 40 to 50 nM. In contrast, pollen tube extension is much more sensitive, requiring only 5 to 7 nM LATB for half-maximal inhibition. The disruption of germination and pollen tube growth by latrunculin B is partially reversible at low concentrations. (<30 nM).

=== Animal ===
Squeezing Latrunculia magnifica into aquarium with fishes causes their almost immediate agitation, followed by hemorrhage, loss of balance and death in 4–6 minutes.

Latrunculin A has been used as acrosome reaction inhibitor of guinea pig in laboratory conditions.

=== Human ===
Lat-A induces reduction of actomyosin contractility. This is associated with trabecular meshwork porous expansion without evidence of reduced structural extracellular matrix protein expression or cellular viability. In high doses, latrunculin can induce acute cell injury and programmed cell death through activating the caspase-3/7 pathway.

=== Lethal doses ===
TDLO - Lowest Published Toxic Dose

LD50 – median Lethal Dose

Indicator	Species	Dose
Oral TDLO	Man	1,14 ml/kg, 650 mg/kg
Oral LD50	Rat	7,06 mg/kg
Oral LD50	Mouse	3,45 g/kg, 10,5 ml/kg
Oral LD50	Rabbit	6,30 mg/kg
Inhalation LC50	Rat	6h: 5,900 mg/m3 10h: 20,000 ppm
Inhalation LCLO	Mouse	7h: 29,300 ppm
Inhalation TCLO	Human	20m: 2,500 mg/m3 30m: 1,800 ppm
Irritation eyes	Rabbit	24h: 500 mg
Irritation skin	Rabbit	24h: 20 mg

== Applications ==
In nature, latrunculins are used by the sponges themselves as a defense mechanism, and for the same purpose are also sequestered by certain nudibranchs.

Latrunculins are produced for fundamental research and have potential medical applications as latrunculins and their derivatives show antiangionic, antiproliferative, antimicrobial and antimetastatic activities.

=== Defense mechanism ===
Like many other sessile organisms, sponges are rich of secondary metabolites with toxic properties and most of them, including Latrunculin, have a defense role against predators, competitors and epibionts.

The sponges themselves are not damaged by latrunculin. As a measure against self-toxination, they keep the latrunculin in membrane-bound vacuoles, that also function as secretory and storage vesicles. These vacuoles are free of actin and prevent the latrunculin from entering the cytosol where it would damage actin. After production in the choanocytes, the latrunculin is transferred via the archeocytes to the vulnerable areas of the sponges where defense is needed, such as injured or regenerating sites.

=== Sequestering by nudibranchs ===
Sea slugs of the genus Chromodoris sequester different toxics from the sponges that they eat as defensive metabolites, including latrunculin. They selectively transfer and store latrunculin in the sites of the mantle that are most exposed to potential predators. It is thought that the digestive system of the nudibranchs plays an important role in the detoxification.

In 2015, the discovery that five closely related sea slugs of the genus Chromodoris all use latrunculin as defense, indicates that the toxic might be used via Müllerian mimicry.
