= Demecolcine =

Chemical compound

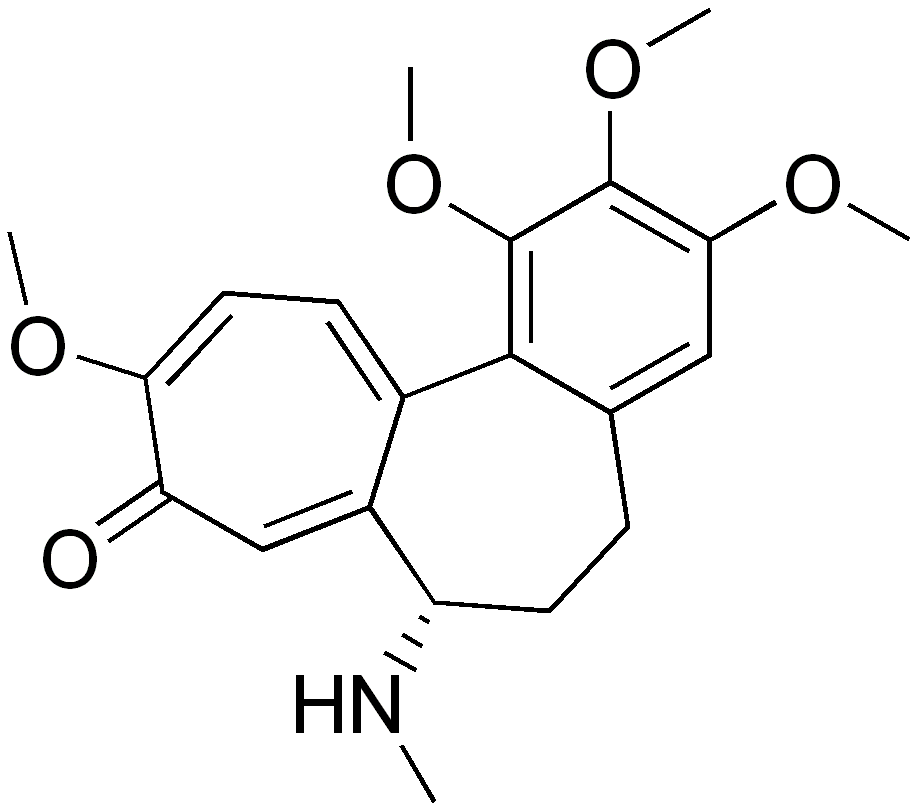

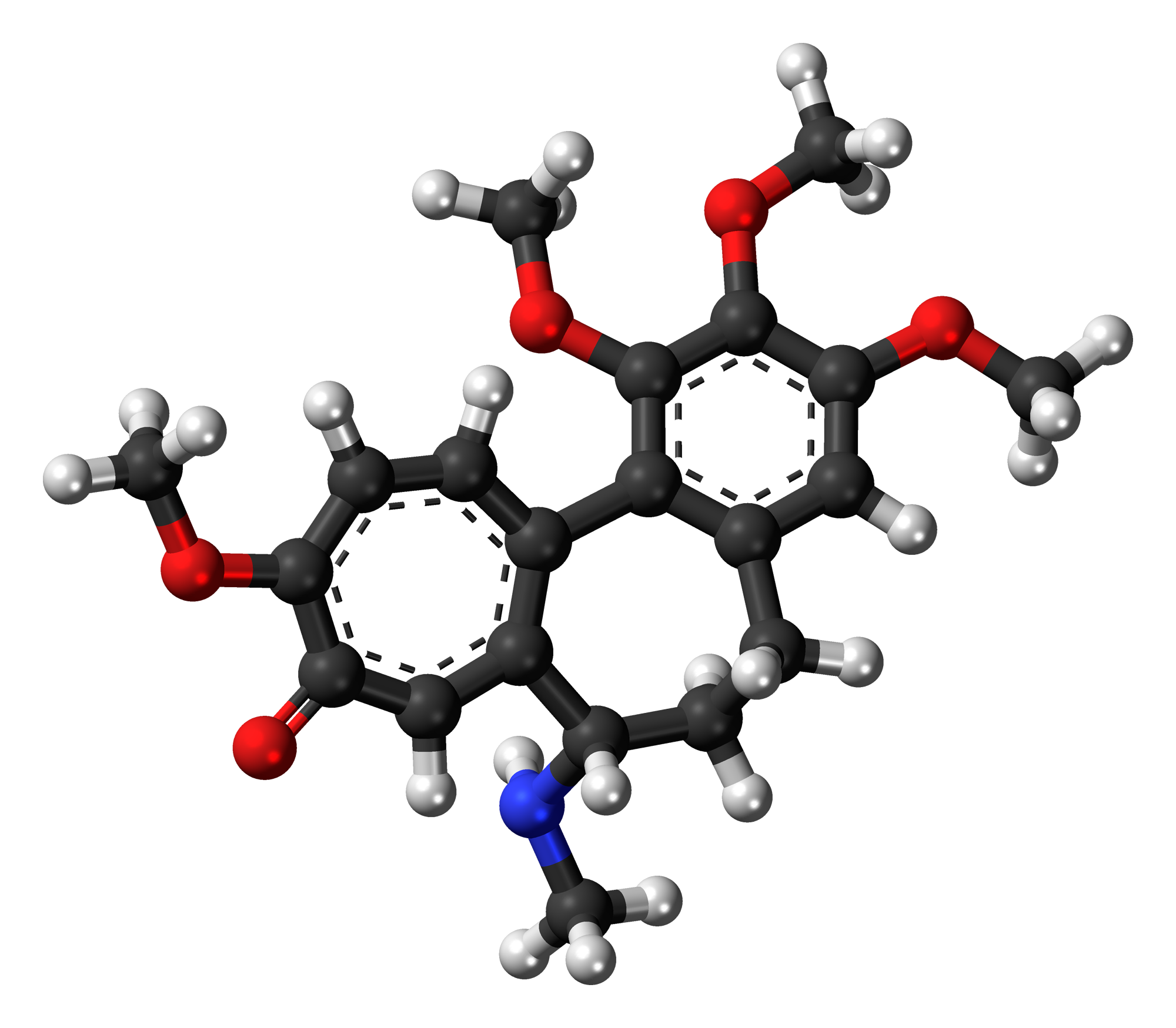

Clinical data
- Other names: Colcemid
- ATC code: L01CC01 (WHO)

Identifiers
- IUPAC name: (S)-1,2,3,10-Tetramethoxy-7-methylamino-6,7-dihydro-5H-benzo[a]heptalen-9-one
- CAS Number: 477-30-5
- PubChem CID: 220401
- ChemSpider: 191135
- UNII: Z01IVE25KI
- KEGG: C11250
- ChEMBL: ChEMBL312862
- CompTox Dashboard (EPA): DTXSID7020342
- ECHA InfoCard: 100.006.832

Chemical and physical data
- Formula: C_{21}H_{25}NO_{5}
- Molar mass: 371.433 g·mol^{−1}
- 3D model (JSmol): Interactive image
- SMILES: O=C/1C(\OC)=C/C=C2\C(=C\1)[C@@H](NC)CCc3c2c(OC)c(OC)c(OC)c3
- InChI: InChI=1S/C21H25NO5/c1-22-15-8-6-12-10-18(25-3)20(26-4)21(27-5)19(12)13-7-9-17(24-2)16(23)11-14(13)15/h7,9-11,15,22H,6,8H2,1-5H3/t15-/m0/s1; Key:NNJPGOLRFBJNIW-HNNXBMFYSA-N

Demecolcine (INN; also known as colcemid) is a drug used in chemotherapy. It is closely related to the natural alkaloid colchicine with the replacement of the acetyl group on the amino moiety with methyl, but it is less toxic. It depolymerises microtubules and limits microtubule formation (inactivates spindle fibre formation), thus arresting cells in metaphase and allowing cell harvest and karyotyping to be performed.

During cell division, demecolcine inhibits mitosis at metaphase by inhibiting spindle formation. Medically, demecolcine has been used to improve the results of cancer radiotherapy by synchronising tumour cells at metaphase, the radiosensitive stage of the cell cycle.

In animal cloning procedures, demecolcine makes an ovum eject its nucleus, creating space for insertion of a new nucleus.

== Mechanism of action ==
Demecolcine is a microtubule-depolymerizing drug like vinblastine. It acts by two distinct mechanisms. At very low concentration it binds to microtubule plus end to suppress microtubule dynamics. Recent study has found at higher concentration demecolcine can promote microtubule detachment from microtubule organizing center. Detached microtubules with unprotected minus end depolymerize with time. Cytotoxicity of the cells seems to correlate better with microtubule detachment. Lower concentration affects microtubule dynamics and cell migration.

== Research use ==
Demecolcine is used for scientific research in cells. It is used in a variety of ways, however, until recently, was used mostly for the study of mitosis in cells. For example, microtubules are necessary for the splitting of cells. More importantly, the movement of chromosomes during the M phase. Demecolcine inhibition of microtubules causes aneuploidy in mitotic cells where the microtubules fall apart or are suppressed before they can complete their function of pulling chromosomes into the daughter cell, also known as nondisjunction of chromosomes. Demecolcine, depending on dose, has also been found to cause DNA fragmentation of chromosomes in micronuclei when nondisjunction occurs.
