= Cytochalasin D =

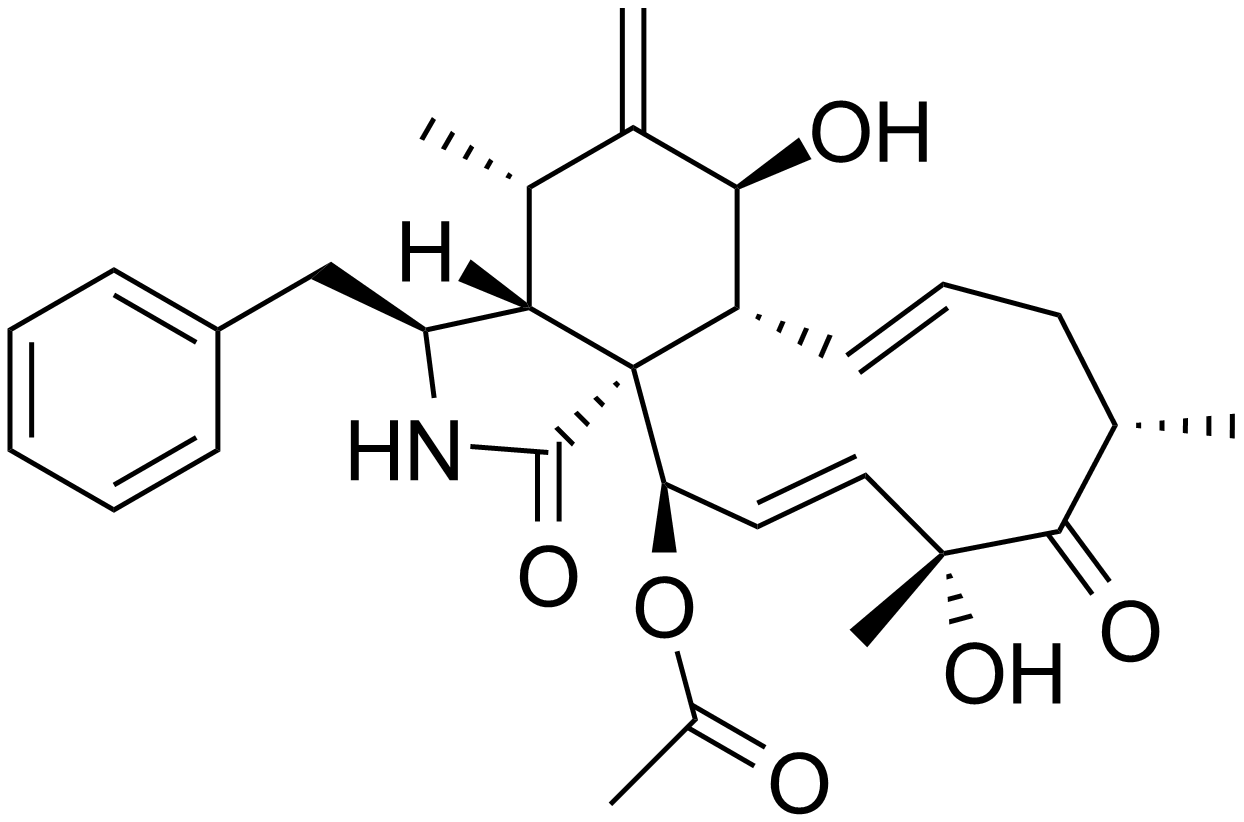

Names
- Other names Zygosporin A; Cytohalasin D; Lygosporin A

Identifiers
CAS Number	22144-77-0
3D model (JSmol)	Interactive image; Interactive image
ChEBI	CHEBI:529996
ChEMBL	ChEMBL260287
ChemSpider	16736231
ECHA InfoCard	100.040.716
EC Number	244-804-1
PubChem CID	5458428
UNII	SY9F0FZ3TO
UN number	3172 (CYTOCHALASIN D)
CompTox Dashboard (EPA)	DTXSID8037099
- InChI: InChI=1S/C30H37NO6/c1-17-10-9-13-22-26(33)19(3)18(2)25-23(16-21-11-7-6-8-12-21)31-28(35)30(22,25)24(37-20(4)32)14-15-29(5,36)27(17)34/h6-9,11-15,17-18,22-26,33,36H,3,10,16H2,1-2,4-5H3,(H,31,35)/b13-9-,15-14+ Key: SDZRWUKZFQQKKV-JIIHXHDGSA-N; InChI=1/C30H37NO6/c1-17-10-9-13-22-26(33)19(3)18(2)25-23(16-21-11-7-6-8-12-21)31-28(35)30(22,25)24(37-20(4)32)14-15-29(5,36)27(17)34/h6-9,11-15,17-18,22-26,33,36H,3,10,16H2,1-2,4-5H3,(H,31,35)/b13-9-,15-14+ Key: SDZRWUKZFQQKKV-JIIHXHDGBR
- SMILES: C[C@H]1C/C=C/[C@H]2[C@@H](C(=C)[C@H]([C@@H]3[C@@]2([C@@H](/C=C/[C@@](C1=O)(C)O)OC(=O)C)C(=O)N[C@H]3CC4=CC=CC=C4)C)O; CC(=O)OC4/C=C/C(C)(O)C(=O)C(C)C\C=C/C2C(O)C(=C)C(C)C3C(Cc1ccccc1)NC(=O)C234

Properties
Chemical formula	C_{30}H_{37}NO_{6}
Molar mass	507.627 g·mol^{−1}
- Except where otherwise noted, data are given for materials in their standard state (at 25 °C [77 °F], 100 kPa). verify (what is ?) Infobox references

Cytochalasin D is a member of the class of mycotoxins known as cytochalasins. Cytochalasin D is an alkaloid produced by Helminthosporium and other molds.

Cytochalasin D is a cell-permeable and potent inhibitor of actin polymerization. It disrupts actin microfilaments and activates the p53-dependent pathways causing arrest of the cell cycle at the G1-S transition. It is believed to bind to F-actin polymer and prevent polymerization of actin monomers.

It has been shown to inhibit smooth muscle contraction in mammals.
