= Cytochalasin B =

Names
- IUPAC name (1S,4E,6R,10R,12E,14S,15S,17S,18S,19S)-19-benzyl-6,15-dihydroxy-10,17-dimethyl-16-methylidene-2-oxa-20-azatricyclo[12.7.0.01,18]henicosa-4,12-diene-3,21-dione
- Other names Phomin

Identifiers
CAS Number	14930-96-2
3D model (JSmol)	Interactive image
ChEBI	CHEBI:23527
ChEMBL	ChEMBL411729
ChemSpider	4470791
ECHA InfoCard	100.035.440
EC Number	239-000-2
KEGG	C19954
PubChem CID	5311281
RTECS number	RO0205000
UNII	3CHI920QS7
CompTox Dashboard (EPA)	DTXSID30893482
- InChI: InChI=1S/C29H37NO5/c1-18-9-7-13-22(31)15-16-25(32)35-29-23(14-8-10-18)27(33)20(3)19(2)26(29)24(30-28(29)34)17-21-11-5-4-6-12-21/h4-6,8,11-12,14-16,18-19,22-24,26-27,31,33H,3,7,9-10,13,17H2,1-2H3,(H,30,34)/b14-8+,16-15+/t18-,19-,22-,23+,24+,26+,27-,29-/m1/s1 Key: GBOGMAARMMDZGR-TYHYBEHESA-N; InChI=1/C29H37NO5/c1-18-9-7-13-22(31)15-16-25(32)35-29-23(14-8-10-18)27(33)20(3)19(2)26(29)24(30-28(29)34)17-21-11-5-4-6-12-21/h4-6,8,11-12,14-16,18-19,22-24,26-27,31,33H,3,7,9-10,13,17H2,1-2H3,(H,30,34)/b14-8+,16-15+/t18-,19-,22-,23+,24+,26+,27-,29-/m1/s1 Key: GBOGMAARMMDZGR-TYHYBEHEBX
- SMILES: C[C@@H]1CCC[C@H](/C=C/C(=O)O[C@]23[C@@H](/C=C/C1)[C@@H](C(=C)[C@H]([C@H]2[C@@H](NC3=O)Cc4ccccc4)C)O)O

Properties
Chemical formula	C_{29}H_{37}NO_{5}
Molar mass	479.6 g/mol
Appearance	white to off-white powder
Density	1.21 g/cm^{3} (predicted)
Melting point	215 to 223 °C (419 to 433 °F; 488 to 496 K)
Boiling point	740.56 °C (1,365.01 °F; 1,013.71 K) at 760 mmHg (predicted)
Solubility in water	insoluble
Solubility in DMSO and MeOH	soluble

Hazards
- Occupational safety and health (OHS/OSH)
Main hazards	acute toxicity, health hazards
- GHS labelling
Pictograms	(GHS06: Toxic) (GHS08: Health hazard)
Signal word	Danger
Hazard statements	H300, H310, H330, H361
Precautionary statements	P201, P202, P260, P262, P264, P270, P271, P280, P281, P284, P301+P310, P302+P350, P304+P340, P308+P313, P310, P320, P321, P330, P361, P363, P403+P233, P405, P501
Safety data sheet (SDS)	Cytochalasin B MSDS from Fermentek
- Except where otherwise noted, data are given for materials in their standard state (at 25 °C [77 °F], 100 kPa). verify (what is ?) Infobox references

Cytochalasin B, the name of which comes from the Greek cytos (cell) and chalasis (relaxation), is a cell-permeable mycotoxin. It was found that substoichiometric concentrations of cytochalasin B (CB) strongly inhibit network formation by actin filaments. Due to this, it is often used in cytological research. It inhibits cytoplasmic division by blocking the formation of contractile microfilaments. It inhibits cell movement and induces nuclear extrusion. Cytochalasin B shortens actin filaments by blocking monomer addition at the fast-growing end of polymers. Cytochalasin B inhibits glucose transport and platelet aggregation. It blocks adenosine-induced apoptotic body formation without affecting activation of endogenous ADP-ribosylation in leukemia HL-60 cells. It is also used in cloning through nuclear transfer. Here enucleated recipient cells are treated with cytochalasin B. Cytochalasin B makes the cytoplasm of the oocytes more fluid and makes it possible to aspirate the nuclear genome of the oocyte within a small vesicle of plasma membrane into a micro-needle. Thereby, the oocyte genome is removed from the oocyte, while preventing rupture of the plasma membrane.

This alkaloid is isolated from a fungus, Helminthosporium dematioideum.

== History ==
=== 1960s ===
Cytochalasin B was first described in 1967, when it had been isolated from moulds by Dr W.B. Turner. Smith et al. found that CB causes multinucleation in cells and significantly affects cell motility. The multinucleated cells probably arise from failure of mitotic control, leading to variations in size and shape of interphase nuclei.

=== 1970s ===
In the 1970s, research on the mitosis of polynucleated cells was done. It appeared that these cells were created through progressive nuclear addition instead of nuclear division. The process by which this occurs is called pseudomitosis, which is the synchronous mitosis resulting in the division of just one nucleus. The separate nuclei are bound by a nuclear bridge and in binucleated cells the centrioles are doubled. Furthermore, it was found that CB causes the disorganization of the 50Å microfilaments of mouse epithelial cells which causes the cells to lose their shape. It also affects the appearance of young glands in cells and new gland formation in other cells. Another group found that CB inhibits the ability of HeLa cells to undergo cytokinesis by decomposition of the contractile ring. Research from 1971 showed that CB interferes with the release of iodine derived from thyroglobulin and blocks colloid endocytosis. Moreover, it was found that CB has an inhibitory effect on the uptake of sucrose-^{3}H by chang-strain human liver cells and in CB-treated cells alterations in the appearance and location of microfilaments were observed. Furthermore, it was found that CB reversibly inhibits melanin granule movement in melanocytes. One year later, research on the influence of cytochalasin B on chloroplasts was done. It was found that the light-oriented movement of chloroplasts is reversibly inhibited by cytochalasin B. In 1973 researches found that cytochalasin B is a powerful non-competitive inhibitor of glucose transport. One of the major electrophoretic identifiable erythrocyte membrane proteins may be the cytochalasin B binding site of erythrocytes.

=== From 1980 ===
In the following years, the knowledge concerning cytochalasin B was broadened. As the more general knowledge had been elucidated, more detailed analysis of e.g. the mechanism of action took place.

== Production ==
Cytochalasins can be isolated from the fungi in which they naturally occur. Originally, they were isolated from Helminthosporium dematioideum. Other producers include Phoma spp., Hormiscium spp. and Curvularia lunata. Additionally, it can be synthesized in the laboratory. There are several approaches to do so. Firstly, it is possible to form the six-membered ring of the isoindolone core and the larger macrocyclic ring simultaneously in a late-stage intramolecular Diels-Alder cyclization. Secondly, it is possible to first form the isoindolone core in an intermolecular Diels-Alder reaction and in a second step append the macrocycle in a stepwise fashion.

== Properties ==
Cytochalasin B contains several highly polar keto- and hydroxyl groups and one peripheric lipophilic benzyl unit.

== Mechanism ==
It is suggested that the predominant mechanism of cytochalasin B is the inhibition of actin filament polymerization through binding to the fast-growing (barbed) end of F-actin filaments. An alternative could involve capping proteins. By doing so, CB not only inhibits actin polymerization but also consecutive processes such as filament network build-up. This inhibition can affect all three major steps of actin polymerization

1. Nucleation: A core of minimal 3 actin monomers is formed.
2. Elongation: The core is used for elongation by addition of actin monomers.
3. Steady state/Annealing: A balance between polymerisation and depolymerisation is reached (steady-state). The F-actin filament stops growing and two barbed ends fuse to create one filament.

Nucleation is essential for filament build-up. The oligomerization is the rate-determining step, considering actin filament formation as a whole. The so-called lag phase of actin polymerization originates from this step. It takes quite a while until polymerization starts, but once it has, the process is autocatalytic until the physiological maximum of the polymerization rate is reached.

Elongation is favored at the barbed end of the growing filament. Here, the influence of cytochalasin B strongly depends on the overall conditions for elongation. If ideal physiological conditions are present, the inhibitory influence of cytochalasin B is minuscule. If the conditions are less optimal, elongation can be inhibited by up to 90 percent.

Annealing is the last step in polymerization. Cells treated with cytochalasin B and control group cells could not be distinguished. This indicated, that CB has no significant effect at this stage.

CB contains a beta-unsaturated ester which can undergo a Michael-type conjugation with nucleophiles. If this is the case, DNA-adduction might be a plausible reaction afterwards. A more suitable reaction seems to be the one with thiol-groups of several biomolecules. The thiol-groups would then no longer be available for disulfide bonds for further actin polymerization and thus a crucial step in actin polymerization is inhibited as the barbed ends of the filaments are blocked. An analogue principle is used by the well-studied capping proteins which are responsible for a natural limiting factor of actin polymerization. The first step in actin polymerization, after polymerization is initiated, is the deprotonation of the thiol group of G-actin. This renders the sulfur atom charged and makes it available for actin polymerization. If cytochalasin B is present in the cell, the deprotonation of thiol is competed. The reactive beta-unsaturated ester group of cytochalasin B reacts with the thiol group of actin via a nucleophilic attack of the charged sulfur onto the beta-carbon atom. This forces the π-bond to get dislocated on the left site of the beta-carbon. Consequently, mesomerism occurs, dislocating the negative charge between the alpha-carbon and the oxygen atom. This step is followed by a protonation step to counteract the negative charge. The hydronium ion needed to do so was produced during the activation of the sulfur atom in an earlier step.

== Metabolism ==
There are ten possible sites for the in vitro degradation of cytochalasin B. There is not yet any evidence that the same sites are used for degradation in vivo, but evidence has confirmed the in vitro sites. Degradation is initialized by a periodate cleavage of the compound, taking place at carbon 14 and 21. As a result, carbonic acid (A), formaldehyde (B), 5-methylhexane-1,1,6-triol (C) and a large remaining molecule (D) are released. Molecules C and D are then oxidized via Kuhn Roth reaction, leading to the formation of 7-hydroxyheptanal (F), acetic acid (G) and benzoic acid (I). Again, a larger molecule remains (J). F, G and I can undergo Schmidt reaction, if not degraded via acidic degradation by alcohol dehydrogenase (ADH) to methylamine and carbon dioxide (H). 7-hydroxyheptane is oxidized to 3-methylheptanedioic acid (K). Further metabolism leads to the formation of several smaller organic molecules such as amines (M), carbon dioxide (N) and acetic acid (O). The latter is again metabolized by ADH to methylamine and carbon dioxide (Q). Molecule J is cleaved into a number of small compounds such as acetic acid (L), methylamine and carbon dioxide (P), and a series of small methylated compounds.

== Efficacy and adverse effects ==
=== Interactions ===
When adding cytochalasin B and the beta-adrenergic agonist (-)-isoproterenol, prostaglandin E1 or cholera toxin to wild type S49 lymphoma cells, cAMP accumulates. Cytochalasin B is unable to transform 3T3-like tumor cells, but it did increase the frequency of cell transformation by the polyoma virus 8-40 fold. Furthermore, CB can intensify pinocytosis, which is induced by concanavalin A in amoeba proteus. Cytochalasin B can also interact with the auxin indole-3-acetic acid which occurs in wheat coleoptile segments and maize roots. This interaction leads to the inhibition of vesicle transport and secretion of cell wall components and thereby blocks elongation and growth.

=== Efficacy ===
In vitro studies showed that a concentration of 30 μM of cytochalasin B significantly reduces the relative viscosity of a 20 μM normal actin filament solution as well as it has decreased in a 20 μMm glutathionyl-actin filament solution. In vivo the effective concentration is even lower. It seemed that a 2 μM concentration is sufficient in living cells to accomplish a measurable influence on the actin polymerization. The nucleation phase took 2-4 times as long as in the control groups. On elongation, the effects were minimal; on annealing negligible. This might be due to an actual difference in molecular interactions of cytochalasin B during those three steps or simply due to the fact that the lag phase is the rate-determining step in the overall polymerization.

== Applications ==
=== Actin polymerization studies ===
As cytochalasin B inhibits actin filament polymerization, many cellular processes depending on actin filament functions are affected. Cytokinesis is inhibited, however, mitosis is unaffected. Due to the effects on several cellular functions but lack of general toxicity, cytochalasin B is applied in actin polymerization studies, cell imaging methods, cell cycle studies and can possibly be used as anticancer drug.

=== Inhibits cell division ===
Cytochalasin B is used for testing of the genotoxicity of substances. In order to do so, cytokinesis-block micronucleus assay (CBMN assay) with human lymphocytes is applied. This works in vitro. During anaphase of mitosis of meiosis, micronuclei can be detected. These are small nuclei containing one chromosome or part of a chromosome which did not get to one of the cell poles during cell division. The CBMN test is based on the fact that only dividing cells can express micronuclei, which means that only in those cells, chromosome damage can be detected. Because genotoxicity causes abnormalities in cell division, micronuclei can be detected in binucleated cells. Cytokinesis, which is the next stage, is inhibited by cytochalasin B. A key advantage of this method is that it allows simultaneous detection of multiple molecular events leading to chromosome damage and chromosomal instability. The CBMN assay has successfully been applied to normal human lymphocytes, mouse spleen lymphocytes, mouse fibroblasts and Chinese hamster fibroblasts.

=== Inhibits cell movement ===
Cytochalasin B can decrease the number of motile cells when it is added to Yoshida Sarcoma Cells. It can also decrease the motility of the cells and dose-dependently inhibits their growth. Since cytochalasin B unevenly penetrates cells it promotes focal contractions of the broken cortical actin filament network by myosin. This causes superprecipitation which requires active contractions and thus an active energy metabolism. The disorganized cortical contractions disrupt the assembly of pseudopodia which are involved in cell movement.

=== Induces nuclear extrusion ===
Nuclear extrusion induced by cytochalasin B begins with the movement of the nucleus to the plasma membrane, followed by bulge formation in the membrane. The nucleus then moves to the outside of the membrane, but stays connected to the cell by a thread-like cytoplasmic bridge. If the cells are kept in cytochalasin B containing medium for several hours, the process becomes irreversible. Extrusion could be assisted by the CB-induced weakening of the plasma membrane.

=== Inhibits glucose transport ===
It has been shown that cytochalasin B binds covalently to mammalian glucose transporter proteins when irradiated with UV light. It bound tighter to AraE and GalP than their usual substrates. Cytochalasin B has been shown to inhibit GLUT1, 2, 3 and 4. Binding to GLUT1 occurs at the inside as cytochalasin B acts as it acts as a competitive inhibitor of glucose exit. Additional evidence comes from photolabeling studies in which the Trp388 and Trp412 in TM10 and TM11 of the purified protein are labeled upon exposure to labeled cytochalasin B. Since mutating Trp388 and Trp412 does not completely reduce inhibition of GLUT1, it is assumed that other sites are involved in CB binding as well.

=== Therapeutic uses ===
For therapeutic purposes, research on cytochalasin B is done. In order to do so, the effects of cytochalasin B on tumor cells by BCG (Bacillus Calmette-Guerin)-activated macrophages were examined. It showed that cytochalasin B enhances tumor cell lysis and stasis due to activated macrophages at a concentration of 10^{−7} M. Cytochalasin B does not act on the macrophage itself, but does exert its effect predominantly on the tumor cell. A reason for this could be, that the actin filament formation, which could be important for the destruction of tumor cells by activated macrophages, is inhibited by cytochalasin B.

=== Further effects ===
Cytochalasin B has an effect on thyroid hormone and growth hormone secretion. Phosphatidylcholine and phosphatidylethanolamine biosynthesis is inhibited by cytochalasin B, as shown by George et al. It does so by inhibiting the conversion of phosphoethanolamine to cytidinediphosphate-ethanolamine. It was proposed that the mechanism is associated with alterations of intracellular calcium ions. Cytochalasin B also has effects on bacteria. For example, the growth and differentiation of E. histolytica is inhibited.[56] Furthermore, cytochalasin B has been shown to have an inhibitory effect on tumor cell growth without causing prolonged and/or profound immunosuppressive effects.

=== Natural context ===
In nature, cytochalasin B is involved in fungal virulence, food spoilage and the maintenance of the symbiosis between host and symbiont.
