= Bretscher =

Surname list

Bretscher is a Swiss German surname. Notable people include:

- Anthony P. Bretscher (born 1950), English professor
- Egon Bretscher (1901–1973), Swiss nuclear physicist
- Mark Bretscher (born 1940), British scientist, brother of Anthony
- Robert Bretscher (born 1953), Swiss gymnast
- Willy Bretscher (1897–1992), Swiss writer
