= Muniscins =

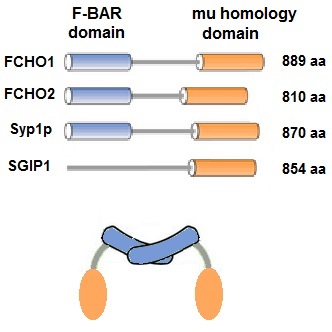
Structure of Muniscin proteins and a dimer of FCHO proteins

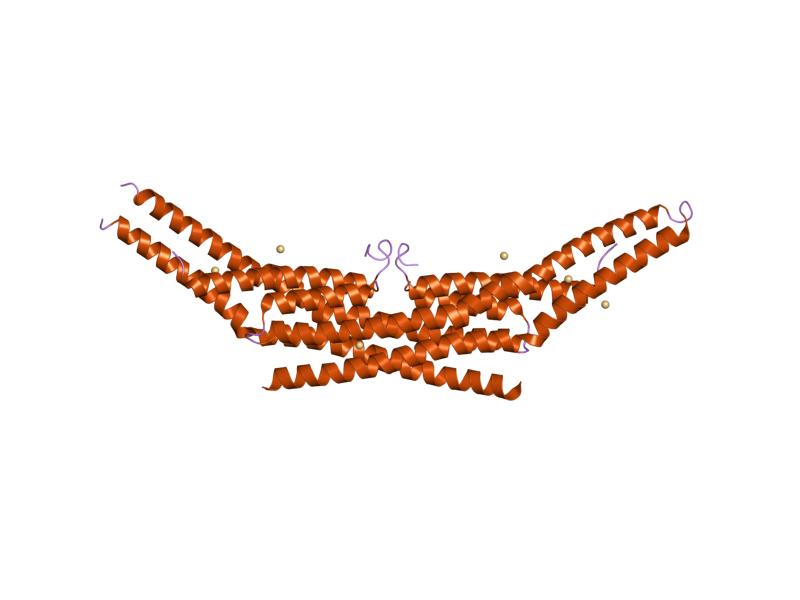
Ribbon representation of BAR domains from two monomers of endophilin-A1.

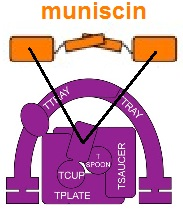
The μ homology domain of muniscins evolved from TCUP

The muniscin protein family was initially defined in 2009 as proteins having 2 homologous domains that are involved in clathrin mediated endocytosis (CME) and have been reviewed. In addition to FCHO1, FCHO2 and Syp1, SGIP1 is also included in the family because it contains the μ (mu) homology domain and is involved in CME, even though it does not contain the F-BAR domain

Muniscins are known as alternate cargo adaptors. That is, they participate in selecting which cargo molecules are internalized via CME. Additionally, the structure of the dimer, with its concave face oriented toward the plasma membrane, is thought to help curve the membrane as the clathrin coated pit forms. The muniscins are early arriving proteins involved in CME. FCHO proteins are required for CME, but do not appear to be required to initiate CME.

The μ homology domain of muniscins has been reported to have evolved from part of an ancient cargo adaptor protein complex named TSET.

== See also ==
- AP2 adaptor complex
- Vesicular transport adaptor protein
