= Adaptor complexes medium subunit domain =

Adap_comp_sub
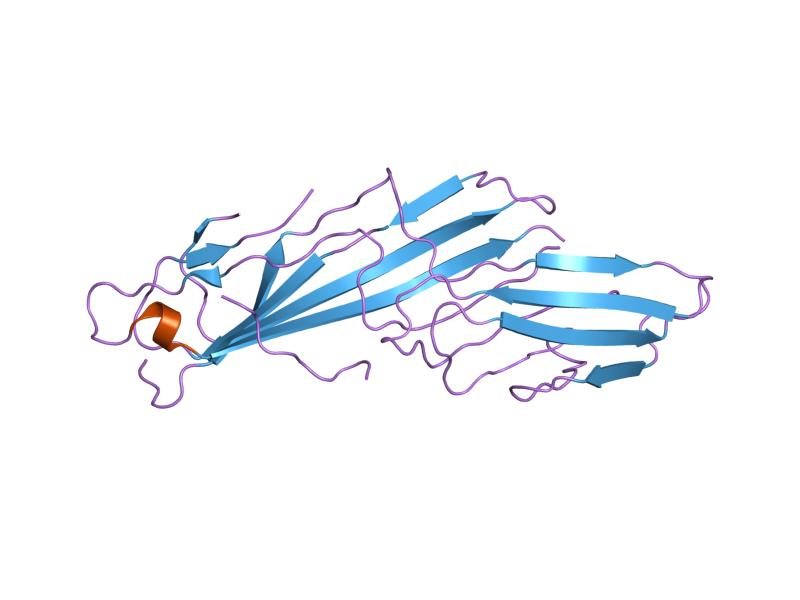
- mu2 adaptin subunit (ap50) of ap2 adaptor (second domain), complexed with ctla-4 internalization peptide ttgvyvkmppt

Identifiers
- Symbol: Adap_comp_sub
- Pfam: PF00928
- Pfam clan: CL0448
- InterPro: IPR008968
- PROSITE: PDOC00761
- SCOP2: 1bxx / SCOPe / SUPFAM
Available protein structures:
- PDB: IPR008968 PF00928 (ECOD; PDBsum)
- AlphaFold: IPR008968; PF00928

In molecular biology, the adaptor complexes medium subunit domain is a protein domain found at the C-terminus of the mu subunit from various clathrin adaptor protein complexes (AP1, AP2, AP3, AP4 and AP5) and muniscins. The C-terminal domain has an immunoglobulin-like beta-sandwich fold consisting of 9 strands in 2 sheets with a Greek key topology, similar to that found in cytochrome f and certain transcription factors. The mu subunit regulates the coupling of clathrin lattices with particular membrane proteins by self-phosphorylation via a mechanism that is still unclear. The mu subunit possesses a highly conserved N-terminal domain of around 230 amino acids, which may be the region of interaction with other AP proteins; a linker region of between 10 and 42 amino acids; and a less well-conserved C-terminal domain of around 190 amino acids, which may be the site of specific interaction with the protein being transported in the vesicle.
