= Beta2-adaptin C-terminal domain =

B2-adapt-app_C
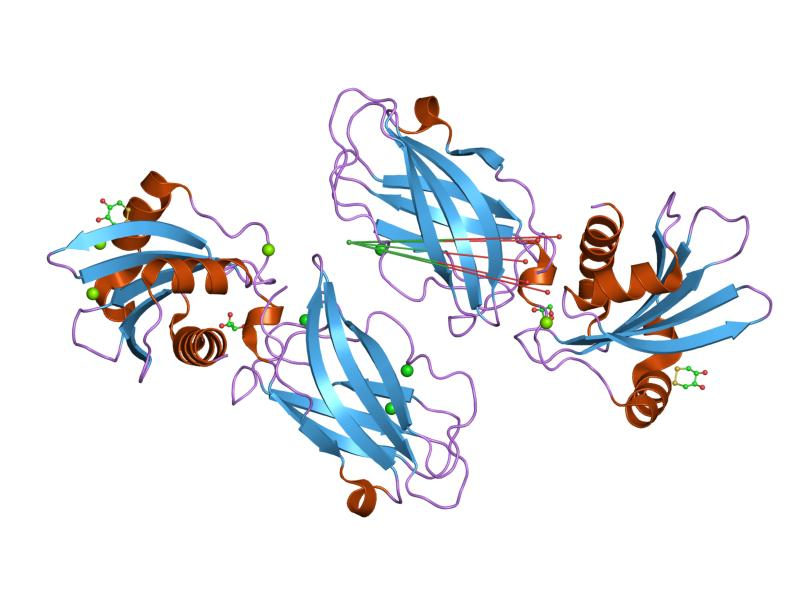
- beta2-adaptin appendage domain, from clathrin adaptor ap2

Identifiers
- Symbol: B2-adapt-app_C
- Pfam: PF09066
- InterPro: IPR015151
- SCOP2: 1e42 / SCOPe / SUPFAM
Available protein structures:
- PDB: IPR015151 PF09066 (ECOD; PDBsum)
- AlphaFold: IPR015151; PF09066

The C-terminal domain of Beta2-adaptin is a protein domain is involved in cell trafficking by aiding import and export of substances in and out of the cell.

== Function ==
This is an adaptor protein which helps the formation of a clathrin coat around a vesicle.

== Structure ==
This entry represents a subdomain of the appendage (ear) domain of beta-adaptin from AP clathrin adaptor complexes. This domain has a three-layer arrangement, alpha-beta-alpha, with a bifurcated antiparallel beta-sheet. This domain is required for binding to clathrin, and its subsequent polymerisation. Furthermore, a hydrophobic patch present in the domain also binds to a subset of D-phi-F/W motif-containing proteins that are bound by the alpha-adaptin appendage domain (epsin, AP180, eps15).

== Cell trafficking ==
Proteins synthesized on the ribosome and processed in the endoplasmic reticulum are transported from the Golgi apparatus to the trans-Golgi network (TGN), and from there via small carrier vesicles to their final destination compartment. These vesicles have specific coat proteins (such as clathrin or coatomer) that are important for cargo selection and direction of transport. Clathrin coats contain both clathrin (acts as a scaffold) and adaptor complexes that link clathrin to receptors in coated vesicles. Clathrin-associated protein complexes are believed to interact with the cytoplasmic tails of membrane proteins, leading to their selection and concentration. The two major types of clathrin adaptor complexes are the heterotetrameric adaptor protein (AP) complexes, and the monomeric GGA (Golgi-localising, Gamma-adaptin ear domain homology, ARF-binding proteins) adaptors.

AP (adaptor protein) complexes are found in coated vesicles and clathrin-coated pits. AP complexes connect cargo proteins and lipids to clathrin at vesicle budding sites, as well as binding accessory proteins that regulate coat assembly and disassembly (such as AP180, epsins and auxilin). There are different AP complexes in mammals. AP1 is responsible for the transport of lysosomal hydrolases between the TGN and endosomes. AP2 associates with the plasma membrane and is responsible for endocytosis. AP3 is responsible for protein trafficking to lysosomes and other related organelles. AP4 is less well characterised. AP complexes are heterotetramers composed of two large subunits (adaptins), a medium subunit (mu) and a small subunit (sigma). For example, in AP1 these subunits are gamma-1-adaptin, beta-1-adaptin, mu-1 and sigma-1, while in AP2 they are alpha-adaptin, beta-2-adaptin, mu-2 and sigma-2. Each subunit has a specific function. Adaptins recognise and bind to clathrin through their hinge region (clathrin box), and recruit accessory proteins that modulate AP function through their C-terminal ear (appendage) domains. Mu recognises tyrosine-based sorting signals within the cytoplasmic domains of transmembrane cargo proteins. One function of clathrin and AP2 complex-mediated endocytosis is to regulate the number of GABA(A) receptors available at the cell surface .

More information about these proteins can be found at Protein of the Month: Clathrin .
