= AP5M1 =

Protein-coding gene in the species Homo sapiens

Identifiers
- Aliases: AP5M1, C14orf108, MUDENG, Mu5, MuD, adaptor related protein complex 5 mu 1 subunit, adaptor related protein complex 5 subunit mu 1
- External IDs: OMIM: 614368; MGI: 1921635; GeneCards: AP5M1

Gene location (Human)
Chr.	Chromosome 14 (human)
Band	14q22.3	Start	57,268,924 bp
Band	14q22.3	End	57,298,742 bp
RNA expression pattern
Bgee	Human / Mouse (ortholog); Top expressed in: jejunal mucosa; Epithelium of choroid plexus; endothelial cell; mucosa of sigmoid colon; retinal pigment epithelium; palpebral conjunctiva; rectum; right ventricle; duodenum; kidney tubule / n/a; More reference expression data
BioGPS	n/a
Gene ontology
Molecular function	protein binding
Cellular component	cytoplasm; lysosomal membrane; cytosol; endosome; late endosome; lysosome; AP-type membrane coat adaptor complex; membrane; late endosome membrane
Biological process	protein transport; endosomal transport
Sources:Amigo / QuickGO
Orthologs
Databases	NCBI: entry; OMA: entry
Species	Human	Mouse
Entrez	55745	74385
Ensembl	ENSG00000053770	n/a
UniProt	Q9H0R1	Q8BJ63
RefSeq (mRNA)	NM_018229	NM_144535; NM_001360070
RefSeq (protein)	NP_060699	NP_653118; NP_001346999
Location (UCSC)	Chr 14: 57.27 – 57.3 Mb	n/a
PubMed search
- Wikidata
View/Edit Human	View/Edit Mouse

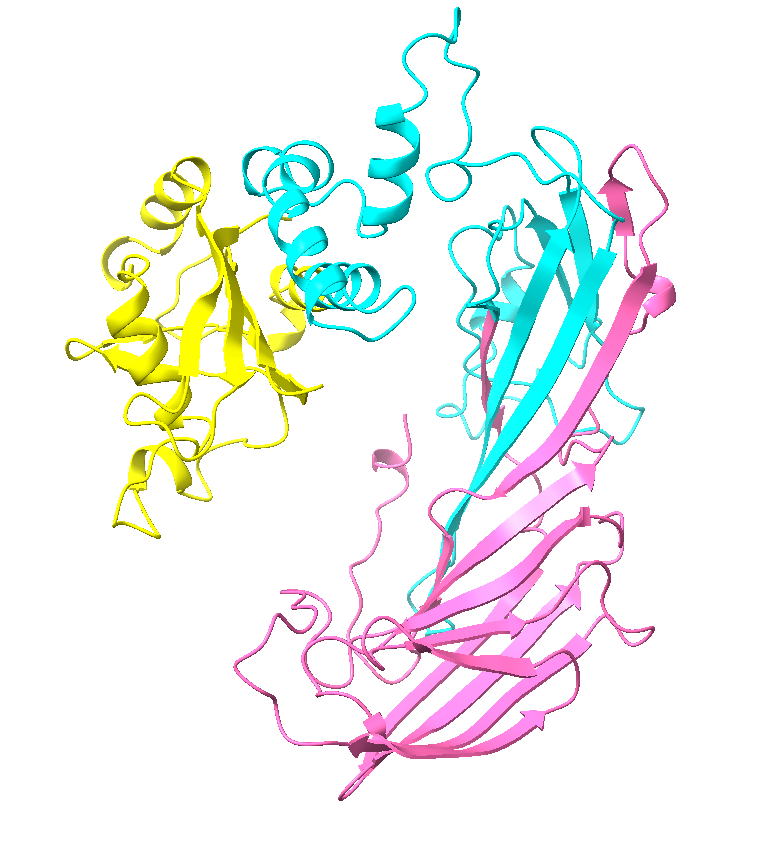
The 3D structure of the protein AP5M1. The alpha fold structure was obtained from Uniprot (AF-Q9H0R1-F1) and modeled using ChimeraX. The three domains are emphasized with color. The first domain is yellow, the second domain is teal, and the third domain is pink.

AP-5 complex subunit mu (AP5M1), otherwise known as MUDENG (MuD), is a protein that is encoded by the AP5M1 gene. The AP5M1 gene was originally discovered when screening for genes which helped to promote death in Fas-mediated apoptosis. It is a highly conserved gene.

MuD is the medium-sized subunit of the AP5 adaptor complex. MuD is expressed throughout the body and is located within both the mitochondria as well as the endoplasmic reticulum (ER) of cells.

MuD has been shown to have the ability to induce apoptosis; however, there is evidence that it plays an anti-apoptotic role in apoptosis mediated by tumor necrosis factor-related apoptosis-inducing ligand (TRAIL).

== Structure ==
MuD consists of 490 amino acids that interact to form a tertiary structure with three domains.

The overall structure shares similarities with adaptor protein (AP) complexes that are related to clathrin-mediated endocytosis; amino acids 197 through 417 are a shared adaptin domain found in AP μ subunits.

Within the adaptin domain are two aspartic acids, D276 and D290, which serve as binding sites for caspase-3.

== Function ==
The overall function of MuD remains unclear. It is known, however, that MuD regulates the expression of BAX, a pro-apoptotic member of the Bcl-2 family of proteins. Due to— and dependent upon— this relationship, MuD has been able to induce cell death in tumor cells.

Additionally, MuD has been suggested to be involved in endosomal trafficking.

== TRAIL and MuD ==
TRAIL, an apoptosis-inducing ligand, activates caspase-8 and caspase-3, which initiate the intrinsic pathway of apoptosis by cleaving BH3 interacting-domain death agonist (Bid) into tBid, another pro-apoptotic member of the Bl-2 protein family. MuD interferes with this process because D276 and D290 act as alternative binding sites for caspase-3, decreasing the amount of Bid that gets cleaved. Tumor cells being treated with TRAIL are 32% more likely to survive when MuD is being expressed.
