= Adaptor protein =

Adaptor protein may refer to:

- Signal transducing adaptor protein
- Vesicular transport adaptor protein
  - Clathrin adaptor protein, also known as adaptin
