= Vesicular transport adaptor protein =

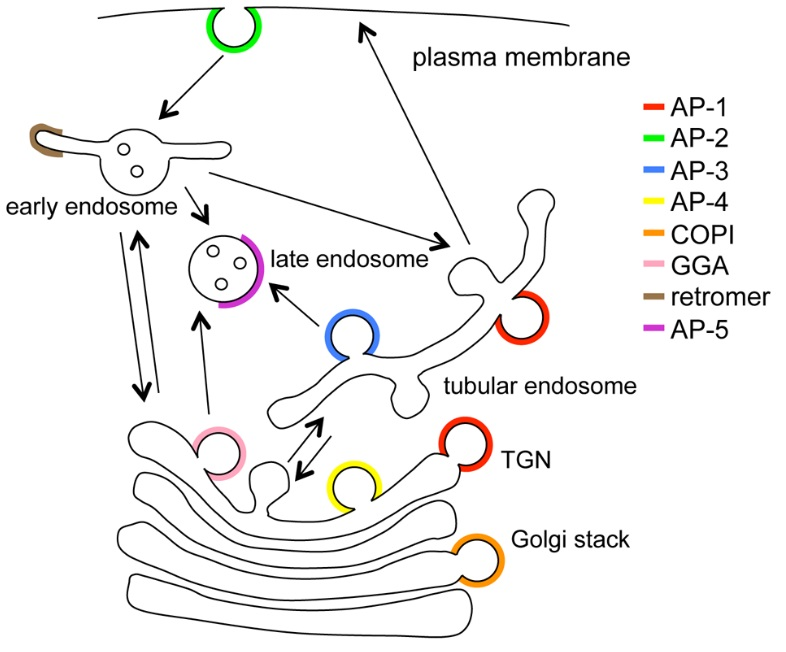
An overview of the trafficking of some adaptor protein (AP) complexes.

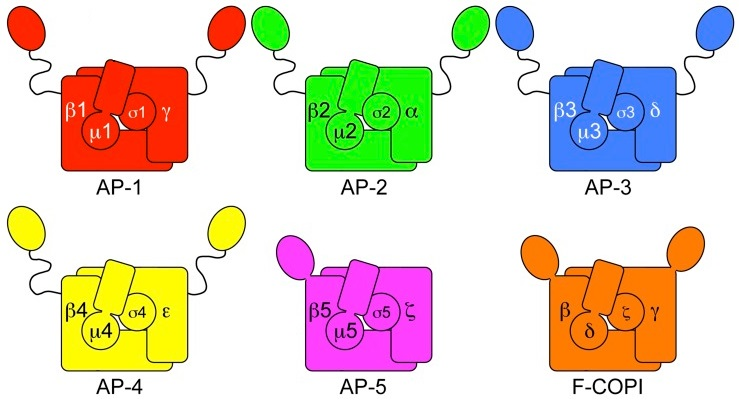
Adaptor Protein complexes and COPI-F subcomplex.

Vesicular transport adaptor proteins are proteins involved in forming complexes that function in the trafficking of molecules from one subcellular location to another. These complexes concentrate the correct cargo molecules in vesicles that bud or extrude off of one organelle and travel to another location, where the cargo is delivered. While some of the details of how these adaptor proteins achieve their trafficking specificity has been worked out, there is still much to be learned.

There are several human disorders associated with defects in components of these complexes including Alzheimer's and Parkinson's diseases.

== The proteins ==
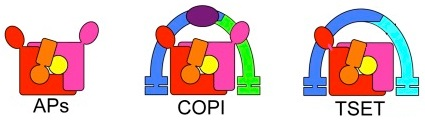
Adaptor Protein, COPI and TSET complexes.

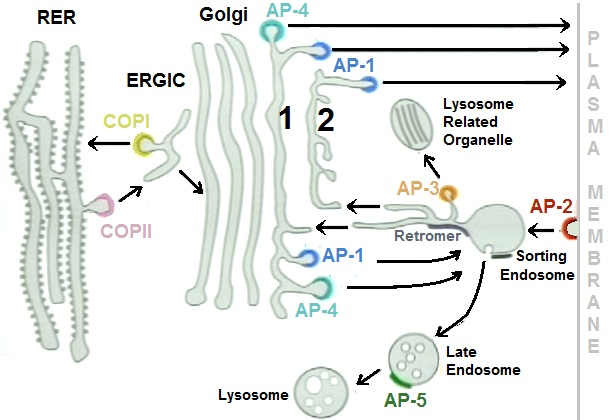
More trafficking pathways. Note, the colors are not the same as in the lead figure

A rendering of a COPII tube.

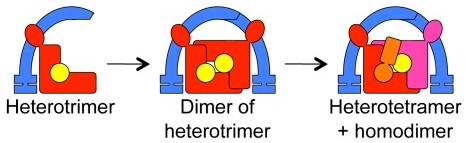
The early evolution of adaptor protein complexes

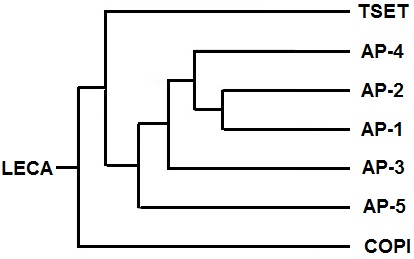
The evolution of TSET, COPI and APs from the Last Eukaryotic Common Ancestor

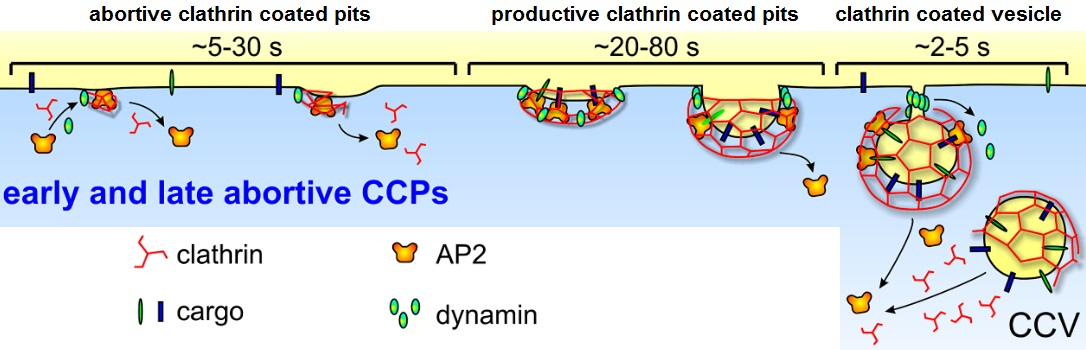
Production of a clathrin coated vesicle

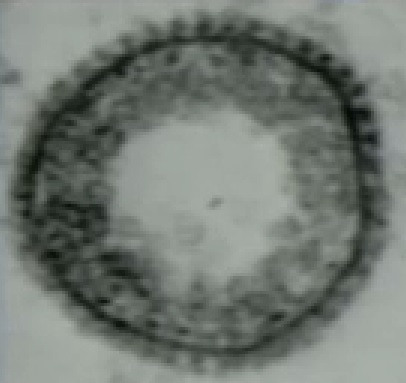
Electron microscope image of a coated vesicle. EM series showing the budding of these kind of vesicles can be seen and

Most of the adaptor proteins are heterotetramers. In the AP complexes, there are two large proteins (~100 kD) and two smaller proteins. One of the large proteins is termed β (beta), with β1 in the AP-1 complex, β2 in the AP-2 complex, and so on. The other large protein has different designations in the different complexes. In AP-1 it is named γ (gamma), AP-2 has α (alpha), AP-3 has δ (delta), AP-4 has ε (epsilon) and AP-5 has ζ (zeta). The two smaller proteins are a medium subunit named μ (mu ~50 kD) and a small subunit σ (sigma ~20 kD), and named 1 through 5 corresponding to the 5 AP complexes. Components of COPI (cop one) a coatomer, and TSET (T-set) a membrane trafficking complex have similar heterotetramers of the AP complexes.

Retromer is not closely related, has been reviewed, and its proteins will not be described here. GGAs (Golgi-localising, Gamma-adaptin ear domain homology, ARF-binding proteins) are a group of related proteins (three in humans) that act as monomeric clathrin adaptor proteins in various important membrane vesicle traffickings, but are not similar to any of the AP complexes and will not be discussed in detail in this article. Stonins (not shown in the lead figure) are also monomers similar in some regards to GGA and will also not be discussed in detail in this article.

PTBs are protein domains that include NUMB, DAB1 and DAB2. Epsin and AP180 in the ANTH domain are other adaptor proteins that have been reviewed.

An important transport complex, COPII, was not shown in the lead figure. The COPII complex is a heterohexamer, but not closely related to the AP/TSET complexes. The individual proteins of the COPII complex are called SEC proteins, because they are encoded by genes identified in secretory mutants of yeast. One especially interesting aspect of COPII is that it can form typical spherical vesicles and tubules to transport large molecules like collagen precursors, which cannot fit inside typical spherical vesicles. COPII structure has been discussed in an open article and will not be a focus of this article. These are examples of the much larger set of cargo adaptors.

== Evolutionary considerations ==
The most recent common ancestor (MRCA) of the eukaryotes must have had a mechanism for trafficking molecules between its endomembranes and organelles, and the likely identity of the adaptor complex involved has been reported. It is believed that the MRCA had 3 proteins involved in trafficking and that they formed a heterotrimer. That heterotrimer next "dimerized" to form a 6 membered-complex. The individual components further changed into the current complexes, in the order shown, with AP1 and AP2 being the last to diverge.

In addition, one component of TSET, a muniscin also known as the TCUP protein, appears to have evolved into part of the proteins of opisthokonts (animals and fungi). Parts of the AP complexes have evolved into parts of the GGA and stonin proteins. There is evidence indicating that parts of the nuclear pore complex and COPII may be evolutionarily related.

== Formation of transport vesicles ==
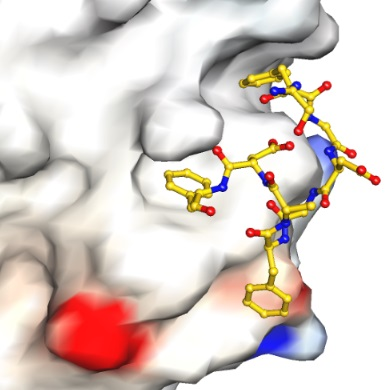
A small portion of an accessory protein binds specifically to part of AP-2 complex

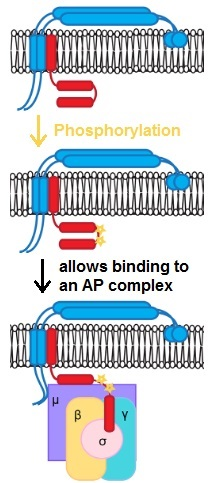
Protein phosphorylation allows specific interactions with a clathrin adaptor protein complex

The best characterized type of vesicle is the clathrin coated vesicle (CCV). The formation of a COPII vesicle at the endoplasmic reticulum and its transport to the Golgi body. The involvement of the heterotetramer of COPI is similar to that of the AP/clathrin situation, but the coat of COPI is not closely related to the coats of either CCVs or COPII vesicles. AP-5 is associated with 2 proteins, SPG11 and SPG15, which have some structural similarity to clathrin, and may form the coat around the AP-5 complex, but the ultrastructure of that coat is not known. The coat of AP-4 is unknown. (Note: AP-4 is much less abundant than other AP complexes and is absent from several model organisms, which makes biochemical and genetic analyses more difficult.)

An almost universal feature of coat assembly is the recruitment of the various adaptor complexes to the "donor" membrane by the protein Arf1. The one known exception is AP-2, which is recruited by a particular plasma membrane lipid.

Another almost universal feature of coat assembly is that the adaptors are recruited first, and they then recruit the coats. The exception is COPI, in which the 7 proteins are recruited to the membrane as a heptamer.

As illustrated in the accompanying image, the production of a coated vesicle is not instantaneous, and a considerable fraction of the maturation time is used by making "abortive" or "futile" interactions until enough interactions occur simultaneously to allow the structure to continue to develop.

The last step in the formation of a transport vesicle is "pinching off" from the donor membrane. This requires energy, but even in the well studied case of CCVs, not all require dynamin. The accompanying illustration shows the case for AP-2 CCVs, however AP-1 and AP-3 CCVs do not use dynamin.

== Selection of cargo molecules ==
Which cargo molecules are incorporated into a particular type of vesicle relies on specific interactions. Some of these interactions are directly with AP complexes and some are indirectly with "alternative adaptors", as shown in this diagram. As examples, membrane proteins can have direct interactions, while proteins that are soluble in the lumen of the donor organelle bind indirectly to AP complexes by binding to membrane proteins that traverse the membrane and bind at their lumenal end to the desired cargo molecule. Molecules that should not be included in the vesicle appear to be excluded by "molecular crowding".

The "signals" or amino acid "motifs" in the cargo proteins that interact with the adaptor proteins can be very short. For example, one well-known example is the dileucine motif, in which a leucine amino acid (aa) residue is followed immediately by another leucine or isoleucine residue. (Note: The complete "dileucine based" motif is (D/E)XXXL(L/I), where X is any aa and D/E is either aspartic or glutamic acid residues) An even simpler example is the tyrosine based signal, which is YxxØ (a tyrosine residue separated by 2 aa residues from another bulky, hydrophobic aa residue). The accompanying figure shows how a small part of a protein can interact specifically with another protein, so these short signalling motifs should not be surprising. The sort of sequence comparisons used, in part, to define these motifs.

In some cases, post-translational modifications, such as phosphorylations (shown in the figure) are important for cargo recognition.

== Diseases ==
Adaptor diseases have been reviewed.

AP-2/CCVs are involved in autosomal recessive hypercholesterolemia through the associated low-density lipoprotein receptor adapter protein 1.

Retromer is involved in recycling components of the plasma membrane. The importance of that recycling at a synapse is hinted at in one of the figures in the gallery. There are at least 3 ways in which retromer dysfunction can contribute to brain disorders, including Alzheimer and Parkinson diseases.

AP-5 is the most recently described complex, and one reason supporting the idea that it is an authentic adaptor complex is that it is associated with hereditary spastic paraplegia, as is AP-4. AP-1 is linked to MEDNIK syndrome. AP-3 is linked to Hermansky–Pudlak syndrome. COPI is linked to an autoimmune disease. COPII is linked to cranio-lenticulo-sutural dysplasia. One of the GGA proteins may be involved in Alzheimer's disease.

== Gallery ==
Synapse components recycle through transport vesicles

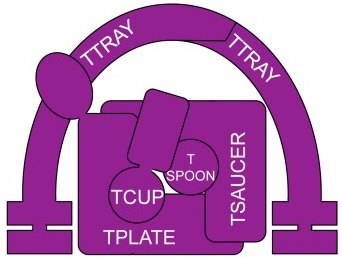
The TSET membrane trafficking complex

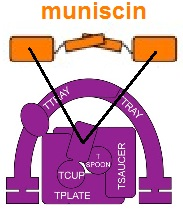
Muniscin evolved from a part of TCUP

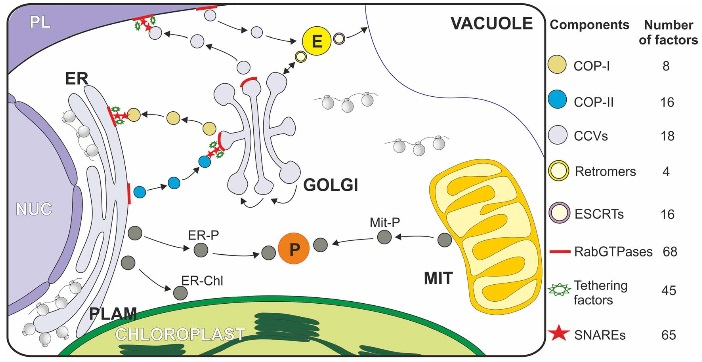
Vesicle transport pathways in plants.

== See also ==
- Exomer
- List of adaptins
- SNAREs
- Molecular evolution
- Biogenesis of lysosome-related organelles complex 1
