= CLTB =

Protein-coding gene in humans

Identifiers
- Aliases: CLTB, LCB, clathrin light chain B
- External IDs: OMIM: 118970; MGI: 1921575; GeneCards: CLTB

Gene location (Human)
Chr.	Chromosome 5 (human)
Band	5q35.2	Start	176,392,501 bp
Band	5q35.2	End	176,416,539 bp

Gene location (Mouse)
Chr.	Chromosome 13 (mouse)
Band	13|13 B1	Start	54,740,214 bp
Band	13|13 B1	End	54,759,157 bp
RNA expression pattern
Bgee	Human / Mouse (ortholog); Top expressed in: skin of leg; skin of abdomen; gingival epithelium; apex of heart; mucosa of transverse colon; gastrocnemius muscle; right auricle of heart; left ventricle; right frontal lobe; muscle of thigh / Top expressed in: neural layer of retina; lip; superior frontal gyrus; dentate gyrus of hippocampal formation granule cell; cerebellar cortex; muscle of thigh; esophagus; primary visual cortex; anterior horn of spinal cord; skin of external ear; More reference expression data
BioGPS	n/a
Gene ontology
Molecular function	clathrin heavy chain binding; peptide binding; protein binding; structural molecule activity
Cellular component	ciliary membrane; clathrin-coated pit; clathrin coat of trans-Golgi network vesicle; membrane; cytoplasmic vesicle membrane; cytoplasmic vesicle; clathrin coat of coated pit; intracellular membrane-bounded organelle; trans-Golgi network; clathrin vesicle coat; clathrin coat; plasma membrane; cytosol; synaptic vesicle membrane; clathrin-coated endocytic vesicle; presynaptic endocytic zone membrane; postsynaptic endocytic zone cytoplasmic component
Biological process	clathrin-dependent endocytosis; vesicle-mediated transport; intracellular protein transport; membrane organization; clathrin coat assembly
Sources:Amigo / QuickGO
Orthologs
Databases	NCBI: entry; OMA: entry
Species	Human	Mouse
Entrez	1212	74325
Ensembl	ENSG00000175416	ENSMUSG00000047547
UniProt	P09497	Q6IRU5
RefSeq (mRNA)	NM_001834; NM_007097; NM_001364126; NM_001364127	NM_028870; NM_001347512
RefSeq (protein)	NP_001825; NP_009028; NP_001351055; NP_001351056; NP_001825.1	NP_001334441; NP_083146
Location (UCSC)	Chr 5: 176.39 – 176.42 Mb	Chr 13: 54.74 – 54.76 Mb
PubMed search
- Wikidata
View/Edit Human	View/Edit Mouse

Clathrin, light chain B is a protein in humans that is encoded by the CLTB gene.

Clathrin is a large, soluble protein composed of heavy and light chains. It functions as the main structural component of the lattice-type cytoplasmic face of coated pits and coated vesicles which entrap specific macromolecules during receptor-mediated endocytosis. This gene encodes one of two clathrin light chain proteins which are believed to function as regulatory elements. Alternative splicing results in multiple transcript variants. [provided by RefSeq, Jul 2008].
