= ANTH domain =

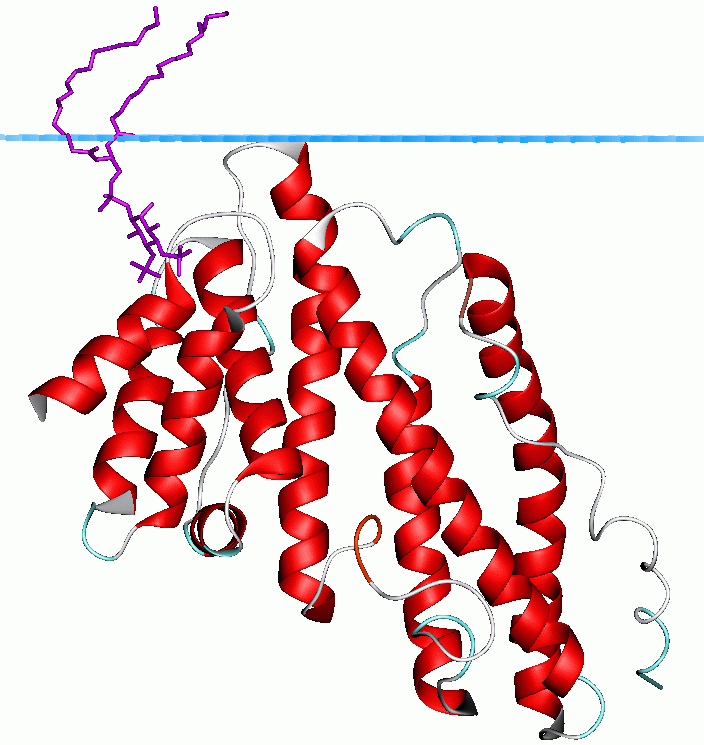
- Clathrin assembly lymphoid myeloid leukemia (CALM) protein

Identifiers
- Symbol: ANTH
- Pfam: PF07651
- InterPro: IPR011417
- OPM superfamily: 38
- OPM protein: 1hfa
- CDD: cd03564
Available protein structures:
- PDB: IPR011417 PF07651 (ECOD; PDBsum)
- AlphaFold: IPR011417; PF07651

The ANTH domain is a membrane binding domain that shows weak specificity for PtdIns(4,5)P2. It was found in AP180 (homologous to CALM) endocytotic accessory protein that has been implicated in the formation of clathrin-coated pits. The domain is involved in phosphatidylinositol 4,5-bisphosphate binding and is a universal adaptor for nucleation of clathrin coats.

Its structure is a solenoid of 9 helices. The PtdIns(4,5)P2 binding residues are spread over several helices at the tip of the structure. The PtdIns(4,5)P2 binding sequence is Kx9Kx(K/R)(H/Y).

An ANTH domain is also found in HIP1 and HIP1R, and the PtdIns(4,5)P2 binding sequence is conserved.

== Human proteins containing this domain ==
HIP1; HIP1R; PICALM; SNAP91;
