= AP2 adaptor complex =

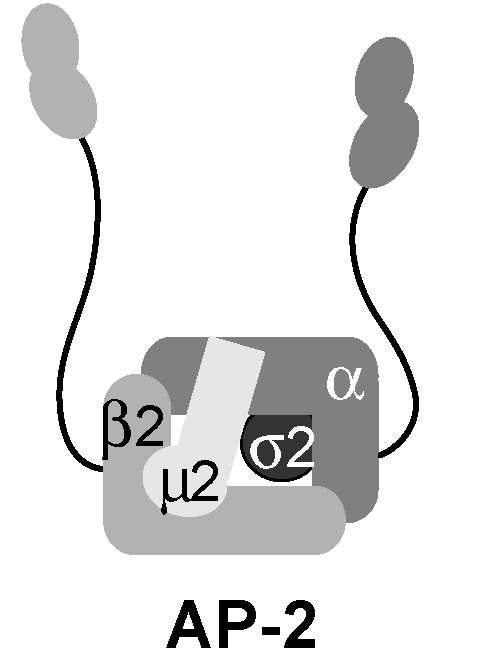
AP-2 complex

The AP2 adaptor complex is a multimeric protein that works on the cell membrane to internalize cargo in clathrin-mediated endocytosis. It is a stable complex of four adaptins which give rise to a structure that has a core domain and two appendage domains attached to the core domain by polypeptide linkers. These appendage domains are sometimes called 'ears'. The core domain binds to the membrane and to cargo destined for internalisation. The alpha and beta appendage domains bind to accessory proteins and to clathrin. Their interactions allow the temporal and spatial regulation of the assembly of clathrin-coated vesicles and their endocytosis.

The AP-2 complex is a heterotetramer consisting of two large adaptins (α and β), a medium adaptin (μ), and a small adaptin (σ):

- complex 2
  - AP2A1 (α unit 1)
  - AP2A2 (α unit 2)
  - AP2B1 (β unit)
  - AP2M1 (μ unit)
  - AP2S1 (σ unit)

== Structure ==
The AP2 adaptor complex exists in two primary conformations: the open conformation (active state) and the closed conformation (inactive state). In its active state, the clathrin binding site found on the β subunit and the cargo binding site found on the μ subunit are exposed to the cytosol, allowing their respective interactions to occur. In its inactive state, the complex experiences a conformational change that causes both sites to be covered, preventing its primary functions. The α and β heavy chains of the complex make up about 60% of the polypeptide sequence of AP2 and are tightly structured into 14 HEAT repeats which form zigzagging α-helical structures that interact with the helical "legs" of the clathrin trimer.

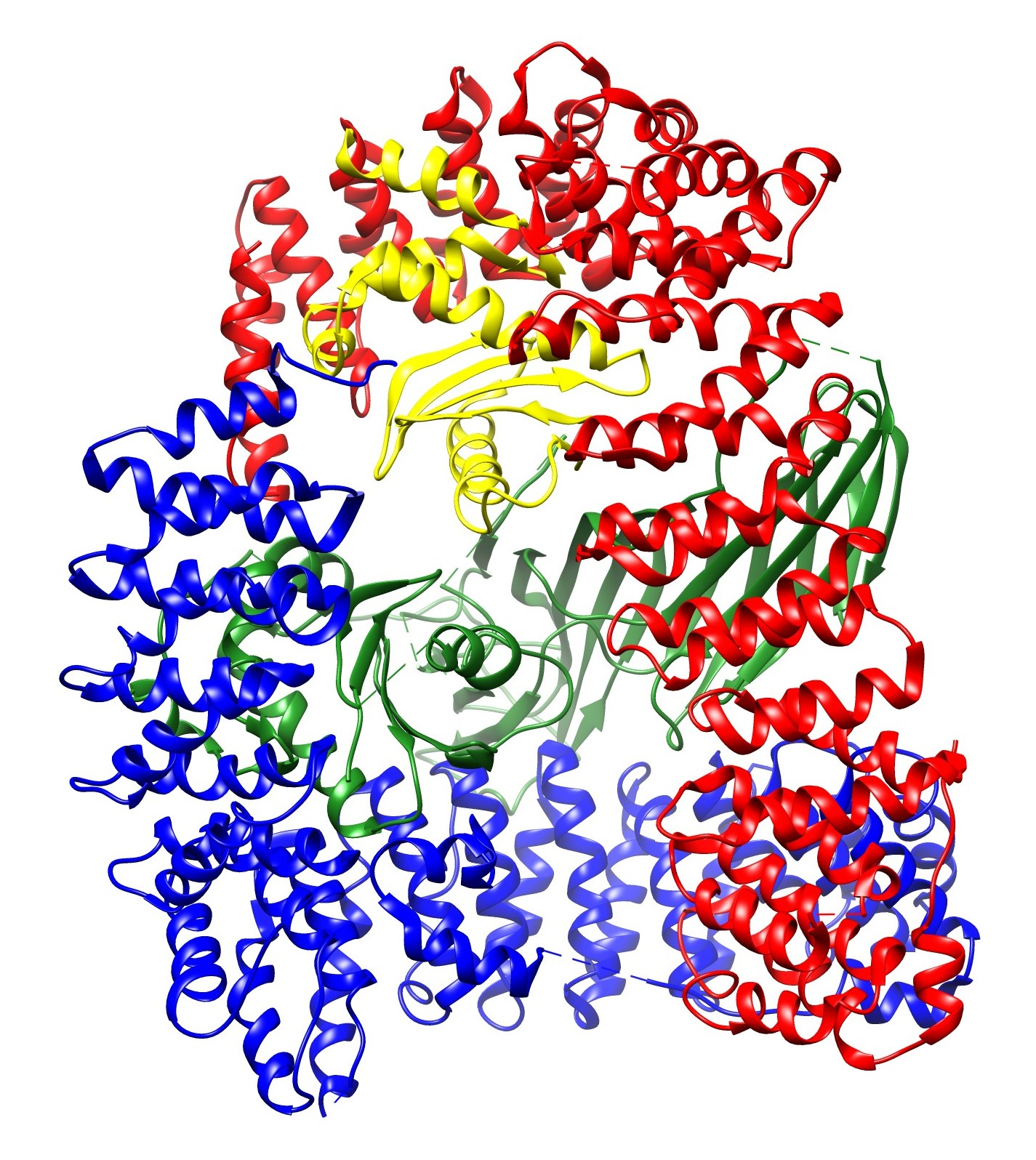
AP2 Adaptor Complex Cryo-EM Structure. Red - alpha subunits. Blue - beta subunit. Green - mu subunit. Yellow - sigma subunit.

== Function ==
AP2 facilitates the assembly of clathrin lattices when endocytosis needs to occur, by aggregating together with other AP2 complexes, in their active conformation. These AP2 aggregates interact with individual clathrin proteins by their β-active sites, orienting them into the clathrin "cages" that form the endocytic coat.

== Regulation ==
The regulation of AP2 activity is primarily done through conformational rearrangements of the structure into two distinct (and a potential third and fourth) conformations. The "open" conformation is the active state of the complex, as the "pits" or active binding sites for clathrins and the cargo are uncovered. On the other hand, the "closed" conformation is denoted by the closing or inaccessibility of these same sites.

=== Activation ===
The presence of clathrins have been found to induce binding to cargo, and similarly, presence of cargo appears to induce clathrin binding. This is thought to occur by a secondary stabilization of the complex structure, which would allow partial activation, or access, to the respective pits. Phosphatidylinositol (4,5)-bisphosphate (PIP_{2}) serves as a signal sequence that binds and is recognized by AP2. PIP_{2} can be found within liposomes containing cargo, which interact with AP2 to then bind clathrin and execute its function. In the closed form, the PIP_{2} binding site is exposed, allowing for the conformational regulation to occur. Because of this, a certain order of slight conformational changes bring about the fully open conformation, beginning with PIP_{2} binding, then cargo sequence binding, and finally clathrin binding. A family of proteins called muniscins are thought to be the primary allosteric activators of the AP2 adaptor complex, due to their prevalence in AP2 associated pits and their inhibition resulting in the decrease in AP2 mediated endocytosis. Additionally, the complex has been found to be regulated and activated by phosphorylation of its (mu) subunit.

=== Deactivation ===
Deactivation, or change into the "closed" conformation, is still unclear. NECAPs are thought the play a role in it, by binding to the α subunit of AP2. Not much is known, but the open conformation of AP2, which is phosphorylated, appears to be necessary for NECAP1 to bind within its core. The process of action is still unknown, but this interaction causes the dephosphorylation of the AP2 adaptor complex, thus deactivating it.

== Medical relevance ==
AP2 has been identified to intimately participate in autophagic cellular pathways, responsible for the degradation of aggregated protein. In fact, it's seen to complex with phosphatidylinositol clathrin assembly lymphoid-myeloid leukemia (PICALM), which would serve as an important receptor group for microtubule-associated protein 1 light chain 3 (LC3). LC3 has an important role in some autophagic pathways. Because of this, there is suspicion that AP2 deficiency or dysfunction may be a precursor for the development of familial Alzheimer's Disease.

== See also ==
- Amphiphysin
- AP180
- Epsin
- Exomer
- Muniscins
