= GGA2 =

Protein-coding gene in the species Homo sapiens

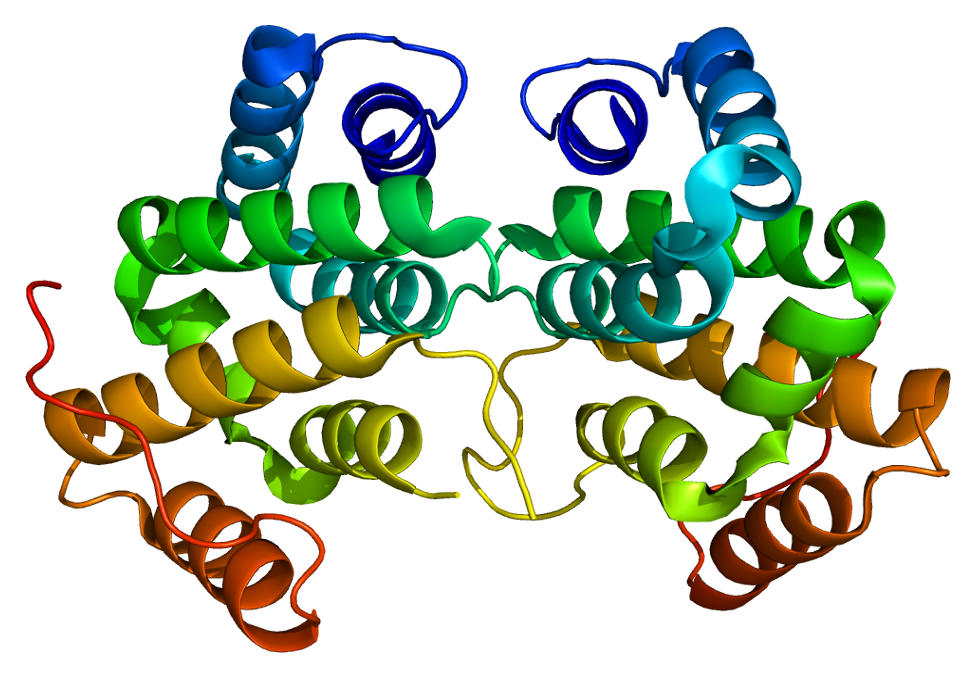

Identifiers
- Aliases: GGA2, VEAR, golgi associated, gamma adaptin ear containing, ARF binding protein 2
- External IDs: OMIM: 606005; MGI: 1921355; GeneCards: GGA2
Available structures
PDB	Ortholog search: PDBe RCSB
PDB	List of PDB id codes 1MHQ

Gene location (Human)
Chr.	Chromosome 16 (human)
Band	16p12.2	Start	23,463,542 bp
Band	16p12.2	End	23,521,995 bp

Gene location (Mouse)
Chr.	Chromosome 7 (mouse)
Band	7|7 F2	Start	121,585,945 bp
Band	7|7 F2	End	121,620,445 bp
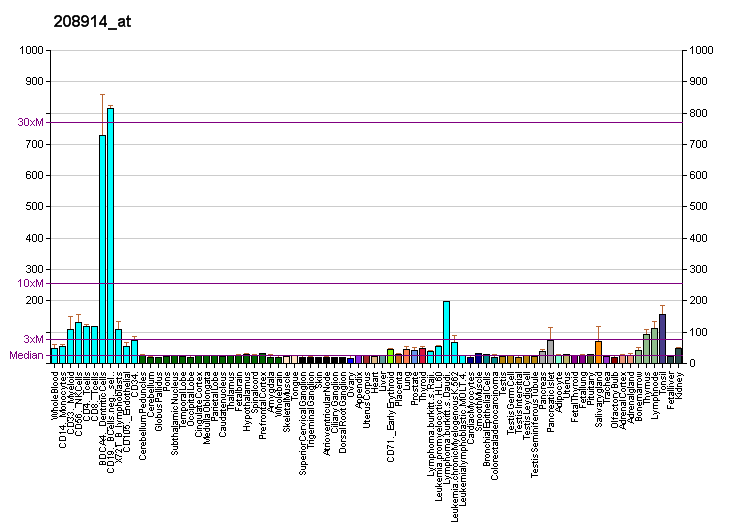

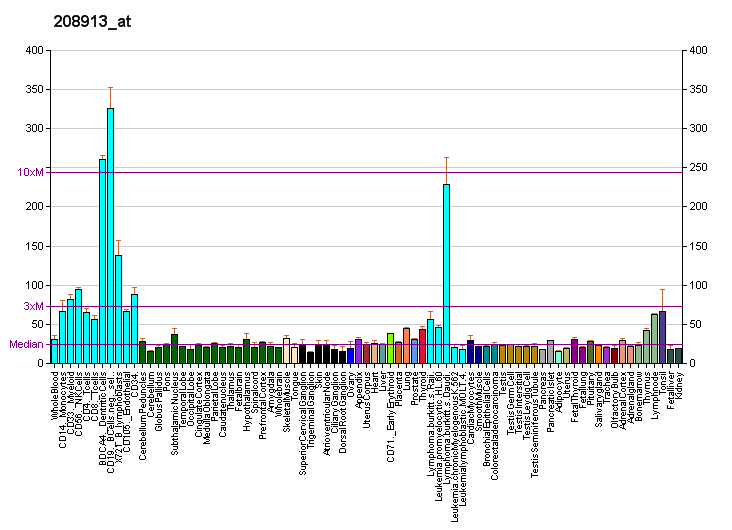

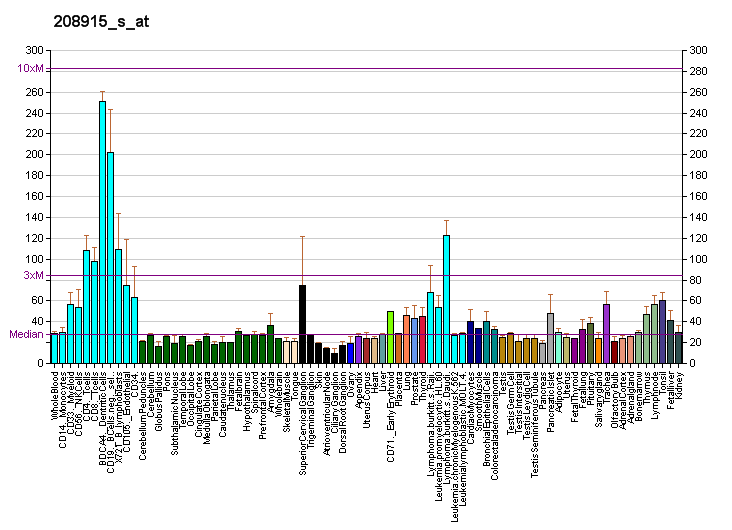
RNA expression pattern
Bgee	Human / Mouse (ortholog); Top expressed in: body of pancreas; tendon of biceps brachii; right lobe of thyroid gland; tonsil; left lobe of thyroid gland; lymph node; left ovary; right ovary; right hemisphere of cerebellum; right adrenal cortex / Top expressed in: otic placode; yolk sac; saccule; otic vesicle; primitive streak; epithelium of stomach; molar; epiblast; transitional epithelium of urinary bladder; medullary collecting duct; More reference expression data
BioGPS	More reference expression data
Gene ontology
Molecular function	protein binding
Cellular component	endosome; trans-Golgi network; Golgi apparatus; endosome membrane; intracellular anatomical structure; membrane; clathrin-coated vesicle; clathrin adaptor complex; early endosome membrane
Biological process	protein transport; intracellular protein transport; vesicle-mediated transport; protein localization to cell surface; Golgi to plasma membrane protein transport
Sources:Amigo / QuickGO
Orthologs
Databases	NCBI: entry; OMA: entry
Species	Human	Mouse
Entrez	23062	74105
Ensembl	ENSG00000103365	ENSMUSG00000030872
UniProt	Q9UJY4	Q6P5E6
RefSeq (mRNA)	NM_015044; NM_138640	NM_028758
RefSeq (protein)	NP_055859	NP_083034
Location (UCSC)	Chr 16: 23.46 – 23.52 Mb	Chr 7: 121.59 – 121.62 Mb
PubMed search
- Wikidata
View/Edit Human	View/Edit Mouse

ADP-ribosylation factor-binding protein GGA2 is a protein that in humans is encoded by the GGA2 gene.

== Function ==
This gene encodes a member of the Golgi-localized, gamma adaptin ear-containing, ARF-binding (GGA) family. This family includes ubiquitous coat proteins that regulate the trafficking of proteins between the trans-Golgi network and the lysosome. These proteins share an amino-terminal VHS domain which mediates sorting of the mannose 6-phosphate receptors at the trans-Golgi network. They also contain a carboxy-terminal region with homology to the ear domain of gamma-adaptins. This family member may play a significant role in cargo molecules regulation and clathrin-coated vesicle assembly.

== Interactions ==
GGA2 has been shown to interact with RABEP1, Sortilin 1, BACE2 and CLINT1.
