= Exomer =

Protein complex transporting molecules inside the cell

Exomer is a heterotetrameric protein complex similar to COPI and other adaptins. It was first described in the yeast Saccharomyces cerevisiae. Exomer is a cargo adaptor important in transporting molecules from the Golgi apparatus toward the cell membrane. The vesicles it is found on are different from COPI vesicles in that they do not appear to have a "coat" or "scaffold" around them.

An overview of the cellular localization of exomer and other cargo adaptors is shown here. Exomer binds to 2 molecules of ADP-ribosylation factor 1 (Arf1) as shown in this figure. A hinge region of exomer is thought to be important for forming to a highly curved membrane vesicle as shown in this figure. The steps of assembly of exomer on a Golgi membrane are shown in this figure.

== See also ==
- AP2 adaptor complex
- Clathrin vesicles
- COPII vesicles
