= Mark Bretscher =

British scientist

Mark S. Bretscher
- Born: 8 January 1940; Cambridge

Mark Steven Bretscher (born 8 January 1940) is a British biological scientist and Fellow of the Royal Society. He worked at the Medical Research Council Laboratory of Molecular Biology in Cambridge, United Kingdom and is currently retired.

== Education ==
Mark Bretscher was born in Cambridge and educated at Abingdon School from 1950 to 1958. He then went to Gonville and Caius College, Cambridge, in 1958 to study Chemistry where he gained a PhD and became a Research Fellow.

== Career ==
In 1961 he joined the MRC Unit for the Study of the Molecular Structure of Biological Systems in the Cavendish laboratory as a graduate student with Francis Crick and Sydney Brenner and then spent a year as a Jane Coffin Childs Fellow with Paul Berg at Stanford (1964-5). He joined the staff of the MRC Laboratory of Molecular Biology in Cambridge, becoming Head of the Division of Cell Biology (1986-1995) and Emeritus scientist (2005-2013). He was a visiting professor in biochemistry and molecular biology at Harvard University (1974–75) and Eleanor Roosevelt Cancer Society Fellow and visiting professor, Stanford University (1984–85). He was elected a Fellow of the Royal Society in 1985.

Bretscher's main contributions lie in the areas of the mechanism of protein biosynthesis, the structure of cell membranes (especially that of the human red blood cell) and animal cell migration.

Protein Synthesis

In his first paper, on the genetic code, the word "codon" first appeared in print (inserted by Francis Crick). Bretscher later showed that the growing polypeptide chain is attached to one of the hydroxyl groups of the terminal adenosine residue of tRNA. With Kjeld Marcker he found that the initiator methionine tRNA binds directly to the peptide (P) site on the ribosome and that protein synthesis can start on a circular messenger, showing that during initiation a ribosome does not need an end: the correct initiator AUG is not found by starting at one end of the mRNA and then selecting the first AUG. He proposed that, during translocation, the two ribosomal subunits move with respect to each other, resulting in a hybrid site P/A site; this suggested that the movement of the peptidyl-tRNA and bound mRNA from the A site to the P site occurs in two steps.

Cell membranes

Using a novel labelling agent, he showed that human erythrocytes have just two major proteins exposed on their outer surfaces (now known as the anion channel and glycophorin) and that both span the lipid bilayer with a unique orientation, the first proteins shown to span the membrane. He also discovered that the amino phospholipids, phosphatidylethanolamine and phosphatidylserine, are inaccessible from outside the cell and proposed therefore that the bilayer is asymmetrical — with choline lipids forming the outer monolayer and the amino lipids the cytoplasmic monolayer. He suggested that this asymmetry arises during membrane biosynthesis, proposing that all these lipids are made on the cytoplasmic face of the bilayer, but choline lipids are subsequently moved by a hypothetical lipid translocase to the outer monolayer which he named a "flippase".

With Munro, he proposed that the Golgi apparatus concentrates cholesterol away from the cis-side of the Golgi towards the trans-side. This helps keep the level of cholesterol at a high level in the plasma membrane, making it a better barrier for the cell. The presence of cholesterol makes a bilayer thicker: the increasing thickness of the membrane from cis- to trans- leads to a filtration of only those proteins having a long enough transmembrane domain to advance to the cell surface. This is a novel form of protein sorting.

Cell Movement

He is the principal protagonist of the membrane flow scheme for cell locomotion, which is largely based on how cap formation occurs and the movement of carbon particles on the surfaces of migrating fibroblasts studied by Michael Abercrombie. Abercrombie suggested his particle movement reflected motion of the surface from the cell's front to its rear, and that the front was extended by addition of membrane there from internal stores. Most mammalian cells continuously circulate their surface membrane in a process driven by the endocytic cycle. Clathrin coated pits in the plasma membrane bud a segment of the surface into the cell; this membrane is processed through various intracellular compartments and then returned to the cell surface. When cells move — a process called amoeboid movement — the cell's front is extended ahead of the cell and the rear end of the cell is then brought forward. Bretscher extended Abercrombie's view that the cell's leading edge is extended by the addition of intracellular membrane to it by exocytosis and this membrane is retrieved, by endocytosis, from regions of the cell surface nearer the cell's rear. This circulating membrane is restricted to a few proteins (mainly receptors which bring nutrients, such as LDL or transferrin) into the cell and lipids. In this way, a polarised endocytic cycle is set up, one leg of it being in the cell's surface, the other its transit through the cell: this spatial separation in the cell's surface between the sites of exocytosis (the front) and the sites of endocytosis (further back) causes a flow of membrane from the cell's front towards its rear. For many purposes, this flow can be thought of as a "lipid flow": it causes large aggregates on the cell surface, such as attached carbon particles, cross-linked surface proteins or cross-linked lipids to be swept towards the back of the cell. However, surface proteins which have not been cross-linked would also tend to be swept backwards, but their distribution on the cell surface is approximately randomized by Brownian motion. He showed that addition of recycling membrane on moving cells occurs at the cell's leading edge. He suggested that the role of the cytoskeleton in this process is to transport intracellular membrane to the front of the cell and to help structure the newly exocytosed membrane at the cell's front. In this view, the cell is somewhat like a tank, the surface attached to the substrate acting as a tread to move the cell forward. The feet of the cell (usually integrins) also circulate to provide fresh attachments for the cell's front.

The rate of membrane circulation about matches that needed to move the cell forwards; studies with Dictyostelium discoideum amoebae show that, in this fast moving (about 15μm/min) cell, they internalise their entire surface once about each 6 mins. Furthermore, ts mutants in NSF, a protein required for membrane fusion, stop moving at the restrictive temperature. Strikingly, both Dictyostelium amoebae and neutrophils can chemotax towards a target whilst in suspension, showing that a solid substrate is not required for movement; this provides strong evidence that these cells move by a flowing membrane.

== Family ==
His father was Egon Bretscher, the nuclear physicist. He is married to Barbara Pearse and his brothers are Anthony Bretscher and Peter Bretscher. He lists his hobbies as "walking, creating wild environments, early English portraits and furniture."

== Books containing references to Mark Bretscher ==
- John Finch; 'A Nobel Fellow On Every Floor', Medical Research Council 2008, 381 pp, ISBN 978-1-84046-940-0; this book is all about the MRC Laboratory of Molecular Biology, Cambridge.
- Robert Olby; 'Francis Crick: Hunter of Life's secrets', Cold Spring Harbor Laboratory Press 2009, 537pp, ISBN 978-0-87969-798-3.
- Matt Ridley; 'Francis Crick: Discoverer of the Genetic Code', HarperCollins 2006, 224pp, ISBN 978-0-06-082333-7.
- Frank Close; 'Half-Life; The Divided Life of Bruno Pontecorvo, Physicist or Spy', Basic Books 2015, ISBN 978-0-465-06998-9.
- Paul Broda; 'Scientist Spies; A Memoir of My Three Parents and the Atom Bomb', Troubador Publishing Ltd 2011, ISBN 9781848766075.
- Paul Wassarman; 'A Place in History; The Biography of John C. Kendrew', Oxford University Press 2020, ISBN 978-0-19-973204-3
- Kathleen Weston; 'Ahead of the Curve; Women Scientists at the MRC Laboratory of Molecular Biology' Toucan Books Ltd 2020,

== See also ==
- List of Old Abingdonians
- ISBN 978-1-903435-05-2
