= Barbara Pearse =

British biological scientist

- Born: Barbara Mary Frances Pearse; 24 March 1948 (age 78)
- Spouse: Mark Bretscher
- Awards: FRS; EMBO Gold Medal (1987)
- Scientific career
- Workplaces: MRC Laboratory of Molecular Biology

Barbara Mary Frances Pearse FRS (born 24 March 1948, Wraysbury, Buckinghamshire, England) is a British biological scientist. She works at the Medical Research Council Laboratory of Molecular Biology in Cambridge, United Kingdom.

== Education ==
Barbara Pearse attended the independent Lady Eleanor Holles School in Hampton in Greater London, and gained her undergraduate degree from University College London in 1969.

== Career ==
She was appointed to the scientific staff of the MRC Laboratory of Molecular Biology in 1982.

== Research ==
Pearse's main contributions lie in the structure of coated vesicles. Pearse first purified coated vesicles; she also discovered the clathrin coat molecule in 1975. Coated pits and vesicles were first seen in thin sections of tissue in the electron microscope by Thomas Roth and Keith Porter in 1964. The importance of them for the clearance of LDL from blood was discovered by R. G. Anderson, Michael S. Brown and Joseph L. Goldstein in 1976.

== Awards and honours ==
She was visiting professor in cell biology at Stanford University (1984–5). She was elected a member of European Molecular Biology Organization (EMBO) in 1982 and awarded the EMBO Gold Medal in 1987. She was elected a Fellow of the Royal Society in 1988.

== Personal life ==
She is married to Mark Bretscher, another scientist.
