= Beta-secretase 2 =

Enzyme found in humans

BACE2
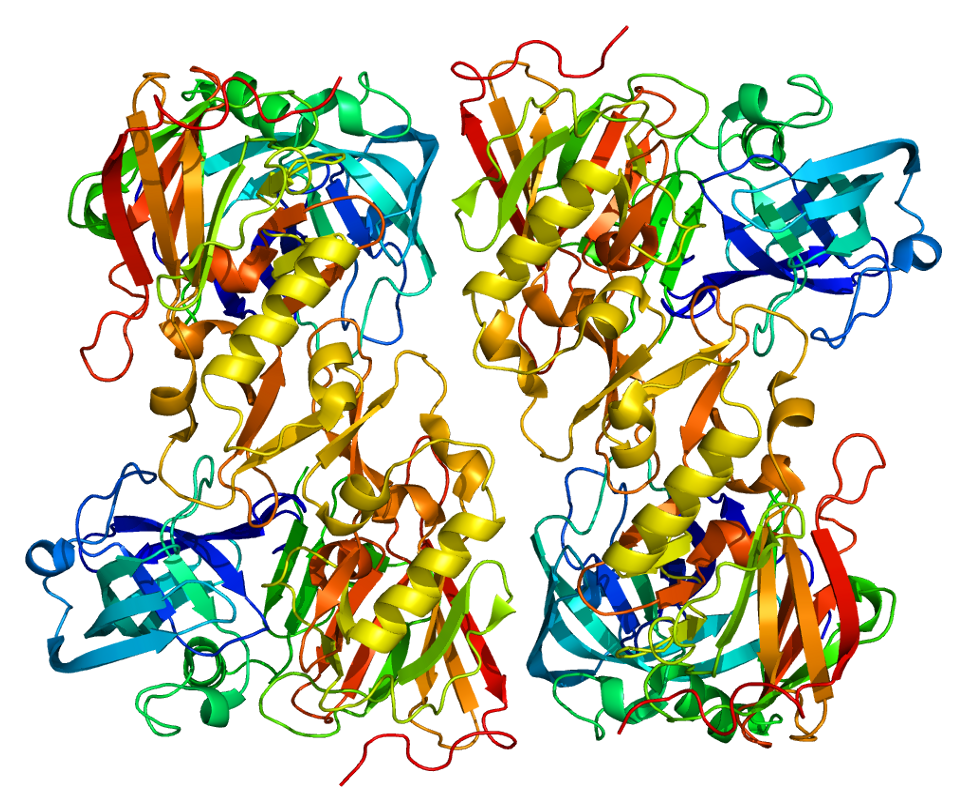

Identifiers
- Aliases: BACE2, AEPLC, ALP56, ASP1, ASP21, BAE2, CDA13, CEAP1, DRAP, beta-site APP-cleaving enzyme 2, beta-secretase 2
- External IDs: OMIM: 605668; MGI: 1860440; GeneCards: BACE2
Available structures
| PDB | Ortholog search: PDBe RCSB |
| PDB | List of PDB id codes 2EWY, 3ZKG, 3ZKI, 3ZKM, 3ZKN, 3ZKQ, 3ZKS, 3ZKX, 3ZL7, 3ZLQ, 4BEL, 4BFB |
Enzyme activity
| EC # | BRENDA | ExPASy | KEGG | MetaCyc |
|---|---|---|---|---|
| 3.4.23.45 | ↗ | ↗ | ↗ | ↗ |

Gene location (Human)
| Chr. | Chromosome 21 (human) |
| Band | 21q22.2-q22.3 | Start | 41,167,801 bp |
| Band | 21q22.2-q22.3 | End | 41,282,530 bp |

Gene location (Mouse)
| Chr. | Chromosome 16 (mouse) |
| Band | 16|16 C4 | Start | 97,157,942 bp |
| Band | 16|16 C4 | End | 97,244,136 bp |
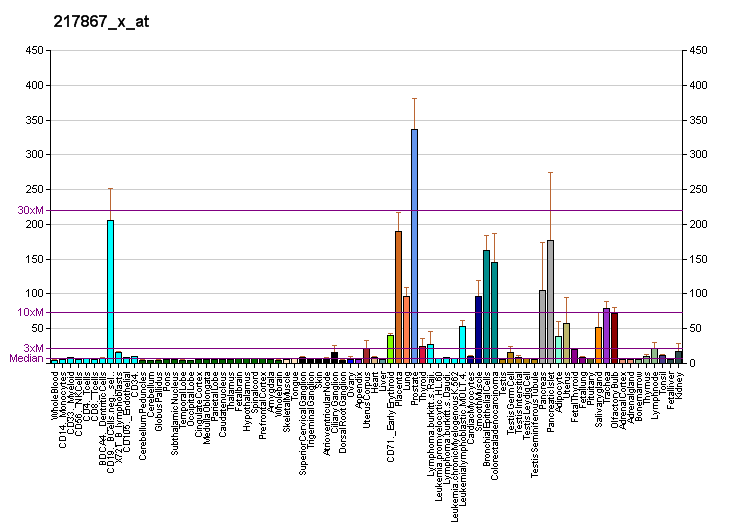
RNA expression pattern
| Bgee | Human / Mouse (ortholog); Top expressed in: parotid gland; gallbladder; pancreatic ductal cell; minor salivary glands; renal medulla; islet of Langerhans; pylorus; ascending aorta; Descending thoracic aorta; saphenous vein / Top expressed in: pyloric antrum; epithelium of stomach; transitional epithelium of urinary bladder; islet of Langerhans; iris; mucous cell of stomach; sciatic nerve; conjunctival fornix; aortic valve; stria vascularis; More reference expression data |
| BioGPS | More reference expression data |
Gene ontology
| Molecular function | peptidase activity; amyloid-beta binding; hydrolase activity; aspartic-type endopeptidase activity |
| Cellular component | integral component of membrane; cell surface; endosome; Golgi apparatus; endoplasmic reticulum; membrane; plasma membrane; cytoplasm; trans-Golgi network; dense core granule |
| Biological process | peptide hormone processing; protein catabolic process; amyloid-beta metabolic process; negative regulation of amyloid precursor protein biosynthetic process; proteolysis; membrane protein ectodomain proteolysis; astrocyte activation; glucose homeostasis |
Sources:Amigo / QuickGO
Orthologs
| Databases | NCBI: entry; OMA: entry |
| Species | Human | Mouse |
| Entrez | 25825 | 56175 |
| Ensembl | ENSG00000182240 | ENSMUSG00000040605 |
| UniProt | Q9Y5Z0 | Q9JL18 |
| RefSeq (mRNA) | NM_138992; NM_012105; NM_138991 | NM_019517 |
| RefSeq (protein) | NP_036237; NP_620476; NP_620477 | NP_062390 |
| Location (UCSC) | Chr 21: 41.17 – 41.28 Mb | Chr 16: 97.16 – 97.24 Mb |
| PubMed search |
- Wikidata
| View/Edit Human | View/Edit Mouse |

Beta-secretase 2 (EC 3.4.23.45, also known as memapsin-1) is an enzyme that cleaves Glu-Val-Asn-Leu-|-Asp-Ala-Glu-Phe in the Swedish variant of Alzheimer's amyloid precursor protein. BACE2 is a close homolog of BACE1.

== Gene ==
This gene is located in the "Down critical region" of chromosome 21, which has been implicated in the pathogenesis of Down syndrome. Three transcript variants encoding different isoforms have been described for this gene.

== Function ==
The protein encoded by this gene is a member of the peptidase A1 family, and functions as a type I integral membrane glycoprotein and aspartic protease. It is involved in the proteolytic cleavage of amyloid precursor protein (APP), a key step in the production of amyloid beta peptide. Cerebral deposition of amyloid beta peptide is an early and critical feature of Alzheimer's disease and a common complication in Down syndrome.

BACE2 has also been identified as the primary protease responsible for the release of the amyloidogenic ectodomain of Pmel17 in melanocytes, a process essential for the formation of the melanosome amyloid matrix.

== Clinical significance ==
BACE2 has been implicated in the maintenance of pancreatic β cells and regulation of glucose homeostasis. In mouse models, higher BACE2 activity has been associated with improved pancreatic function, suggesting potential therapeutic relevance for Type 2 Diabetes research. In a separate context, a homozygous 25-base pair deletion in the BACE2 gene has been linked to the unique brown-and-white coat coloration in some giant pandas, as opposed to the typical black-and-white phenotype observed in the wild type.

== Interactions ==
BACE2 has been shown to interact with GGA1 and GGA2.
