= Egon Bretscher =

Swiss-born British chemist and physicist (1901–1973)

Egon Bretscher CBE
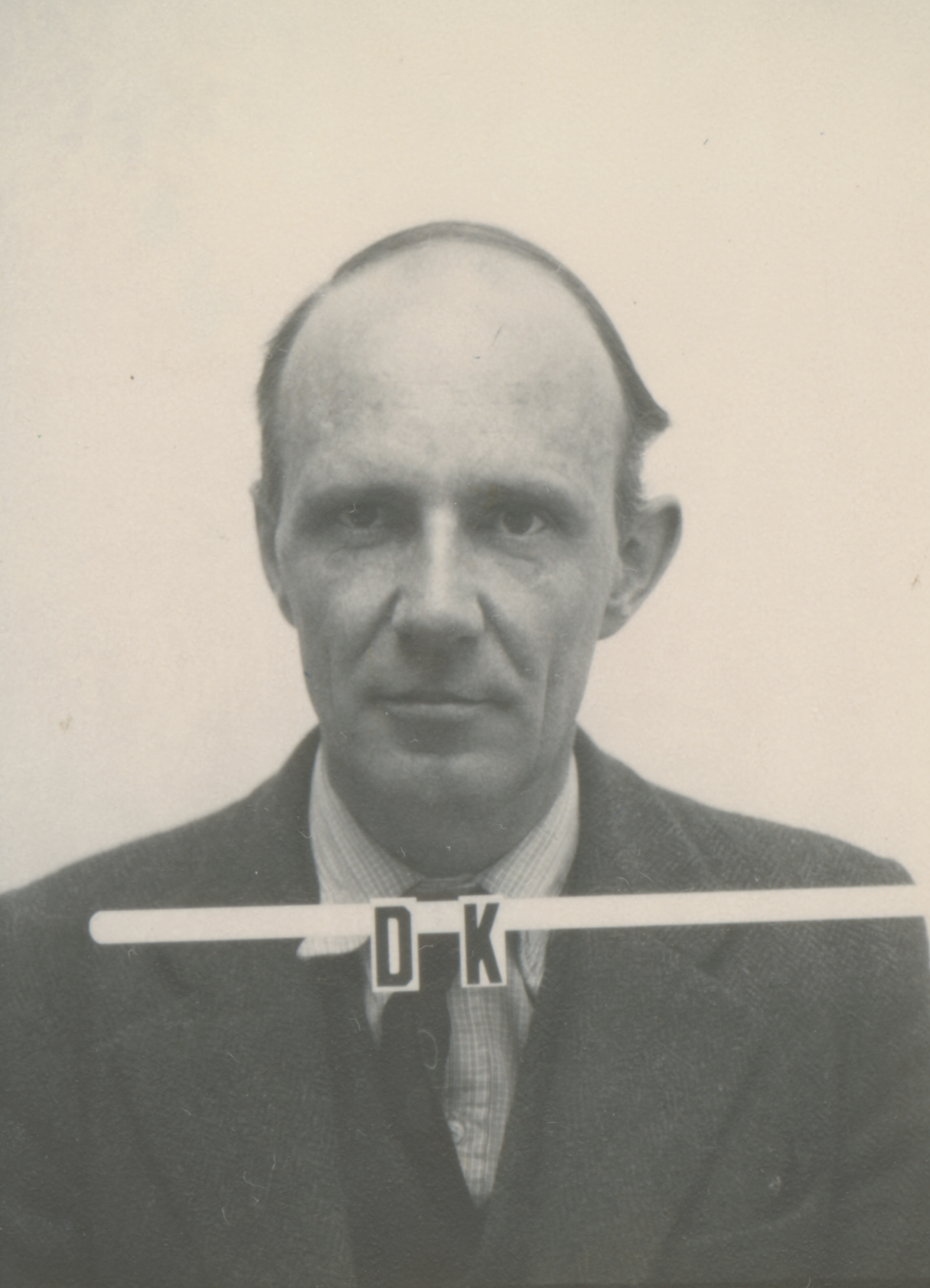
- Bretscher's Los Alamos Laboratory identity badge photo
- Born: 23 May 1901; Zurich, Switzerland
- Died: 16 April 1973 (aged 71); Zurich, Switzerland
- Education: Eidgenössische Technische Hochschule; University of Edinburgh
- Spouse: Hanna Greminger (m. 1931)
- Children: 5, including Mark and Anthony
- Scientific career
- Workplaces: Cavendish Laboratory; Los Alamos Laboratory; Atomic Energy Research Establishment

Egon Bretscher CBE (23 May 1901 – 16 April 1973) was a Swiss-born British chemist and nuclear physicist and Head of the Nuclear Physics Division from 1948 to 1966 at the Atomic Energy Research Establishment, also known as Harwell Laboratory, in Harwell, United Kingdom. He was one of the pioneers in nuclear fission research and one of the first to foresee that plutonium could be used as an energy source. His work on nuclear physics led to his involvement in the British atomic bomb research project Tube Alloys and his membership of the British Mission to the Manhattan Project at Los Alamos, where he worked in Enrico Fermi's Advanced Development Division in the F-3 Super Experimentation group. His contributions up to 1945 are discussed by Margaret Gowing in her "Britain and Atomic Energy, 1935-1945."

== Early life ==
Born in Zurich, Switzerland and educated at the Eidgenössische Technische Hochschule (ETH) there, Bretscher gained a PhD degree in organic chemistry at Edinburgh in 1926. He returned to Zurich as privat docent to Peter Debye, later moving in 1936 to work in Rutherford’s laboratory at the Cavendish in Cambridge as a Rockefeller Scholar. Here he switched to research in nuclear physics, proposing (with Norman Feather) in 1940 that the 239 isotope of element 94 could be produced from the common isotope of uranium-238 by neutron capture and that, like U-235, this should be able to sustain a nuclear chain reaction. A similar conclusion was independently arrived at by Edwin McMillan and Philip Abelson at Berkeley Radiation Laboratory. In addition, he devised theoretical chemical procedures for purifying this unknown element away from the parent uranium; this element was named plutonium by Nicholas Kemmer.

Bretscher used to joke that his main contribution to physics occurred in the summer of 1930, when he was climbing in the Bergell region near Engadin with another student, Felix Bloch, in the Swiss Alps. Bloch slipped over an icy edge but was saved, as he fell, by the rope joining him to Bretscher. The latter's swift action in driving his ice axe into the ice prevented their combined demise. After raising the alarm, Bretscher returned with a guide and spent the night with Bloch discussing physics. It took guides a further three days to bring Bloch down. Bloch later won the Nobel Prize for physics for his discovery of nuclear magnetic resonance.

== Manhattan Project ==
In 1944 he became a part of the British Mission to the Manhattan Project in Los Alamos, New Mexico led by James Chadwick, where he made the first measurements on the energy released in fusion processes. In 1946 in measuring deuterium-tritium (D-T) fusion cross-sections at different energies, he and Anthony French discovered a resonance in the helium-5 nucleus briefly produced during the ^{2}H(t,n)^{4}He reaction. This resonance makes the D-T recipe for fusion a lower energy option than D-D by a factor of approximately 100, making D-T fusion an accessible approach for the fusion bomb and efforts towards modern fusion energy reactors. This resonance was dubbed the "Bretscher state" in 2024. It also explains the preponderance of Helium in the universe, and is crucial for the existence of significant quantities of 12C, on which known lifeforms are based.

During his time in Los Alamos, he took many Kodachrome slides which appear to constitute a unique coloured record of that research site. His pictures, which are now held by the Churchill Archives Centre, include photographs of Enrico Fermi, Edward Teller and the Trinity site in New Mexico after the first atomic bomb was detonated, showing the surface light brown sand turned to a green-blue glass.

== Harwell Laboratory ==
In 1947 he was invited by John Cockcroft to head the Chemistry Division at the newly established Atomic Energy Research Establishment at Harwell, Oxfordshire, England and in 1948 succeeded Otto Frisch as head of the Nuclear Physics Division there. Amongst his colleagues were Bruno Pontecorvo in the Nuclear Physics Division, and Klaus Fuchs who was the head of the Theoretical Physics Division. He was appointed a Commander of the Most Excellent Order (CBE) on retirement from Harwell.

Bretscher died 16 April 1973 in Zurich, Switzerland. Of his two daughters and three sons, Scilla Senior was a computer programmer, Mark Bretscher and Anthony Bretscher are cell biologists, whilst Peter Bretscher is an immunologist.
