= CLINT1 =

Protein-coding gene in the species Homo sapiens

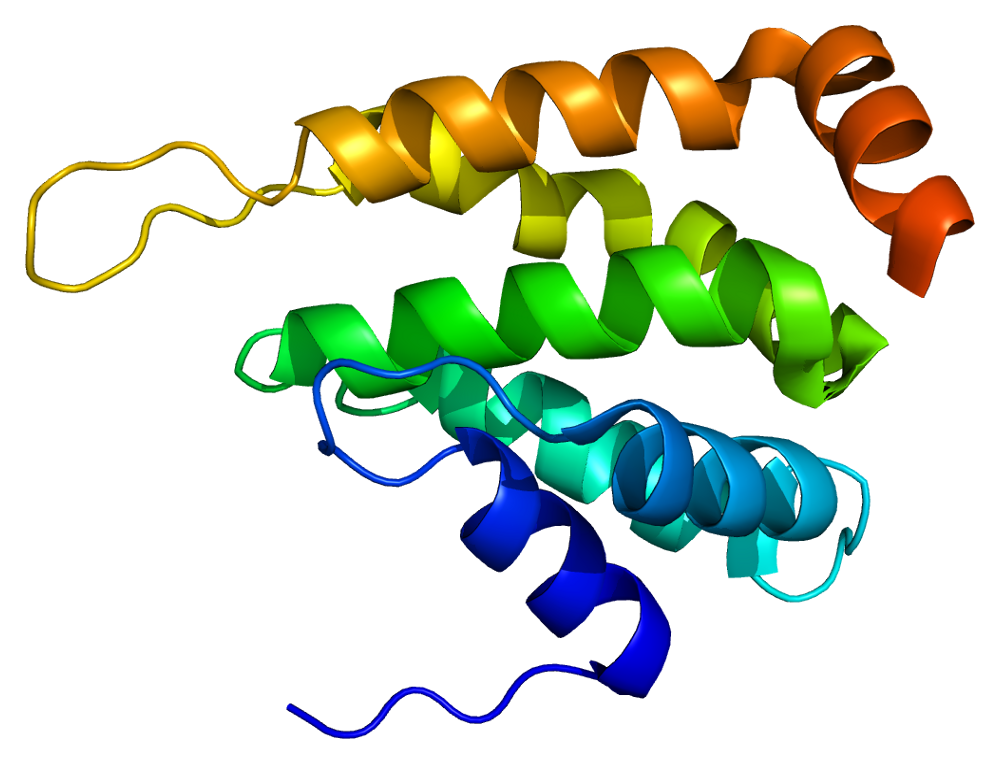
Available structures
PDB	Ortholog search: PDBe RCSB
PDB	List of PDB id codes 1XGW, 2QY7, 2V8S

Identifiers
- Aliases: CLINT1, CLINT, ENTH, EPN4, EPNR, clathrin interactor 1
- External IDs: OMIM: 607265; MGI: 2144243; HomoloGene: 133740; GeneCards: CLINT1; OMA:CLINT1 - orthologs

Gene location (Human)
Chr.	Chromosome 5 (human)
Band	5q33.3	Start	157,785,743 bp
Band	5q33.3	End	157,859,145 bp

Gene location (Mouse)
Chr.	Chromosome 11 (mouse)
Band	11|11 B1.1	Start	45,742,791 bp
Band	11|11 B1.1	End	45,801,452 bp
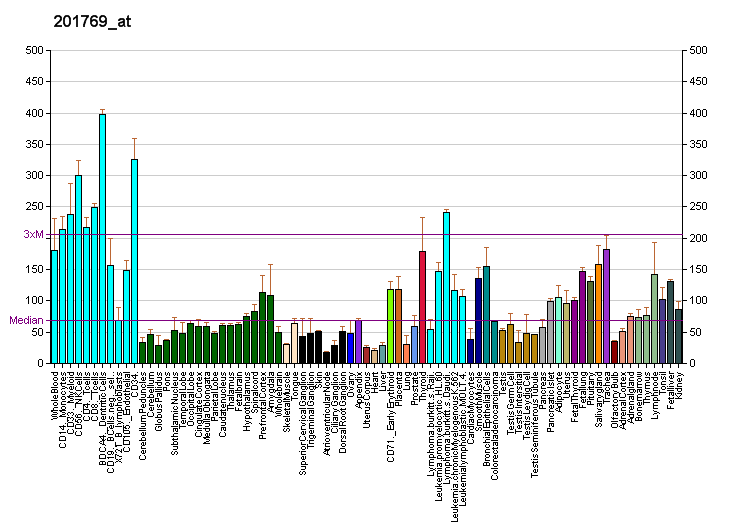

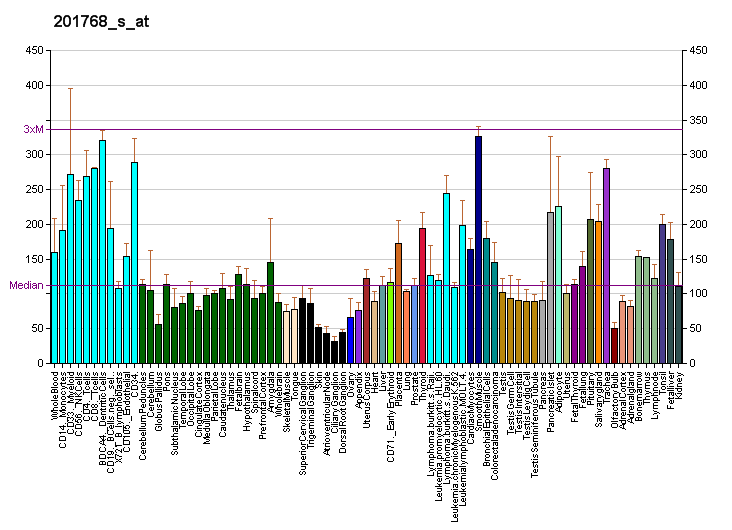
RNA expression pattern
Bgee	Human / Mouse (ortholog); Top expressed in: palpebral conjunctiva; corpus epididymis; bronchial epithelial cell; epithelium of nasopharynx; gingival epithelium; Epithelium of choroid plexus; gallbladder; caput epididymis; human penis; tibia / Top expressed in: epithelium of small intestine; seminal vesicula; conjunctival fornix; interventricular septum; lobe of prostate; migratory enteric neural crest cell; vestibular sensory epithelium; calvaria; submandibular gland; gastrula; More reference expression data
BioGPS	More reference expression data
Gene ontology
Molecular function	protein binding; lipid binding; clathrin binding; cadherin binding
Cellular component	cytoplasm; perinuclear region of cytoplasm; cytosol; Golgi apparatus; membrane; intracellular membrane-bounded organelle; clathrin-coated vesicle; cytoplasmic vesicle; nucleoplasm
Biological process	endocytosis; vesicle-mediated transport; clathrin coat assembly
Sources:Amigo / QuickGO
Orthologs
Species	Human	Mouse
Entrez	9685	216705
Ensembl	ENSG00000113282	ENSMUSG00000006169
UniProt	Q14677	Q99KN9
RefSeq (mRNA)	NM_001195555; NM_001195556; NM_014666	NM_001045520; NM_001346760; NM_001363484
RefSeq (protein)	NP_001182484; NP_001182485; NP_055481	n/a
Location (UCSC)	Chr 5: 157.79 – 157.86 Mb	Chr 11: 45.74 – 45.8 Mb
PubMed search
- Wikidata
View/Edit Human	View/Edit Mouse

Clathrin interactor 1 (CLINT1), also known as EPSIN4, is a protein which in humans is encoded by the CLINT1 gene.

== Function ==
The CLINT1 protein binds to the terminal domain of the clathrin heavy chain and stimulates clathrin cage vesicle assembly. Clathrin coated vesicles enable neurotransmitter receptors and other proteins to be endocytosed or taken up across neuronal membranes and across the membranes of other types of cells. This enables a turnover of neuroreceptors or other proteins to be maintained and thus the numbers of receptors can be fine tuned.

== Clinical significance ==
The CLINT1 gene has been shown to be involved in the genetic aetiology of schizophrenia in four studies It is known that the antipsychotic drugs chlorpromazine and clozapine stabilise clathrin coated vesicles and this may be one reason why antipsychotic drugs are effective in treating delusions, auditory hallucinations and many of the other symptoms of schizophrenia.

== Interactions ==
CLINT1 has been shown to interact with GGA2.
