= EPN2 =

Protein-coding gene in the species Homo sapiens

Identifiers
- Aliases: EPN2, EHB21, epsin 2
- External IDs: OMIM: 607263; MGI: 1333766; GeneCards: EPN2

Gene location (Human)
Chr.	Chromosome 17 (human)
Band	17p11.2	Start	19,215,615 bp
Band	17p11.2	End	19,336,715 bp

Gene location (Mouse)
Chr.	Chromosome 11 (mouse)
Band	11|11 B2	Start	61,517,249 bp
Band	11|11 B2	End	61,579,687 bp
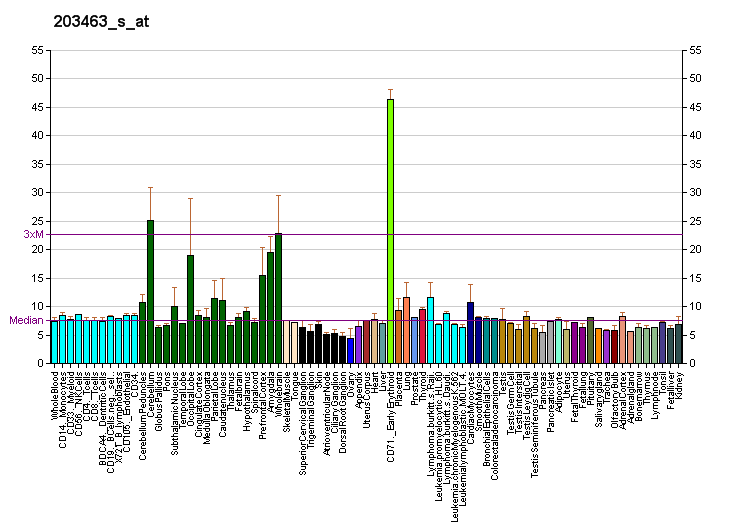

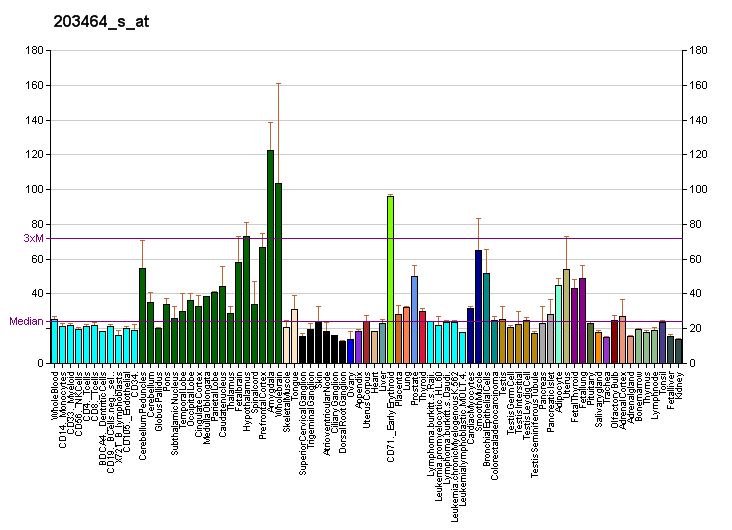
RNA expression pattern
Bgee	Human / Mouse (ortholog); Top expressed in: epithelium of colon; corpus callosum; amygdala; C1 segment; skin of abdomen; skin of leg; sural nerve; ectocervix; prefrontal cortex; cingulate gyrus / Top expressed in: zygote; secondary oocyte; primary oocyte; perirhinal cortex; entorhinal cortex; CA3 field; dentate gyrus of hippocampal formation granule cell; primary visual cortex; spermatocyte; superior frontal gyrus; More reference expression data
BioGPS	More reference expression data
Gene ontology
Molecular function	protein binding; lipid binding; cadherin binding
Cellular component	cytoplasm; intracellular membrane-bounded organelle; cytoplasmic vesicle; clathrin-coated vesicle; clathrin coat of endocytic vesicle; cytosol
Biological process	endocytosis; membrane organization; negative regulation of vascular endothelial growth factor receptor signaling pathway; positive regulation of Notch signaling pathway; negative regulation of sprouting angiogenesis
Sources:Amigo / QuickGO
Orthologs
Databases	NCBI: entry; OMA: entry
Species	Human	Mouse
Entrez	22905	13855
Ensembl	ENSG00000072134	ENSMUSG00000001036
UniProt	O95208	Q8CHU3
RefSeq (mRNA)	NM_148921; NM_001102664; NM_014964	NM_001252188; NM_001252189; NM_010148; NM_001362585; NM_001362586 NM_001362587
RefSeq (protein)	NP_001096134; NP_055779; NP_683723	NP_001239117; NP_001239118; NP_034278; NP_001349514; NP_001349515 NP_001349516
Location (UCSC)	Chr 17: 19.22 – 19.34 Mb	Chr 11: 61.52 – 61.58 Mb
PubMed search
- Wikidata
View/Edit Human	View/Edit Mouse

Epsin-2 is a protein that in humans is encoded by the EPN2 gene.

This gene encodes a protein which interacts with clathrin and adaptor-related protein complex 2, alpha 1 subunit. The protein is found in a brain-derived clathrin-coated vesicle fraction and localizes to the peri-Golgi region and the cell periphery. The protein is thought to be involved in clathrin-mediated endocytosis. Alternate splicing of this gene results in two transcript variants encoding different isoforms.
