= FCHO1 =

Protein-coding gene in the species Homo sapiens

Identifiers
- Aliases: FCHO1, FCH domain only 1, FCH and mu domain containing endocytic adaptor 1
- External IDs: OMIM: 613437; MGI: 1921265; GeneCards: FCHO1

Gene location (Human)
Chr.	Chromosome 19 (human)
Band	19p13.11	Start	17,747,718 bp
Band	19p13.11	End	17,788,568 bp

Gene location (Mouse)
Chr.	Chromosome 8 (mouse)
Band	8|8 B3.3	Start	72,161,031 bp
Band	8|8 B3.3	End	72,178,360 bp
RNA expression pattern
Bgee	Human / Mouse (ortholog); Top expressed in: granulocyte; C1 segment; oocyte; right frontal lobe; blood; right hemisphere of cerebellum; lymph node; monocyte; putamen; prefrontal cortex / Top expressed in: superior frontal gyrus; primary visual cortex; thymus; perirhinal cortex; entorhinal cortex; cerebellar cortex; dentate gyrus of hippocampal formation granule cell; lumbar subsegment of spinal cord; primary motor cortex; olfactory tubercle; More reference expression data
BioGPS	n/a
Gene ontology
Molecular function	AP-2 adaptor complex binding; protein binding; phospholipid binding; microtubule binding; cytoskeletal protein binding; tubulin binding
Cellular component	plasma membrane; clathrin-coated pit; membrane; clathrin-coated vesicle; nucleoplasm; cytosol; cytoplasm; cytoskeleton; AP-2 adaptor complex
Biological process	clathrin-dependent endocytosis; endocytosis; clathrin coat assembly; membrane organization; plasma membrane tubulation
Sources:Amigo / QuickGO
Orthologs
Databases	NCBI: entry; OMA: entry
Species	Human	Mouse
Entrez	23149	74015
Ensembl	ENSG00000130475	ENSMUSG00000070000
UniProt	O14526	Q8K285
RefSeq (mRNA)	NM_001161357; NM_001161358; NM_001161359; NM_015122	NM_028715
RefSeq (protein)	NP_001154829; NP_001154830; NP_001154831; NP_055937	NP_082991
Location (UCSC)	Chr 19: 17.75 – 17.79 Mb	Chr 8: 72.16 – 72.18 Mb
PubMed search
- Wikidata
View/Edit Human	View/Edit Mouse

FCH domain only 1 is a protein that in humans is encoded by the FCHO1 gene.
