= SNAP91 =

Protein-coding gene in the species Homo sapiens

Identifiers
- Aliases: SNAP91, AP180, CALM, synaptosome associated protein 91kDa, synaptosome associated protein 91
- External IDs: OMIM: 607923; MGI: 109132; HomoloGene: 8429; GeneCards: SNAP91; OMA:SNAP91 - orthologs

Gene location (Human)
Chr.	Chromosome 6 (human)
Band	6q14.2	Start	83,552,880 bp
Band	6q14.2	End	83,709,691 bp

Gene location (Mouse)
Chr.	Chromosome 9 (mouse)
Band	9|9 E3.1	Start	86,647,976 bp
Band	9|9 E3.1	End	86,762,707 bp
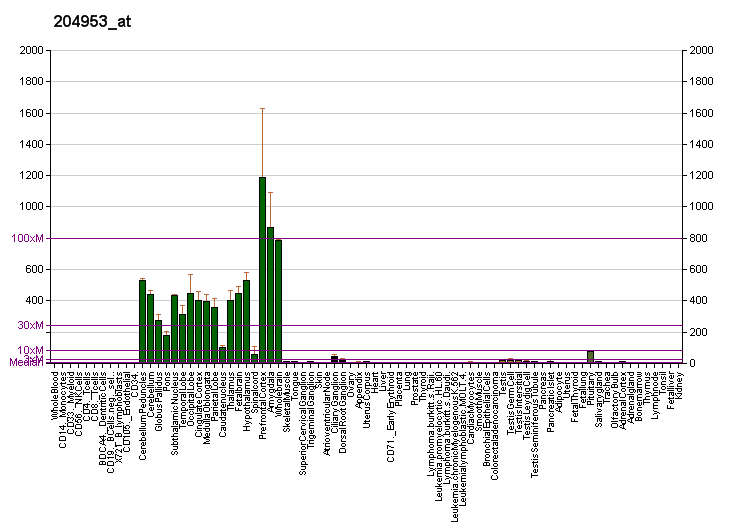
RNA expression pattern
Bgee	Human / Mouse (ortholog); Top expressed in: middle temporal gyrus; Brodmann area 23; cerebellar vermis; endothelial cell; pons; lateral nuclear group of thalamus; superior frontal gyrus; orbitofrontal cortex; frontal pole; primary visual cortex / Top expressed in: pontine nuclei; medial dorsal nucleus; ventral tegmental area; medial vestibular nucleus; dorsal tegmental nucleus; anterior amygdaloid area; cerebellar vermis; lobe of cerebellum; dorsomedial hypothalamic nucleus; medial geniculate nucleus; More reference expression data
BioGPS	More reference expression data
Gene ontology
Molecular function	clathrin binding; 1-phosphatidylinositol binding; protein binding; phospholipid binding; protein kinase binding; SNARE binding; phosphatidylinositol-4,5-bisphosphate binding; clathrin heavy chain binding
Cellular component	plasma membrane; clathrin-coated pit; membrane; clathrin-coated vesicle; synaptic vesicle; presynaptic membrane; extrinsic component of presynaptic endocytic zone membrane
Biological process	clathrin coat assembly; protein transport; regulation of clathrin-dependent endocytosis; endocytosis; vesicle budding from membrane; synaptic vesicle budding from presynaptic endocytic zone membrane; synaptic vesicle endocytosis; clathrin-dependent endocytosis; chemical synaptic transmission
Sources:Amigo / QuickGO
Orthologs
Species	Human	Mouse
Entrez	9892	20616
Ensembl	ENSG00000065609	ENSMUSG00000033419
UniProt	O60641	Q61548
RefSeq (mRNA)	NM_001242792; NM_001242793; NM_001242794; NM_001256717; NM_001256718 NM_014841; NM_001363677	NM_001277982; NM_001277983; NM_001277985; NM_001277986; NM_013669 NM_001357768; NM_001357770; NM_001357772
RefSeq (protein)	NP_001229721; NP_001229722; NP_001229723; NP_001243646; NP_001243647 NP_055656; NP_001350606; NP_001363604; NP_001363605; NP_001363606; NP_001363607; NP_001363608; NP_001363609; NP_001363610; NP_001363611; NP_001363612; NP_001363613; NP_001363614; NP_001363615; NP_001363616; NP_001363617; NP_001363618; NP_001363619; NP_001363620; NP_001363621; NP_001363622; NP_001363623; NP_001363624; NP_001363625; NP_001363626; NP_001363627; NP_001363628; NP_001363629; NP_001363630; NP_001363631; NP_001363632; NP_001363633; NP_001363634; NP_001363635; NP_001363636; NP_001363637; NP_001363638; NP_001363639; NP_001363640; NP_001363641; NP_001363642; NP_001363643; NP_001363644; NP_001363645; NP_001363646; NP_001363647; NP_001363648; NP_001363649; NP_001363650; NP_001363652; NP_001363655; NP_001363657; NP_001363660; NP_001363662; NP_001363663; NP_001363664; NP_001363665; NP_001363666; NP_001363667; NP_001363668; NP_001363669; NP_001363670; NP_001363671	NP_001264911; NP_001264912; NP_001264914; NP_001264915; NP_038697 NP_001344697; NP_001344699; NP_001344701
Location (UCSC)	Chr 6: 83.55 – 83.71 Mb	Chr 9: 86.65 – 86.76 Mb
PubMed search
- Wikidata
View/Edit Human	View/Edit Mouse

Clathrin coat assembly protein AP180 is a protein that in humans is encoded by the SNAP91 gene.
