= Ap180 =

Protein

AP180 is a protein that plays an important role in clathrin-mediated endocytosis of synaptic vesicles. It is capable of simultaneously binding both membrane lipids (via an ANTH domain) and clathrin and is therefore thought to recruit clathrin to the membrane of newly invaginating vesicles. In Drosophila melanogaster (fruit flies), deletion of the AP180 homologue, leads to enlarged but much fewer vesicles and an overall decrease in transmitter release. In D. melanogaster it was also shown that AP180 is also required for either recycling vesicle proteins and/or maintaining the distribution of both vesicle and synaptic proteins in the nerve terminal. A ubiquitous form of the protein in mammals, CALM, (Clathrin-assembly lymphoid myeloid leukaemia protein) is named after its association with myeloid and lymphoid leukemias where some translocations map to this gene. The C-terminus of AP180 is a powerful and specific inhibitor of clathrin-mediated endocytosis.

More information is found on endocytosis.org.

== See also ==
- Amphiphysin
- Epsin

== Notes ==
2. Zhang B, Koh YH, Beckstead RB, Budnik V, Ganetzky B, Bellen HJ (December 1998). "Synaptic vesicle size and number are regulated by a clathrin adaptor protein required for endocytosis". Neuron. 21 (6): 1465–75. doi:10.1016/S0896-6273(00)80664-9. PMID 9883738.

3. Nonet ML, Holgado AM, Brewer F, et al. (July 1999). "UNC-11, a Caenorhabditis elegans AP180 homologue, regulates the size and protein composition of synaptic vesicles". Mol. Biol. Cell. 10 (7): 2343–60. doi:10.1091/mbc.10.7.2343. PMC 25452. PMID 10397769.
