= Graeme Mitchison =

English polymath

Graeme Mitchison (26 August 1944 – 13 April 2018) was an English mathematician and scientist. He studied neuroscience, physics and molecular biology.

Born in 1944, Mitchison attended the Shene Grammar School as a child, then went on to study maths at New College, Oxford. In his later life, he worked as a physicist for the Centre for Quantum Computation at Cambridge. Mitchison died in 2018 from brain cancer.
