= TACC3 =

Protein-coding gene in the species Homo sapiens

Identifiers
- Aliases: TACC3, ERIC-1, ERIC1, transforming acidic coiled-coil containing protein 3, Tacc4, maskin
- External IDs: OMIM: 605303; MGI: 1341163; GeneCards: TACC3
Available structures
PDB	Ortholog search: PDBe RCSB
PDB	List of PDB id codes 4LPZ, 4PKY

Gene location (Human)
Chr.	Chromosome 4 (human)
Band	4p16.3	Start	1,712,858 bp
Band	4p16.3	End	1,745,171 bp

Gene location (Mouse)
Chr.	Chromosome 5 (mouse)
Band	5|5 B2	Start	33,658,128 bp
Band	5|5 B2	End	33,678,995 bp
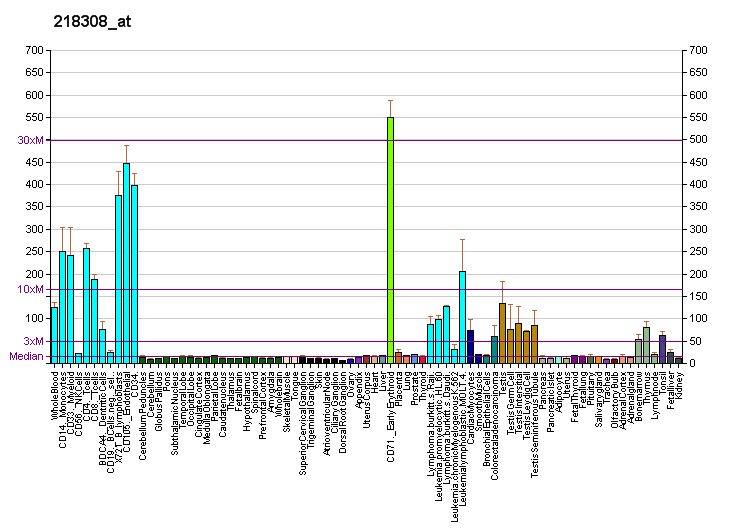
RNA expression pattern
Bgee	Human / Mouse (ortholog); Top expressed in: oocyte; ventricular zone; secondary oocyte; right testis; left testis; granulocyte; monocyte; blood; ganglionic eminence; gonad / Top expressed in: primary oocyte; ventricular zone; yolk sac; epiblast; tail of embryo; primitive streak; spermatocyte; genital tubercle; maxillary prominence; embryo; More reference expression data
BioGPS	More reference expression data
Gene ontology
Molecular function	protein binding
Cellular component	cytoplasm; microtubule cytoskeleton; spindle pole; spindle; cytoskeleton; microtubule organizing center; cytosol; mitotic spindle
Biological process	cell population proliferation; cerebral cortex development; metaphase; regulation of mitotic spindle organization; microtubule cytoskeleton organization involved in mitosis; cell cycle; cell division; microtubule cytoskeleton organization; mitotic spindle organization
Sources:Amigo / QuickGO
Orthologs
Databases	NCBI: entry; OMA: entry
Species	Human	Mouse
Entrez	10460	21335
Ensembl	ENSG00000013810	ENSMUSG00000037313
UniProt	Q9Y6A5	Q9JJ11
RefSeq (mRNA)	NM_006342	NM_001040435; NM_011524; NM_001310541
RefSeq (protein)	NP_006333	n/a
Location (UCSC)	Chr 4: 1.71 – 1.75 Mb	Chr 5: 33.66 – 33.68 Mb
PubMed search
- Wikidata
View/Edit Human	View/Edit Mouse

Transforming acidic coiled-coil-containing protein 3 is a protein that in humans is encoded by the TACC3 gene.

The function of this gene has not yet been determined; however, it is speculated that it may be involved in cell growth and differentiation. Expression of this gene is up-regulated in some cancer cell lines, and in embryonic day 15 in mice.
