= ENTH domain-containing protein 1 =

Protein-coding gene in the species Homo sapiens

ENTHD1

Identifiers
- Aliases: ENTHD1, CACNA1I, dJ370M22.3, ENTH domain containing 1
- External IDs: MGI: 2686088; HomoloGene: 45131; GeneCards: ENTHD1; OMA:ENTHD1 - orthologs

Gene location (Human)
Chr.	Chromosome 22 (human)
Band	22q13.1	Start	39,743,044 bp
Band	22q13.1	End	39,893,864 bp

Gene location (Mouse)
Chr.	Chromosome 15 (mouse)
Band	15|15 E1	Start	80,336,441 bp
Band	15|15 E1	End	80,449,357 bp
RNA expression pattern
Bgee	Human / Mouse (ortholog); Top expressed in: testicle; right testis; left testis; gonad; tibial nerve; sperm; lymph node; nucleus accumbens; appendix; monocyte / Top expressed in: spermatocyte; seminiferous tubule; spermatid; embryo; vastus lateralis muscle; central gray substance of midbrain; submandibular gland; skin of abdomen; gastrula; More reference expression data
BioGPS	n/a
Orthologs
Species	Human	Mouse
Entrez	150350	383075
Ensembl	ENSG00000176177	ENSMUSG00000050439
UniProt	Q8IYW4	E9Q1Z2
RefSeq (mRNA)	NM_152512	NM_001163189
RefSeq (protein)	NP_689725	NP_001156661
Location (UCSC)	Chr 22: 39.74 – 39.89 Mb	Chr 15: 80.34 – 80.45 Mb
PubMed search
- Wikidata
View/Edit Human	View/Edit Mouse

ENTH domain-containing protein 1, also known as Epsin-2B and ENTHD1, is a protein that in humans is encoded by the ENTHD1 gene.

== Gene ==
The ENTHD1 gene is located on human chromosome 22.

== Expression ==
ENTHD1 proteins are expressed in 26 human organs, with the highest expression in the testes.
