= SGIP1 =

Protein-coding gene in humans

Identifiers
- Aliases: SGIP1, SH3 domain GRB2 like endophilin interacting protein 1, SH3GL interacting endocytic adaptor 1
- External IDs: OMIM: 611540; MGI: 1920344; GeneCards: SGIP1
Available structures
PDB	Ortholog search: PDBe RCSB
PDB	List of PDB id codes 5AWR, 5AWT, 5AWU, 5AWS

Gene location (Human)
Chr.	Chromosome 1 (human)
Band	1p31.3	Start	66,533,267 bp
Band	1p31.3	End	66,751,139 bp

Gene location (Mouse)
Chr.	Chromosome 4 (mouse)
Band	4|4 C6	Start	102,741,297 bp
Band	4|4 C6	End	102,973,628 bp
RNA expression pattern
Bgee	Human / Mouse (ortholog); Top expressed in: stromal cell of endometrium; tibial arteries; Descending thoracic aorta; ascending aorta; prefrontal cortex; middle temporal gyrus; Brodmann area 46; Brodmann area 23; endothelial cell; C1 segment / Top expressed in: Rostral migratory stream; neural layer of retina; superior frontal gyrus; substantia nigra; dentate gyrus of hippocampal formation granule cell; piriform cortex; medial dorsal nucleus; primary visual cortex; cerebellar cortex; medial geniculate nucleus; More reference expression data
BioGPS	n/a
Gene ontology
Molecular function	microtubule binding; SH3 domain binding; tubulin binding; protein binding; phospholipid binding; cytoskeletal protein binding
Cellular component	cytoplasm; plasma membrane; clathrin-coated pit; AP-2 adaptor complex; membrane; clathrin-coated vesicle; cytosol; cytoskeleton
Biological process	positive regulation of receptor-mediated endocytosis; endocytosis; plasma membrane tubulation; membrane organization; response to dietary excess; positive regulation of feeding behavior; clathrin-dependent endocytosis; energy homeostasis; clathrin coat assembly
Sources:Amigo / QuickGO
Orthologs
Databases	NCBI: entry; OMA: entry
Species	Human	Mouse
Entrez	84251	73094
Ensembl	ENSG00000118473	ENSMUSG00000028524
UniProt	Q9BQI5	Q8VD37
RefSeq (mRNA)	NM_001308203; NM_032291; NM_001350217; NM_001350218; NM_001376534 NM_001376535; NM_001376536; NM_001376537; NM_001376538; NM_001376539; NM_001376540; NM_001376541; NM_001376542; NM_001376543; NM_001376544; NM_001376545; NM_001376546; NM_001376547; NM_001376548; NM_001376549; NM_001376550; NM_001376551; NM_001376552; NM_001376554; NM_001376555; NM_001376556; NM_001376557	NM_001285852; NM_001285859; NM_001285860; NM_001285862; NM_144906
RefSeq (protein)	NP_001295132; NP_115667; NP_001337146; NP_001337147; NP_001363463 NP_001363464; NP_001363465; NP_001363466; NP_001363467; NP_001363468; NP_001363469; NP_001363470; NP_001363471; NP_001363472; NP_001363473; NP_001363474; NP_001363475; NP_001363476; NP_001363477; NP_001363478; NP_001363479; NP_001363480; NP_001363481; NP_001363483; NP_001363484; NP_001363485; NP_001363486	NP_001272781; NP_001272788; NP_001272789; NP_001272791; NP_659155
Location (UCSC)	Chr 1: 66.53 – 66.75 Mb	Chr 4: 102.74 – 102.97 Mb
PubMed search
- Wikidata
View/Edit Human	View/Edit Mouse

SH3-containing GRB2-like protein 3-interacting protein 1 is a protein that in humans is encoded by the SGIP1 gene.
