= Cap formation =

Cellular process

When molecules on the surface of a motile eukaryotic cell are crosslinked, they are moved to one end of the cell to form a "cap". This phenomenon, the process of which is called cap formation, was discovered in 1971 on lymphocytes and is a property of amoebae and all locomotory animal cells except sperm. The crosslinking is most easily achieved using a polyvalent antibody to a surface antigen on the cell. Cap formation can be visualised by attaching a fluorophore, such as fluorescein, to the antibody.

== Steps ==
1. The antibody is bound to the cell. If the antibody is non-crosslinking (such as a Fab antibody fragment), the bound antibody is uniformly distributed. This can be done at 0 °C, room temperature, or 37 °C.
2. If the antibody is crosslinking and bound to the cells at 0 °C, the distribution of antibodies has a patchy appearance. These “patches” are two-dimensional precipitates of antigen-antibody complex and are quite analogous to the three-dimensional precipitates that form in solution.
3. If cells with patches are warmed up, the patches move to one end of the cell to form a cap. In lymphocytes, this capping process takes about 5 minutes. If carried out on cells attached to a substratum, the cap forms at the rear of the moving cell.

Capping only occurs on motile cells and is therefore believed to reflect an intrinsic property of how cells move. It is an energy dependent process and in lymphocytes is partially inhibited by cytochalasin B (which disrupts microfilaments) but unaffected by colchicine (which disrupts microtubules). However, a combination of these drugs eliminates capping. A key feature of capping is that only those molecules that are crosslinked cap: Others do not.

Cap formation is now seen as closely related to the carbon particle experiments of Abercrombie. In this case, crawling fibroblasts were held in a medium containing small (~1 micrometre in size) carbon particles. On occasion, these particles attached to the front leading edge of these cells: When they did so, the particles were observed to move rearward on the cell's dorsal surface. They did so in a roughly straight line, with the particle remaining initially stationary with respect to the substratum. The cell seemed to ooze forward under the particle. In view of what we know of capping, this phenomenon is now interpreted as follows: The particle is presumably stuck to many surface molecules, crosslinking them and forming a patch. As in capping, the particle moves toward the back of the cell.

== Proposed mechanisms ==
=== "Flow" ===
Abercrombie thought that the carbon particle is a marker on the cell surface and its behaviour reflects what the surface is doing. This led him to propose that, as a cell moves, membrane from internal stores is added at the front of the cell—enabling the cell to extend forward—and retrieved toward the rear of the cell. This process of exocytosis at the front of the cell and endocytosis elsewhere has been modified by Bretscher. He and Hopkins showed that the specific membrane endocytosed by coated pits on motile cells is returned by exocytosis to the cell surface at the leading edge. The spatial difference between the sites of exocytosis (at the front) and endocytosis (everywhere on the surface) leads to a flow of the matrix of the plasma membrane—lipids—from the front toward the rear. Large objects, such as patches, would be swept along with this flow, whereas non-crosslinked small molecules would be able to diffuse by Brownian motion against the flow and so evade being swept backward. Hence, in this theory, the need for crosslinking. Bretscher proposed that on stationary cells exocytosis is random—and therefore a major difference between motile and nonmotile cells.

=== "Cytoskeleton" ===
An alternative view is that the patches are moved to the rear of the cell by direct attachment to the actin cytoskeleton. The molecular mechanism for how this could be achieved is unclear, since, when glycolipids or GPI-bound proteins (in the outer monolayer of the cell's surface bilayer) are crosslinked, they cap, just like any surface protein. As these molecules cannot themselves interact directly with the cytoplasmic actin cytoskeleton, this scheme seems unlikely.

=== "Rake" ===
A third scheme, by de Petris, suggests that a motile cell is continuously raking its surface from front to back: Any aggregates (but not uncrosslinked molecules) caught in the teeth of the rake are moved to the back of the cell. In this scheme, the nature of the tines of the rake are not specified but could, for example, be surface integrins that often act as the feet of the cell to attach it to the substrate. The force required to rake the surface could be provided by the actin cytoskeleton.

=== "Surf" ===
A fourth scheme, by Hewitt, suggests that motile cells have rearward waves on their surfaces: patches, but not single molecules, become entrained in these waves and are thus moved to the back of the cell.
