= Anthony P. Bretscher =

British biologist

Anthony P. Bretscher (born September 8, 1950 in Harwell, Berkshire, England) is a professor of cell biology at Cornell University in the Department of Molecular Biology & Genetics in the College of Arts and Sciences.

After training as a physicist at the University of Cambridge, Dr. Bretscher earned his Ph.D. in genetics with Simon Baumberg at the University of Leeds. From there, he was a European Molecular Biology Organization (EMBO) Fellow in the Department of Biochemistry at Stanford University with Dale Kaiser. He then went as a Max Planck Society Fellow to the Department of Biochemistry in the Max Planck Institute for Biophysical Chemistry in Göttingen, Germany to work with Klaus Weber. In 1980, he was appointed to the faculty in the Cell Biology Department at the University of Texas Southwestern Medical School. He relocated to Cornell in 1981.

The Bretscher lab studies how microfilaments contribute to cell organization and cell polarity. The lab also studies how microfilaments contribute to membrane trafficking and cell signaling pathways.

He was elected to membership of the American Academy of Arts and Sciences in 2018.

He is the third son of Hanni and Egon Bretscher and brother of Mark Bretscher and Peter Bretscher.
