= Clathrin =

Protein playing a major role in the formation of coated vesicles

Clathrin heavy N-terminal propeller repeat
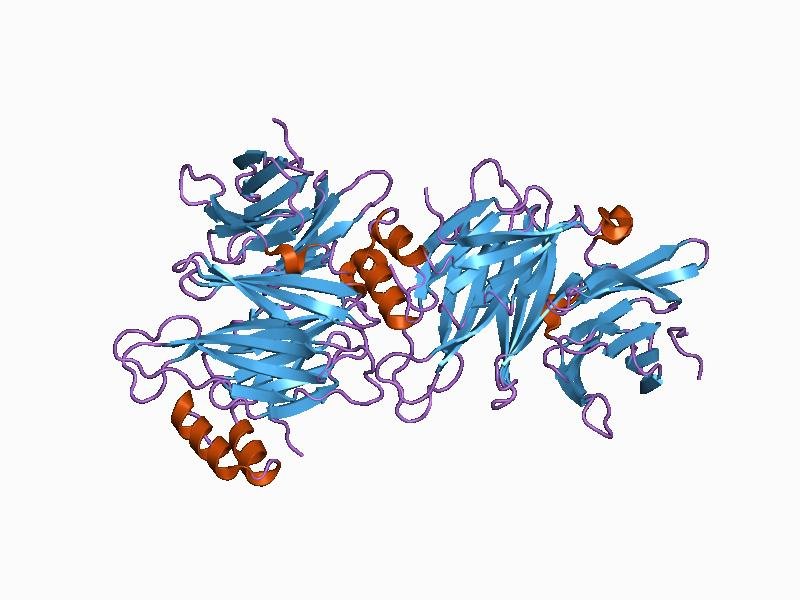
- Clathrin terminal domain

Identifiers
- Symbol: Clathrin_propel
- Pfam: PF01394
- Pfam clan: CL0020
- InterPro: IPR022365
- SCOP2: 1bpo / SCOPe / SUPFAM
Available protein structures:
- PDB: IPR022365 PF01394 (ECOD; PDBsum)
- AlphaFold: IPR022365; PF01394

Clathrin heavy-chain linker
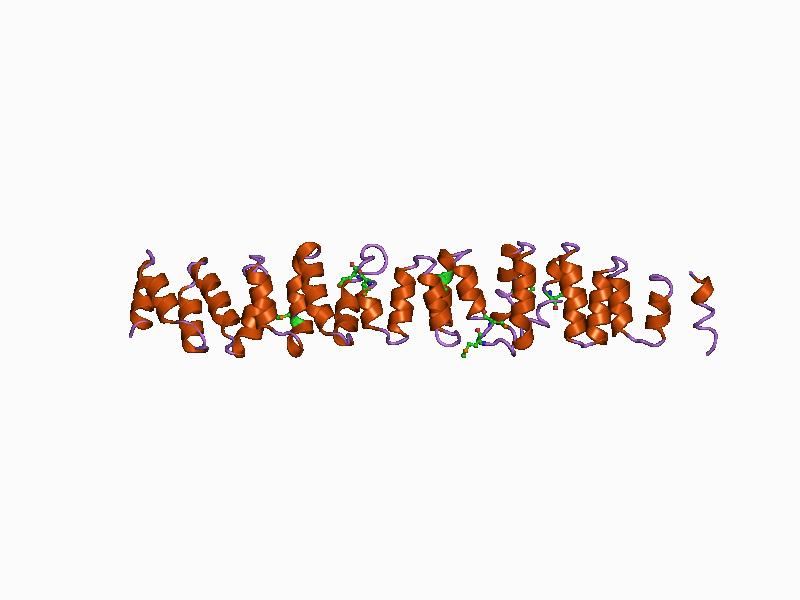
- clathrin heavy chain proximal repeat (linker)

Identifiers
- Symbol: Clathrin-link
- Pfam: PF09268
- Pfam clan: CL0020
- InterPro: IPR015348
- SCOP2: 1b89 / SCOPe / SUPFAM
Available protein structures:
- PDB: IPR015348 PF09268 (ECOD; PDBsum)
- AlphaFold: IPR015348; PF09268

CHCR/VPS 7-fold repeat

Identifiers
- Symbol: Clathrin_propel
- Pfam: PF00637
- Pfam clan: CL0020
- InterPro: IPR000547
- SMART: SM00299
- PROSITE: PS50236
- CATH: 1b89
- SCOP2: 1b89 / SCOPe / SUPFAM
Available protein structures:
- PDB: IPR000547 PF00637 (ECOD; PDBsum)
- AlphaFold: IPR000547; PF00637

Clathrin light chain

Identifiers
- Symbol: Clathrin_lg_ch
- Pfam: PF01086
- InterPro: IPR000996
- PROSITE: PDOC00196
- SCOP2: 3iyv / SCOPe / SUPFAM
Available protein structures:
- PDB: IPR000996 PF01086 (ECOD; PDBsum)
- AlphaFold: IPR000996; PF01086

Clathrin is a protein that plays a role in the formation of coated vesicles. Clathrin was first isolated by Barbara Pearse in 1976. It forms a triskelion shape composed of three clathrin heavy chains and three light chains. When the triskelia interact they form a polyhedral lattice that surrounds the vesicle. The protein's name refers to this lattice structure, deriving from Latin clathri, meaning lattice. Barbara Pearse named the protein clathrin at the suggestion of Graeme Mitchison, selecting it from three possible options. Coat-proteins, like clathrin, are used to build small vesicles in order to transport molecules within cells. The endocytosis and exocytosis of vesicles allows cells to communicate, to transfer nutrients, to import signaling receptors, to mediate an immune response after sampling the extracellular world, and to clean up the cell debris left by tissue inflammation. The endocytic pathway can be hijacked by viruses and other pathogens in order to gain entry to the cell during infection.

== Structure ==
Clathrin light chain a

Identifiers
- Symbol: CLTA
- NCBI gene: 1211
- HGNC: CLTA. HGNC:2090. CLTA.
- UniProt: P09496

Other data
- Locus: Chr. 9 q13
Search for
- Structures: Swiss-model
- Domains: InterPro

Clathrin light chain b

Identifiers
- Symbol: CLTB
- NCBI gene: 1212
- HGNC: 2091
- OMIM: 118970
- RefSeq: NM_001834
- UniProt: P09497

Other data
- Locus: Chr. 5 q35
Search for
- Structures: Swiss-model
- Domains: InterPro

Clathrin heavy chain 1

Identifiers
- Symbol: CLTC
- Alt. symbols: CHC, CHC17, CLTCL2
- NCBI gene: 1213
- HGNC: 2092
- OMIM: 118955
- RefSeq: NM_004859
- UniProt: Q00610

Other data
- Locus: Chr. 17 q23.1-qter
Search for
- Structures: Swiss-model
- Domains: InterPro

Clathrin heavy chain 2

Identifiers
- Symbol: CLTCL1
- Alt. symbols: CLTCL
- NCBI gene: 8218
- HGNC: 2093
- OMIM: 601273
- RefSeq: NM_001835
- UniProt: P53675

Other data
- Locus: Chr. 22 q11.21
Search for
- Structures: Swiss-model
- Domains: InterPro

The clathrin triskelion is composed of three clathrin heavy chains interacting at their C-termini; each ~190 kDa heavy chain has a ~25 kDa light chain tightly bound to it. The three heavy chains provide the structural backbone of the clathrin lattice, and the three light chains are thought to regulate the formation and disassembly of a clathrin lattice. There are two forms of clathrin light chains, designated a and b. The main clathrin heavy chain, located on chromosome 17 in humans, is found in all cells. A second clathrin heavy chain gene, on chromosome 22, is expressed in muscle.

Clathrin heavy chain is often described as a leg, with subdomains, representing the foot (the N-terminal domain), followed by the ankle, distal leg, knee, proximal leg, and trimerization domains. The N-terminal domain consists of a seven-bladed β-propeller structure. The other domains form a super-helix of short alpha helices. This was originally determined from the structure of the proximal leg domain that identified and is composed of a smaller structural module referred to as clathrin heavy chain repeat motifs. The light chains bind primarily to the proximal leg portion of the heavy chain with some interaction near the trimerization domain. The β-propeller at the 'foot' of clathrin contains multiple binding sites for interaction with other proteins.

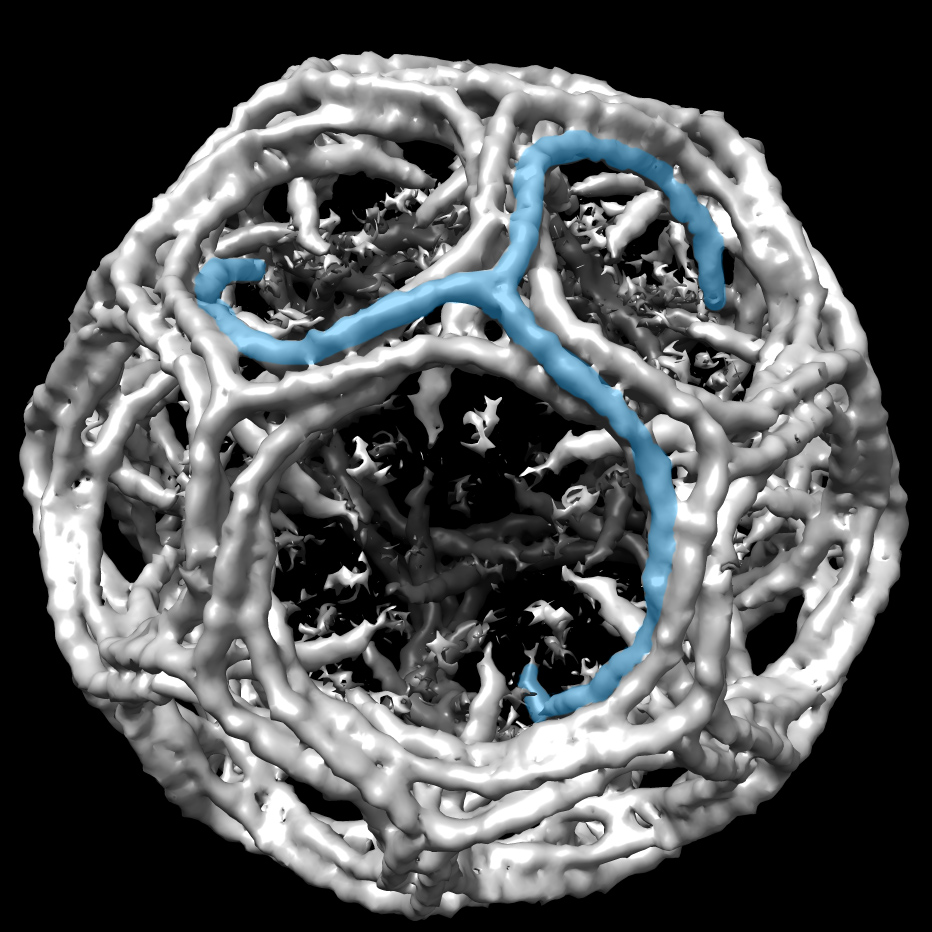
A clathrin cage with a single triskelion highlighted in blue. CryoEM map EMD_5119 was rendered in UCSF Chimera and one clathrin triskelion was highlighted.

Each cage has 12 pentagons. Mini-coat (left) has 4 hexagons and tetrahedral symmetry as in a truncated triakis tetrahedron. Hexagonal barrel (middle) has 8 hexagons and D6 symmetry. Soccer ball (right) has 20 hexagons and icosahedral symmetry as in a truncated icosahedron.

When triskelia assemble together in solution, they can interact with enough flexibility to form 6-sided rings (hexagons) that yield a flat lattice, or 5-sided rings (pentagons) that are necessary for curved lattice formation. When many triskelions connect, they can form a basket-like structure. The structure shown, is built of 36 triskelia, one of which is shown in blue. Another common assembly is a truncated icosahedron. To enclose a vesicle, exactly 12 pentagons must be present in the lattice.

In a cell, clathrin triskelion in the cytoplasm binds to an adaptor protein that has bound membrane, linking one of its three feet to the membrane at a time. Clathrin cannot bind to membrane or cargo directly and instead uses adaptor proteins to do this. This triskelion will bind to other membrane-attached triskelia to form a rounded lattice of hexagons and pentagons, reminiscent of the panels on a soccer ball, that pulls the membrane into a bud. By constructing different combinations of 5-sided and 6-sided rings, vesicles of different sizes may assemble. The smallest clathrin cage commonly imaged, called a mini-coat, has 12 pentagons and only two hexagons. Even smaller cages with zero hexagons probably do not form from the native protein, because the feet of the triskelia are too bulky.

== Function ==
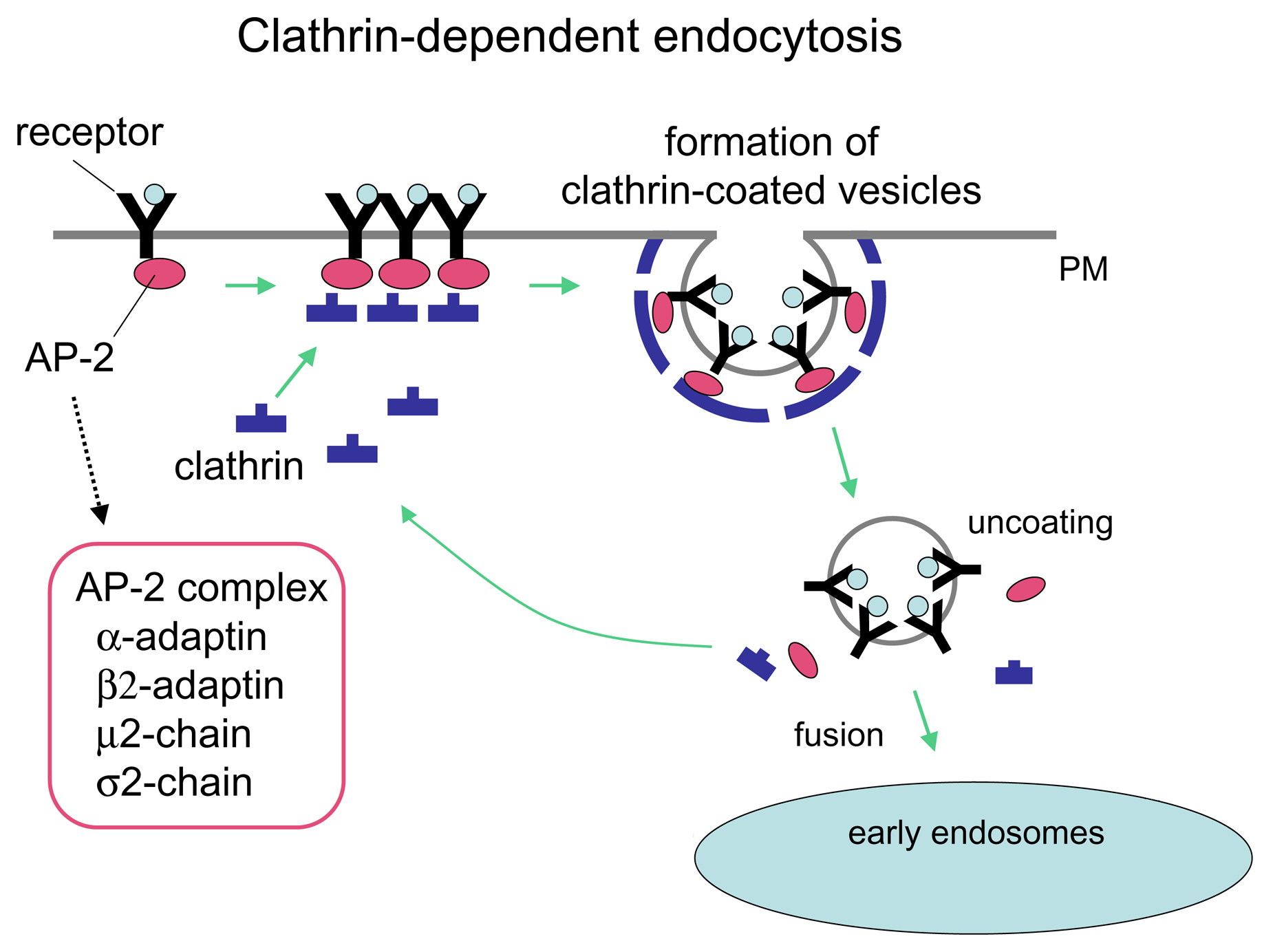
Mechanism of clathrin-mediated endocytosis.

Clathrin performs roles in shaping rounded vesicles in the cytoplasm for intracellular trafficking. Clathrin-coated vesicles (CCVs) selectively sort cargo at the cell membrane, trans-Golgi network, and endosomal compartments for multiple membrane traffic pathways. After a vesicle buds into the cytoplasm, the coat rapidly disassembles, allowing the clathrin to recycle while the vesicle gets transported to a variety of locations.

Adaptor molecules are responsible for self-assembly and recruitment. Two examples of adaptor proteins are AP180 and epsin. AP180 is used in synaptic vesicle formation. It recruits clathrin to membranes and also promotes its polymerization. Epsin also recruits clathrin to membranes and promotes its polymerization, and can help deform the membrane, and thus clathrin-coated vesicles can bud. In a cell, a triskelion floating in the cytoplasm binds to an adaptor protein, linking one of its feet to the membrane at a time. The triskelion foot will bind to other ones attached to the membrane to form a polyhedral lattice, triskelion foot, which pulls the membrane into a bud. The foot does not bind directly to the membrane, but binds to the adaptor proteins that recognize the molecules on the membrane surface.

Clathrin has another function aside from the coating of organelles. In non-dividing cells, the formation of clathrin-coated vesicles occurs continuously. Formation of clathrin-coated vesicles is shut down in cells undergoing mitosis. During mitosis, clathrin binds to the spindle apparatus, in complex with two other proteins: TACC3 and ch-TOG/CKAP5. Clathrin aids in the congression of chromosomes by stabilizing kinetochore fibers of the mitotic spindle. The amino-terminal domain of the clathrin heavy chain and the TACC domain of TACC3 make the microtubule binding surface for TACC3/ch-TOG/clathrin to bind to the mitotic spindle. The stabilization of kinetochore fibers requires the trimeric structure of clathrin in order to crosslink microtubules.

Clathrin-mediated endocytosis (CME) regulates many cellular physiological processes such as the internalization of growth factors and receptors, entry of pathogens, and synaptic transmission. It is believed that cellular invaders use the nutrient pathway to gain access to a cell's replicating mechanisms. Certain signalling molecules open the nutrients pathway. Two chemical compounds called Pitstop 1 and Pitstop 2, selective clathrin inhibitors, can interfere with the pathogenic activity, and thus protect the cells against invasion. These two compounds selectively block the endocytic ligand association with the clathrin terminal domain in vitro. However, the specificity of these compounds to block clathrin-mediated endocytosis has been questioned. In later studies, however, the specificity of Pitstop 2 was validated as being clathrin dependent.

== See also ==
- Adaptin
- Cap formation
- Cell migration
- Dynamin
