= Tetratricopeptide repeat 39A =

Protein found in humans

TTC39A

Identifiers
- Aliases: TTC39A, C1orf34, DEME-6, Tetratricopeptide Repeat 39A, tetratricopeptide repeat domain 39A
- External IDs: MGI: 2444350; GeneCards: TTC39A

Gene location (Human)
Chr.	Chromosome 1 (human)
Band	1p32.3	Start	51,287,258 bp
Band	1p32.3	End	51,345,116 bp

Gene location (Mouse)
Chr.	Chromosome 4 (mouse)
Band	4|4 C7	Start	109,263,820 bp
Band	4|4 C7	End	109,301,942 bp
RNA expression pattern
Bgee	Human / Mouse (ortholog); Top expressed in: islet of Langerhans; right testis; sperm; left testis; rectum; mucosa of sigmoid colon; mucosa of transverse colon; bronchial epithelial cell; olfactory zone of nasal mucosa; gallbladder / Top expressed in: spermatid; epithelium of stomach; seminiferous tubule; lacrimal gland; left colon; parotid gland; islet of Langerhans; seminal vesicula; Paneth cell; prostate; More reference expression data
BioGPS	n/a
Gene ontology
Molecular function	molecular function
Cellular component	cellular component
Biological process	biological process
Sources:Amigo / QuickGO
Orthologs
Databases	NCBI: entry; OMA: entry
Species	Human	Mouse
Entrez	22996	230603
Ensembl	ENSG00000085831	ENSMUSG00000028555
UniProt	Q5SRH9	A2ACP1
RefSeq (mRNA)	NM_001080494; NM_001144832; NM_001297662; NM_001297663; NM_001297664 NM_001297665; NM_001297666; NM_001297667	NM_001145948; NM_153392
RefSeq (protein)	NP_001073963; NP_001138304; NP_001284591; NP_001284592; NP_001284593 NP_001284594; NP_001284595; NP_001284596	NP_001139420; NP_700441
Location (UCSC)	Chr 1: 51.29 – 51.35 Mb	Chr 4: 109.26 – 109.3 Mb
PubMed search
- Wikidata
View/Edit Human	View/Edit Mouse

Tetratricopeptide repeat 39A is a human protein encoded by the TTC39A gene. TTC39A is also known as DEME-6 (differentially expressed in MCF7 with estradiol protein 6), KIAA0452, and c1orf34. The function of TTC39A is currently not well understood. The main feature within tetratricopeptide repeat 39A is the domain of unknown function 3808 (DUF3808), spanning almost the entire protein. KIAA0452 can also be seen as an isoform of TTC39A because of differences in genome sequence, but overlap in DUF domain.

== Gene ==
The location of TTC39A at 1p.32.3

The gene for TTC39A is located on the first chromosome at 1p32.3. The genomic DNA is 57,859 bases long, consists of 19 exons and is located on the minus strand. The mRNA has a length of 2759 bases. TTC39A is surrounded by genes for RNF11 and EPS15. Neither of these genes have a known interaction or similar function as TTC39A. There are not any known medical disorders resulting from the deletion of TTC39A.

The gene for KIAA0452 is also located on the first chromosome at 1p32.3. The genomic DNA is 34,096 bases long, consists of 11 exons and is located on the minus strand. The mRNA has a length of 6256 bases.

=== Homology ===
TTC39A has several orthologs that have been found in eukaryotes, archea, and bacteria. Two paralogs, TTC39B and TTC39C, have also been identified. The functions of TTC39B and TTC39C are not known.

Species	Common name	Accession number	Length	Protein identity	Protein similarity
Homo sapiens	Human	NP_001073963.1	613aa	100%	100%
Mus musculus	Mouse	NP_001139420.1	578aa	87.9%	91.0%
Macaca mulatta	Rhesus monkey	XP_002801613.1	550aa	92.0%	93.0%
Gallus gallus	Chicken	XP_422466.3	575aa	71.3%	81.0%
Taeniopygia guttata	Zebra finch	XP_002193183	575aa	73.0%	82.0%
Anolis carolinensis	Green anole	XP_003216860.1	570aa	58.8%	74.0%
Danio rerio	Zebra fish	XP_002663143.1	598aa	60.8%	76.0%
Branchiostoma floridae	Lancelet	XP_002591442.1	544aa	41.1%	61.0%
Physcomitrella patens	Moss	XP_001766901.1	601aa	24.2%	41.0%
Leishmania braziliensis	Euglenozoa	XP_001566995.1	584aa	21.8%	40.0%
Aster yellows	Phytoplasma	AAO61940.1	299aa	15.1%	42.0%

KIAA0452 has several similar orthologs as TTC39A from eukaryotes, achea and bacteria but different protein identities and similarities.

Species	Common name	Accession number	Length	Protein identity	Protein similarity
Homo sapiens	Human	AB007921	453aa	100%	100%
Homo sapiens	Human	BC028374.2	629aa	99%	99%
Mus musculus	Mouse	AK172951.1	574aa	85%	87%
Macaca mulatta	Rhesus monkey	XP_002801613	550aa	88%	88%
Taeniopygia gutlata	Zebra finch	XP_002193183.2	549aa	72%	79%
Anolis carolinensis	Green anole	XP_003216860.1	570aa	56%	69%
Danio rerio	Zebra fish	XP_002663143	598aa	60%	71%
Branchiostoma floridae	Lancelet	XP_002591442.1	544aa	42%	62%
Physcomitrella patens	Moss	XP_001766901.1	601aa	25%	41%
Leishmania braziliensis	Euglenoza	XP_001566995.1	584aa	28%	48%
Aster yellows	Phytoplasma	AAO61940.1	299aa	24%	42%

== mRNA features ==
=== Promoter ===
The predicted promoter for the TTC39A gene spans 713 bp from 51,796,048 to 51,796,760.

A predicted promoter for KIAA0452 gene spans 600 bp from 51,796,517 to 51,797,117.

=== Transcription factors ===
Below are some of transcription factors that exist for the predicted the promoter sequence.

Detailed family information	Start	End	Strand
Myeloid zinc finger protein MZF1	286	296	+
Fork head domain factors FOXK2	54	70	-
X-linked zinc finger protein ZFX and ZFY	118	128	-
E2F transcription factor 4, p107/p130-binding protein	475	491	-
SPI-1 proto-oncogene; hematopoietic transcription factor PU.1	205	225	+
Hematopoietically expressed homeobox, proline-rich homeodomain protein	108	126	+

Below are some of transcription factors, with similarity of 1, that exist for the predicted promoter sequence.

Detailed family information	Start	End	Strand
AP1 activating protein 1	22	34	+
Myeloid Zinc finger protein MZF1	577	587	+
Myeloid transforming protein EVI1 (Ectotropic viral integration site 1 encoded factor, amino-terminal zinc finger domain)	16	32	+
C2H2 zinc finger transcription factor 2	539	561	-
Fork Head domain factor alternative splice variant of FOXP1 (activated in ESCs)	410	426	-
Pleomorphic adenoma gene 1	209	231	+

== Protein ==
Protein features including the location of DUF3808, TPR_16, and the circled predicted transmembrane domain

The longest protein sequence consists of 613 amino acids. Within TTC39A, there is a domain of unknown function, DUF 3808. DUF 3808 is generally considered to be an outer mitochondrial membrane protein and has been conserved from fungi to humans. DUF 3808 also contains a tetratricopeptide, TPR_16 and a predicted transmembrane domain. The structure of TTC39A is predicted to have 12 alpha helices and a single beta sheet.

KIAA0452 has a protein sequence with 453 amino acids. The structure of KIAA0452 is predicted to have 11 alpha helices and 9 beta sheets. KIAA0452 overlaps TTC39A via a domain of unknown function, DUF 3808. KIAA0452 has a predicted molecular weight of 49.4 kdal and an isoelectric point of 6.766000.

=== Expression ===
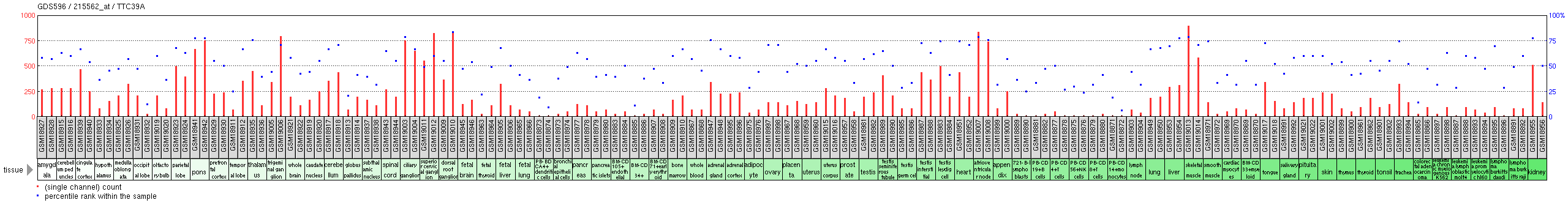
The expression levels of TTC39A found throughout the human body

There are 17 splice variants for TTC39A. TTC39A is a highly expressed protein in the human body. The highest levels of expression are located in mammary glands and testis. The lowest levels of expression are found in the immune system.

KIAA0452 expression is most prevalent in the brain, with the highest levels in the trigeminal ganglion and occipital lobe

TTC39A is induced by TFAP2C in hormone responsive breast carcinoma cells and TTC39A is expressed in estrogen receptor positive carcinoma cell lines.

=== Post translational modifications ===
There are several predicted phosphorylation sites but none have been experimentally confirmed. A single sulfination site is predicted at position 175.

KIAA0452 has a single N-acetalation site at position 274.

== Interactions ==
TTC39A has been found to interact with BTNL2 and MAPK3.
