= MiR-296 =

miR-296
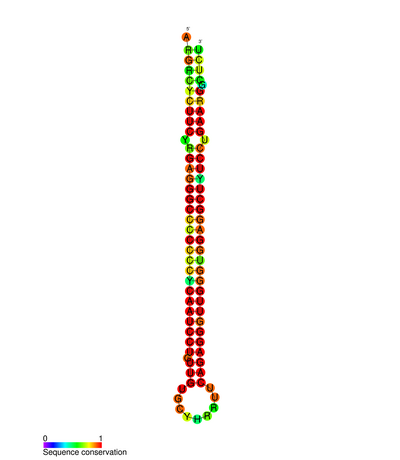
- Conserved secondary structure of miR-296 microRNA precursor

Identifiers
- Symbol: miR-296
- Alt. Symbols: MIR296
- Rfam: RF00733
- miRBase: MI0000747
- miRBase family: MIPF0000159
- NCBI Gene: 407022
- HGNC: 31617
- OMIM: 610945
- RefSeq: NR_029844

Other data
- RNA type: miRNA
- Domain(s): Mammalia
- GO: 0035195
- SO: 0001244
- Locus: Chr. 20 q13.32
- PDB structures: PDBe

miR-296 is a family of microRNA precursors found in mammals, including humans. The ~22 nucleotide mature miRNA sequence is excised from the precursor hairpin by the enzyme Dicer. This sequence then associates with RISC which effects RNA interference.

miR-296 has been named an "angiomiR" due to being characterised as a microRNA which regulates angiogenesis, the process of growth and creation of new blood vessels. miR-296 is thought to have a specific role in cancer in promoting tumour angiogenesis. It achieves this by targeting HGS mRNA, reducing its expression in endothelial cells which then results in greater number of VEGF receptors.

miR-296 has predicted target sites in the transcription factor NANOG and may also contribute to carcinogenesis by dysregulating p53.
