= STAM2 =

Protein-coding gene in the species Homo sapiens

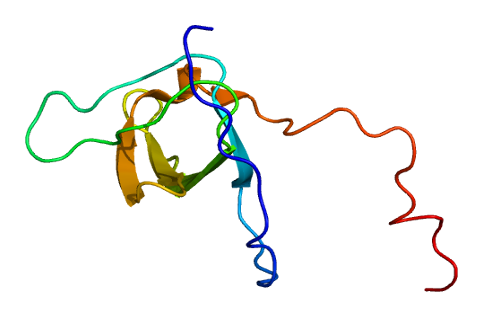

Identifiers
- Aliases: STAM2, Hbp, STAM2A, STAM2B, signal transducing adaptor molecule 2
- External IDs: OMIM: 606244; MGI: 1929100; GeneCards: STAM2
Available structures
PDB	Ortholog search: PDBe RCSB
PDB	List of PDB id codes 1X2Q, 1X5B, 2L0T, 5CRV

Gene location (Human)
Chr.	Chromosome 2 (human)
Band	2q23.3	Start	152,116,801 bp
Band	2q23.3	End	152,175,763 bp

Gene location (Mouse)
Chr.	Chromosome 2 (mouse)
Band	2|2 C1.1	Start	52,581,676 bp
Band	2|2 C1.1	End	52,632,293 bp
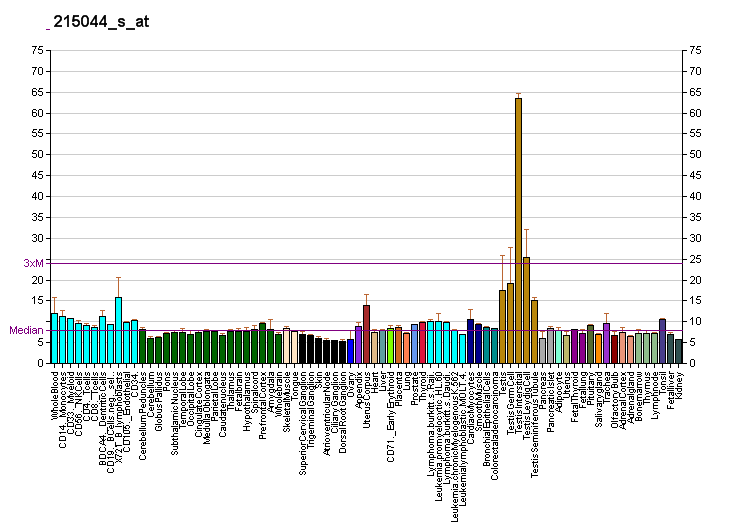

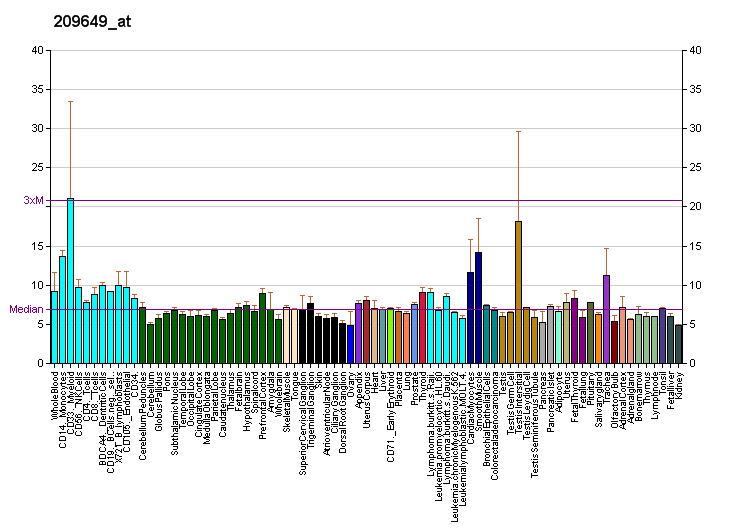

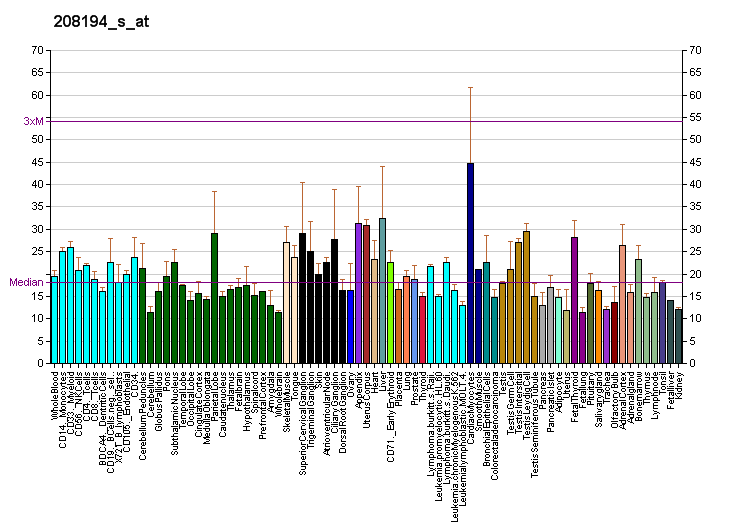
RNA expression pattern
Bgee	Human / Mouse (ortholog); Top expressed in: tendon of biceps brachii; Achilles tendon; mucosa of paranasal sinus; bronchial epithelial cell; epithelium of nasopharynx; internal globus pallidus; oocyte; buccal mucosa cell; superficial temporal artery; secondary oocyte / Top expressed in: spermatid; spermatocyte; morula; morula; pineal gland; median eminence; epithelium of stomach; habenula; neural layer of retina; seminiferous tubule; More reference expression data
BioGPS	More reference expression data
Gene ontology
Molecular function	protein binding
Cellular component	cytoplasm; ESCRT-0 complex; endosome; early endosome membrane; intracellular membrane-bounded organelle; membrane; nucleoplasm; cytosol
Biological process	protein transport; endosomal transport; multivesicular body assembly; intracellular protein transport; negative regulation of epidermal growth factor receptor signaling pathway; macroautophagy; membrane organization; protein deubiquitination
Sources:Amigo / QuickGO
Orthologs
Databases	NCBI: entry; OMA: entry
Species	Human	Mouse
Entrez	10254	56324
Ensembl	ENSG00000115145	ENSMUSG00000055371
UniProt	O75886	O88811
RefSeq (mRNA)	NM_005843	NM_019667
RefSeq (protein)	NP_005834	NP_062641
Location (UCSC)	Chr 2: 152.12 – 152.18 Mb	Chr 2: 52.58 – 52.63 Mb
PubMed search
- Wikidata
View/Edit Human	View/Edit Mouse

Signal transducing adapter molecule 2 is a protein that in humans is encoded by the STAM2 gene.

== Function ==
The protein encoded by this gene is closely related to STAM, an adaptor protein involved in the downstream signaling of cytokine receptors, both of which contain a SH3 domain and the immunoreceptor tyrosine-based activation motif (ITAM). Similar to STAM, this protein acts downstream of JAK kinases, and is phosphorylated in response to cytokine stimulation. This protein and STAM thus are thought to exhibit compensatory effects on the signaling pathway downstream of JAK kinases upon cytokine stimulation.

== Interactions ==
STAM2 has been shown to interact with HGS, Janus kinase 1 and USP8.
