= CIMAP1C =

Human gene

Identifiers
- Aliases: CIMAP1C, outer dense fiber of sperm tails 3 like 1, ODF3L1, Ciliary microtubule associated protein 1C
- External IDs: MGI: 2681875; GeneCards: CIMAP1C

Gene location (Human)
Chr.	Chromosome 15 (human)
Band	15q24.2	Start	75,724,041 bp
Band	15q24.2	End	75,727,688 bp

Gene location (Mouse)
Chr.	Chromosome 9 (mouse)
Band	9|9 B	Start	56,755,943 bp
Band	9|9 B	End	56,771,963 bp
RNA expression pattern
Bgee	Human / Mouse (ortholog); Top expressed in: left testis; right testis; gastric mucosa; gallbladder; smooth muscle tissue; cartilage tissue; skin of abdomen; mucosa of transverse colon; stromal cell of endometrium; right auricle of heart / Top expressed in: testicle; spermatid; white adipose tissue; esophagus; spermatocyte; skeletal muscle tissue; zone of skin; jejunum; duodenum; ileum; More reference expression data
BioGPS	n/a
Orthologs
Databases	NCBI: entry; OMA: entry
Species	Human	Mouse
Entrez	161753	382075
Ensembl	ENSG00000182950	ENSMUSG00000045620
UniProt	Q8IXM7	Q810P2
RefSeq (mRNA)	NM_175881	NM_198673; NM_001374681
RefSeq (protein)	NP_787077	NP_941075; NP_001361610
Location (UCSC)	Chr 15: 75.72 – 75.73 Mb	Chr 9: 56.76 – 56.77 Mb
PubMed search
- Wikidata
View/Edit Human	View/Edit Mouse

CIMAP1C (ciliary microtubule associated protein 1C) is a gene in humans that encodes the CIMAP1C protein. It is also often referred to as ODF3L1 (outer dense fiber protein 3-like protein 1). CIMAP1C is expressed in low levels throughout the body with high expression levels in the testes. It is highly conserved in mammals and reptiles but not present in birds or amphibians, indicating it arose around 300 million years ago.

== Gene ==
The CIMAP1C gene is found on Chromosome 15 at position 15q24.2, spanning 3.72 kb. It contains 4 exons and 1,132 nucleotides.

=== Aliases ===
CIMAP1C is also known as ODF3L1 (outer dense fiber protein 3 like protein 1).

== Protein ==
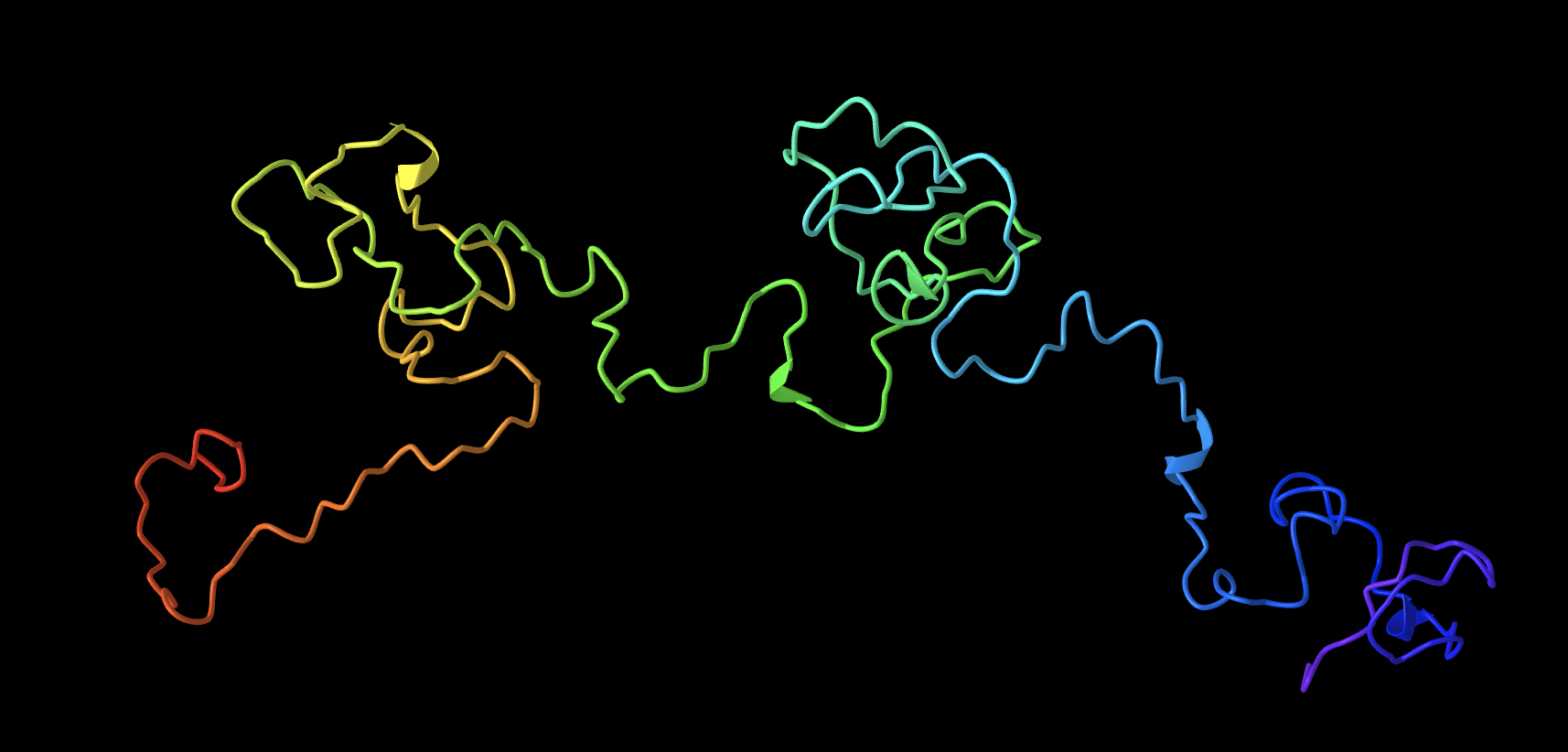
CIMAP1C tertiary structure created by I-Tasser. Coloring is rainbow from left to right, where red represents the N-terminus and purple the C-terminus.

The CIMAP1C protein is 274 amino acids long and its molecular weight is ~31 kDa. Its isoelectric point is 9.6. There are no known isoforms. CIMAP1C is very basic, proline rich, and highly tyrosine rich. There are two structurally significant regions known as sperm tail proline-glycine rich repeat regions. These regions are highly conserved and contain glycosylation and phosphorylation sites.

== Gene level regulation ==
CIMAP1C is expressed at low levels in most tissues in the body (15.7%), with high expression in the testis. Slightly high levels of expression are seen in the mammary glands.

== Protein level regulation ==
CIMAP1C is imported into the nucleus via two nuclear localization signals, and can otherwise be found in the cytoskeleton. CIMAP1C contains a variety of phosphorylation sites, specifically protein kinase C and Casein kinase II phosphorylation.

== Evolution ==
=== Paralogs ===
There are no paralogs of the CIMAP1C gene.

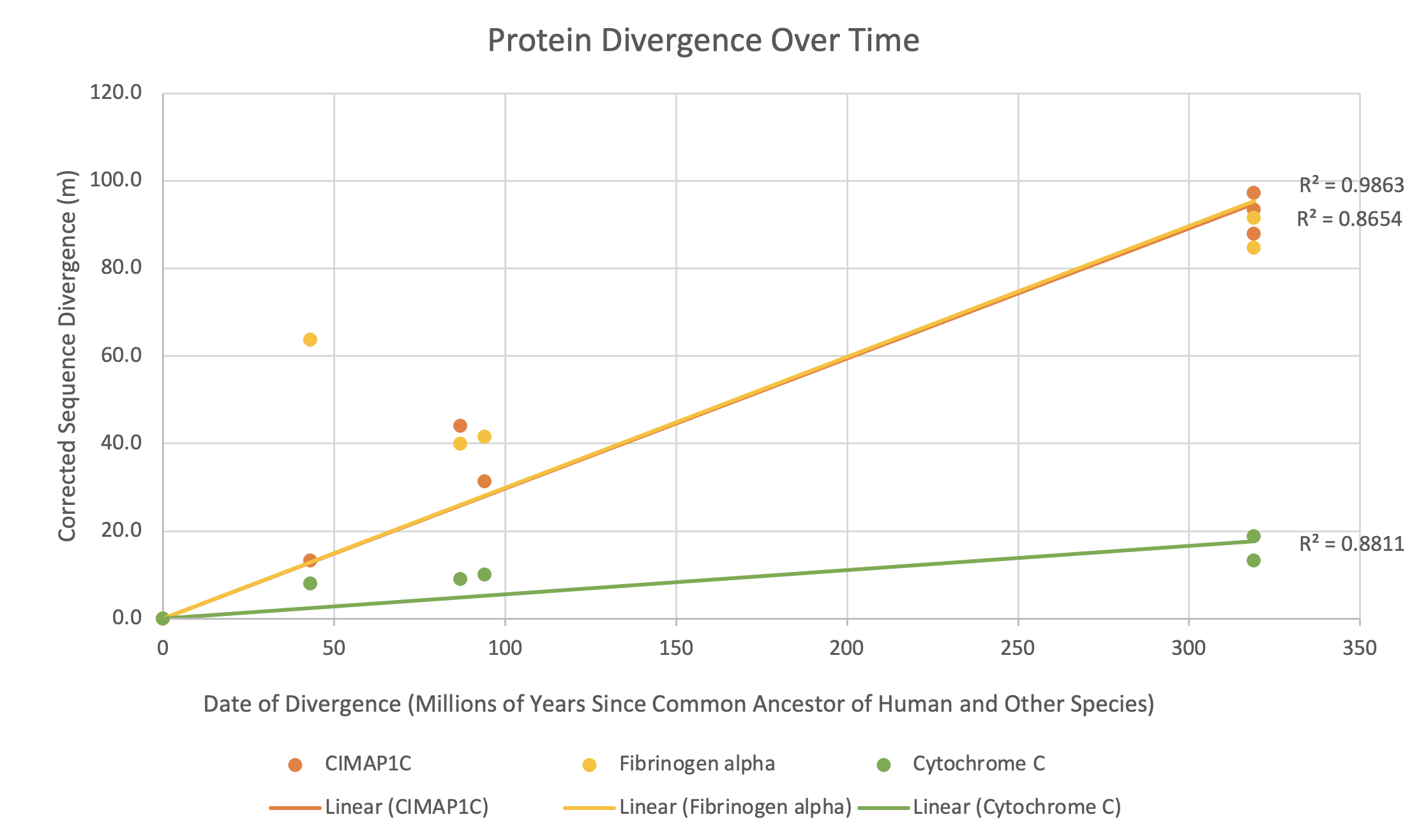
Corrected sequence divergence of the CIMAP1C, Cytochrome C and Fibrinogen alpha divergence dates. The CIMAP1C and Fibrinogen alpha dates are in orange and yellow respectively and are on top of one another.

=== Orthologs ===
CIMAP1C is highly conserved, and can be found in mammals and reptiles. CIMAP1C is not found in amphibians or birds, therefore it arose 300 million years ago. Based on the calculated protein divergence figure, CIMAP1C evolves rapidly and similarly to Fibrinogen Alpha. The table below lists orthologs and their information.

CIMAP1C Orthologs
Genus and species	Common name	Taxonomic group	Mediat Date of Divergence (MYA)	Accession number	Sequence length (aa)	Sequence Identity to human protein (%)	Sequence Similarity to human Protein (%)
Homo sapiens	Human	Primates	0.0	NP_787077.1	274	100.0	100.0
Saimiri boliviensis	Squirrel Monkey	Primates	43	XP_010329148.1	274	87.6	92.7
Canis lupus familiaris	Dog	Carnivora	94	XP_038297715.1	275	78.2	88.4
Mus musculus	House Mouse	Rodentia	87	NP_001361610.1	306	64.4	75.5
Myotis brandtii	Brandt's Bat	Chiroptera	94	XP_005884580.1	275	74.5	85.8
Gracilinanus agilis	Mouse Opossum	Didelphimorphia	160	XP_044518760.1	278	58.8	73.8
Bubalus bubalis	Water buffalo	Artiodactyla	94	XP_006080752.3	274	73.1	84.4
Pogona vitticeps	Central Bearded Dragon	Squamata	319	XP_020640486.1	285	40.2	54.3
Notechis scutatus	Tiger snake	Squamata	319	XP_026540911.1	195	28.4	41.4
Dermochelys coriacea	Leatherback Sea Turtle	Testudines	319	XP_038274105.1	274	37.8	54.7
Alligator mississippiensis	American Alligator	Crocodylia	319	XP_019333216.1	249	37.8	52.8
Phascolarctos cinereus	Koala	Diprotodontia	160	XP_020850090.1	278	59	73.4
Phocoena sinus	Vaquita	Artiodactyla	94	XP_032479987.1	275	77.5	87.3
Eublepharis macularius	Leopard gecko	Squamata	319	XP_054858185.1	276	38.5	50.7
Ornithorhynchus anatinus	Platypus	Monotremata	180	XP_001509549.1	269	45.8	58.8

== Interacting proteins ==
It has been experimentally determined that CIMAP1C interacts with STAMBP (STAM binding protein) through affinity chromatography. STAMBP regulates cell surface receptor-mediated endocytosis and ubiquitin-dependent receptor sorting to lysosomes.

== Clinical significance ==
Expression levels of CIMAP1C are positive markers of disease prognosis for those with papillary thyroid carcinoma (PTC) and non-metastatic breast cancer (NMBC). High levels of CIMAP1C in tumor tissues accurately predicted a better prognosis for individuals with PTC. CIMAP1C is also noted as a positive indicator for the effectiveness of NMBC radiotherapy.
