= Seres SF5 =

Electric compact crossover SUV

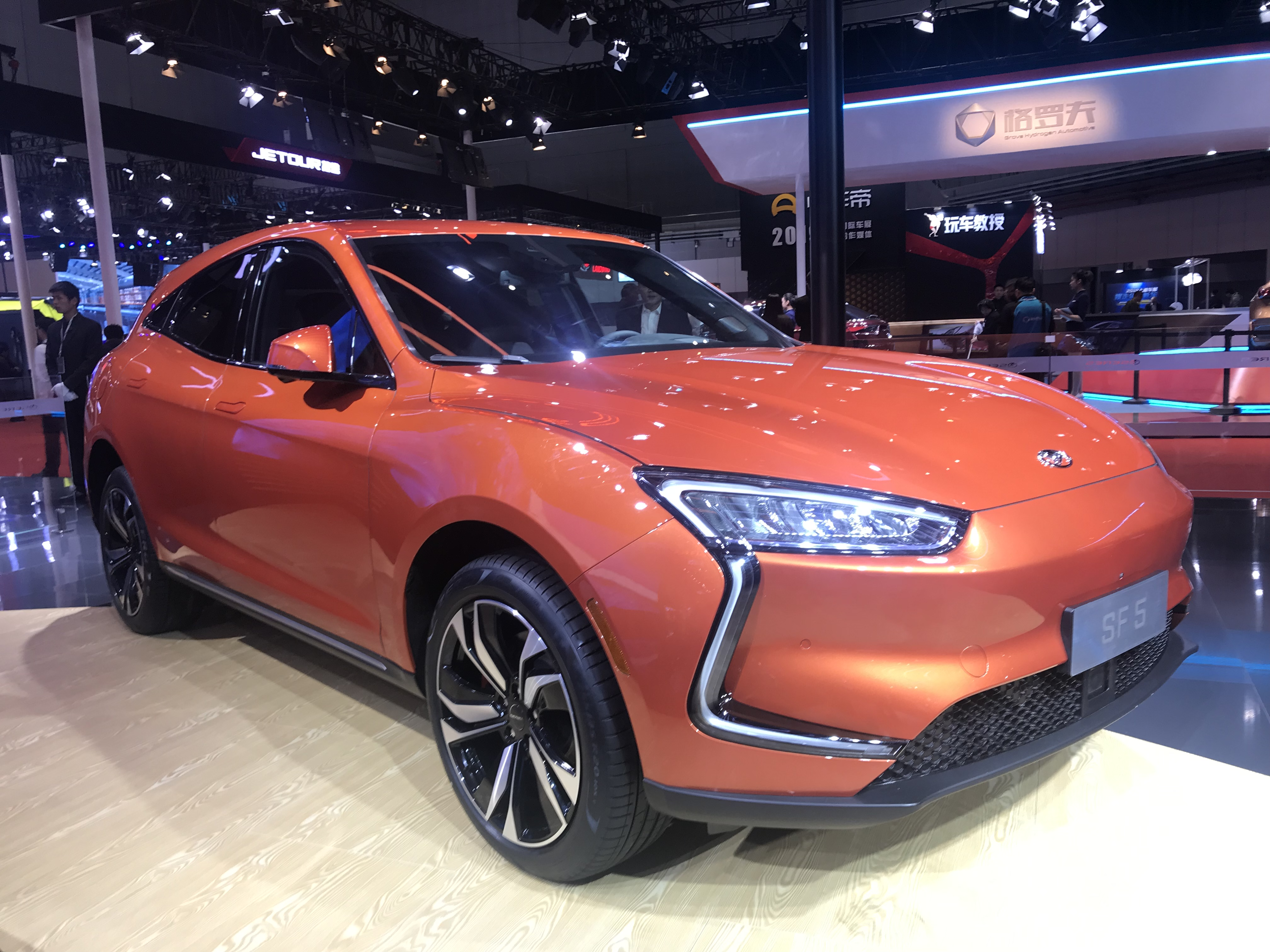

Overview
- Manufacturer: Seres
- Also called: DFSK Seres 5; Seres A5; Seres 5 (Europe); Evolute i-Jet (Russia); NWTN One (UAE)
- Production: 2019–present
- Assembly: China: Chongqing (Chongqing Jinkang New Energy Automobile Co., Ltd.)

Body and chassis
- Class: Compact crossover SUV
- Body style: 5-door SUV
- Layout: Front-engine, rear-motor, rear-wheel-drive; Front-engine, dual motor, four-wheel-drive; Rear motor, rear-wheel-drive; Dual motor, four-wheel-drive
- Related: AITO M5

Powertrain
- Engine: 1.5 L SFG15TR I4 turbo (petrol; generator only)
- Electric motor: AC synchronous (generator); SEP200 asynchronous; Huawei DriveONE
- Power output: 82 kW (111 PS; 110 hp) (Engine); 165 kW (224 PS; 221 hp) to 258.7 kW (352 PS; 347 hp) (RWD); 365 kW (496 PS; 489 hp) to 405.5 kW (551 PS; 544 hp) (4WD)
- Transmission: Single-speed automatic
- Hybrid drivetrain: Plug-in series hybrid
- Battery: 40 kWh NMC (EREV); 88 kWh LFP (BEV)
- Electric range: 180 kilometres (110 mi) (EREV); 500 kilometres (310 mi) CLTC (BEV)

Dimensions
- Wheelbase: 2,875 mm (113.2 in)
- Length: 4,700 mm (185.0 in)
- Width: 1,930 mm (76.0 in)
- Height: 1,625 mm (64.0 in)

The Seres SF5 is a compact crossover SUV available in battery-electric and Range extender powertrains produced by Seres since 2019. It was introduced at Auto Guangzhou in 2019.

== Overview ==
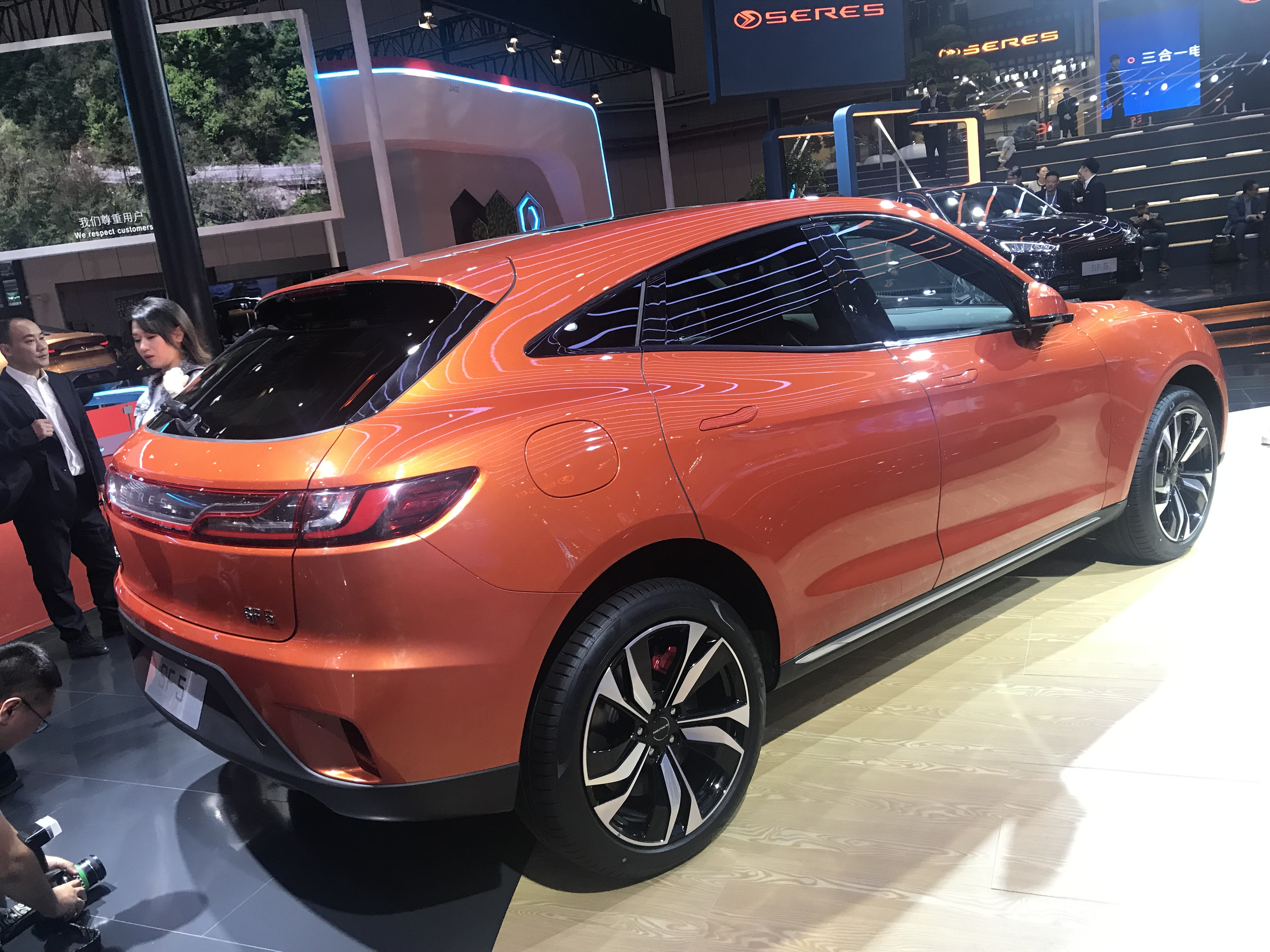
Seres SF5 rear

The Seres SF5 was initially unveiled as a concept in 2018 alongside the SF7, however, this was revised to the production SF5 in early 2019. The SF5 has a 17-inch screen on the center console, and is one of the first vehicles to ever utilize the Ali OS 2.0 infotainment system.

The tire dimensions of the SF5 are 255/45 R20 and 255/40 R21. The 2WD model is powered by one motor and the AWD model is powered by two motors with the motor capable of producing a maximum of 116 horsepower (87 kW; 118 PS). The range extended versions is equipped with a SFG15TR 1.5-litre engine producing 82 kW (110 hp; 111 PS) as the range extender with the combined fuel consumption of 1.1 L/100 km (260 mpg_{‑imp}; 210 mpg_{‑US}) and 1.2 L/100 km (240 mpg_{‑imp}; 200 mpg_{‑US}) for the 2WD and AWD models.

Mass production version has a price range from 278,000 to 458,000 yuan.

=== Seres A5 ===
Seres A5 (or Seres 5 in European market) is the global variant of the Seres SF5.

The exterior design of A5 is very similar to the SF5, with a 10 mm (0.39 in) increase in length compared to the SF5 and a 5 mm (0.20 in) reduction in height. The weight of the A5 is 2,220–2,360 kg (4,890–5,200 lb).

The Seres A5 has a top speed of 180 km/h (110 mph). The front-wheel-drive model is equipped with a Seres built SEP200 motor and boasts a maximum power of 225 kW (302 hp; 306 PS), and the dual motor AWD version uses two motors (SEP200 front/SEP201 rear) and reaches maximum power of 405 kW (543 hp; 551 PS).

The Seres A5 is equipped with a lithium iron phosphate battery by CATL, whereas SF5 uses a lithium nickel manganese cobalt battery.

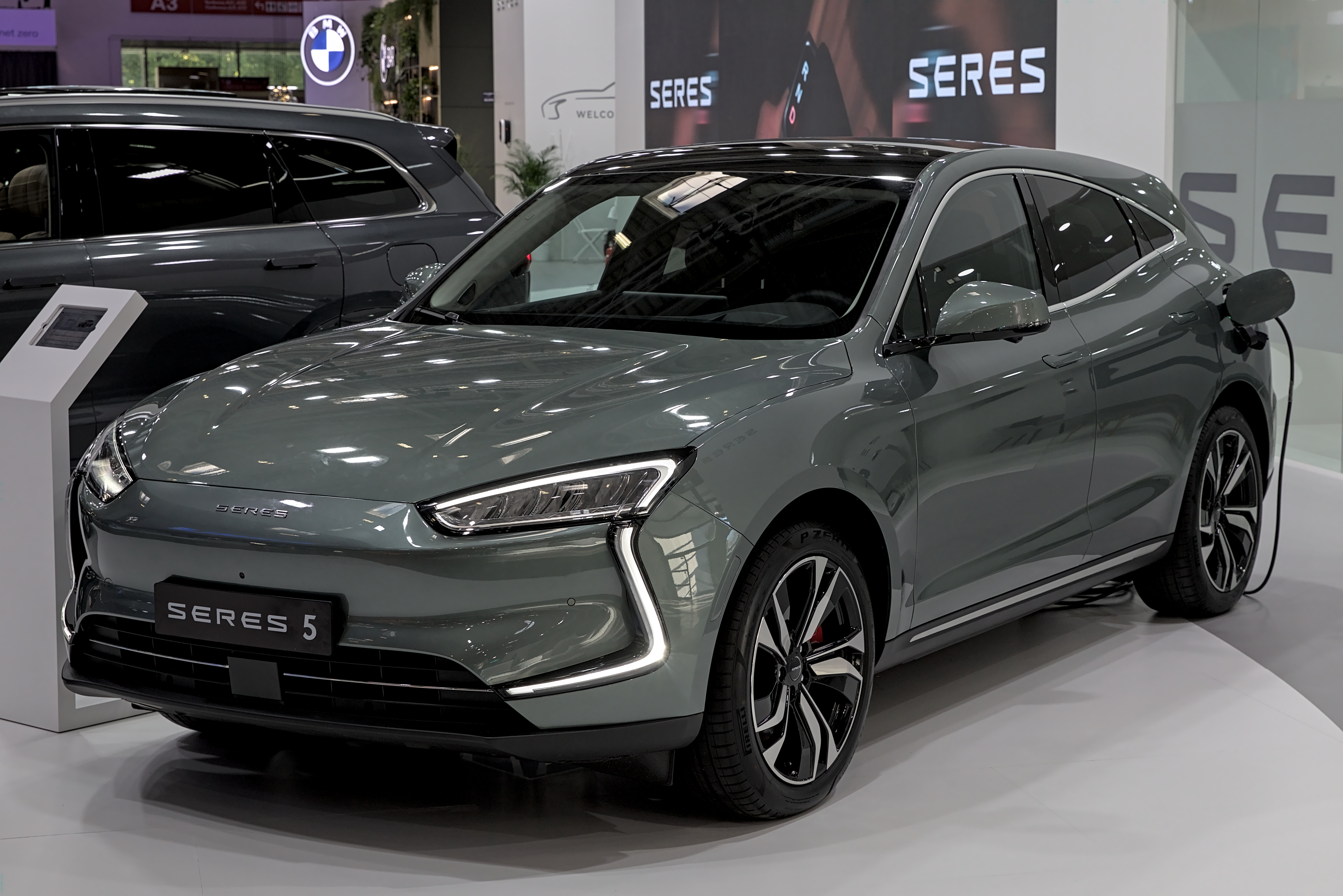
Seres A5/5

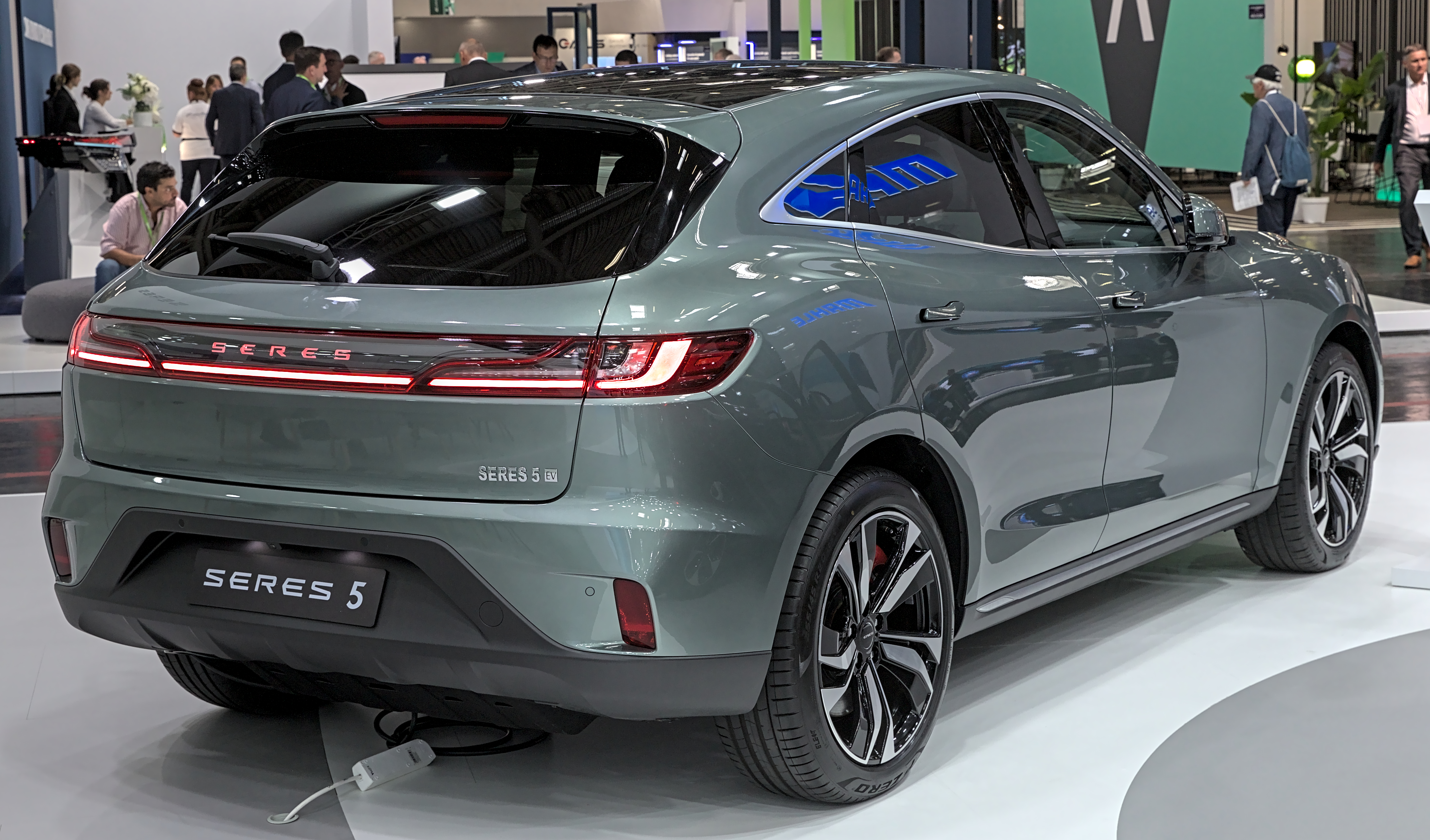
Seres A5/5 rear

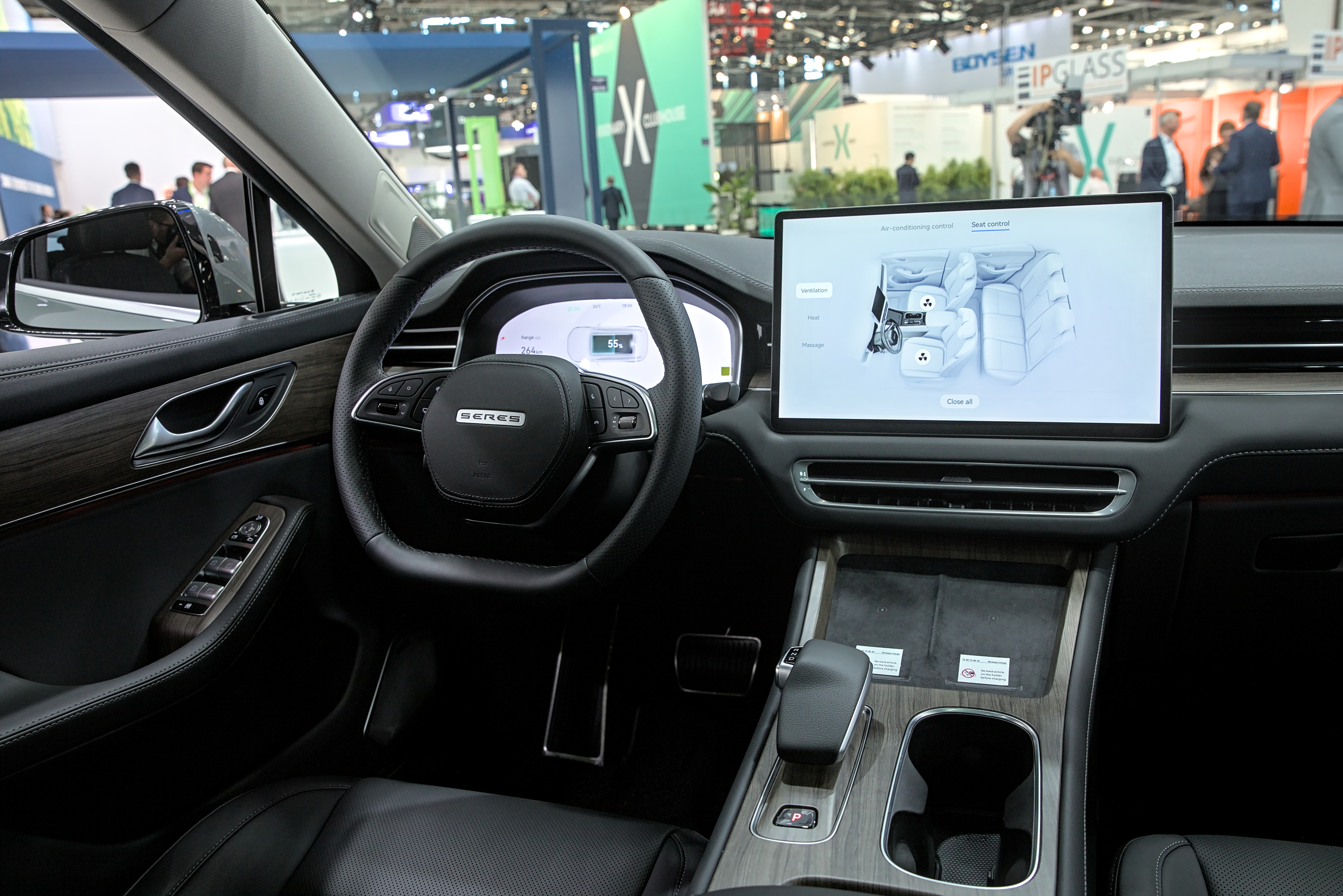
Interior

=== Powertrain ===
Model	Type	Engine (generator)	Motor	Power	Torque
SF5 RWD	EREV	1.5 L SFG15TR I4 (turbo petrol) 82 kW (111 PS; 110 hp)	Rear: 255 kW Seres SEP200	255 kW (342 hp)	520 N⋅m (384 lb⋅ft)
A5 RWD	BEV	—	Rear: 255 kW Seres SEP200	255 kW (342 hp)	520 N⋅m (384 lb⋅ft)
SF5 AWD	EREV	1.5 L SFG15TR I4 (turbo petrol) 82 kW (111 PS; 110 hp)	Front: 220 kW Seres SEP201 Rear: 255 kW Seres SEP200	405 kW (543 hp)	820 N⋅m (605 lb⋅ft)
A5 AWD	BEV	—	Front: 220 kW Seres SEP201 Rear: 255 kW Seres SEP200	475 kW (637 hp)	820 N⋅m (605 lb⋅ft)

== AITO M5 ==
In December 2021 an extensively modified version of the SF5 was presented as the AITO M5, developed in cooperation with Huawei. The model was the first car of the Aito brand, which stands for “Adding Intelligence to Auto”.

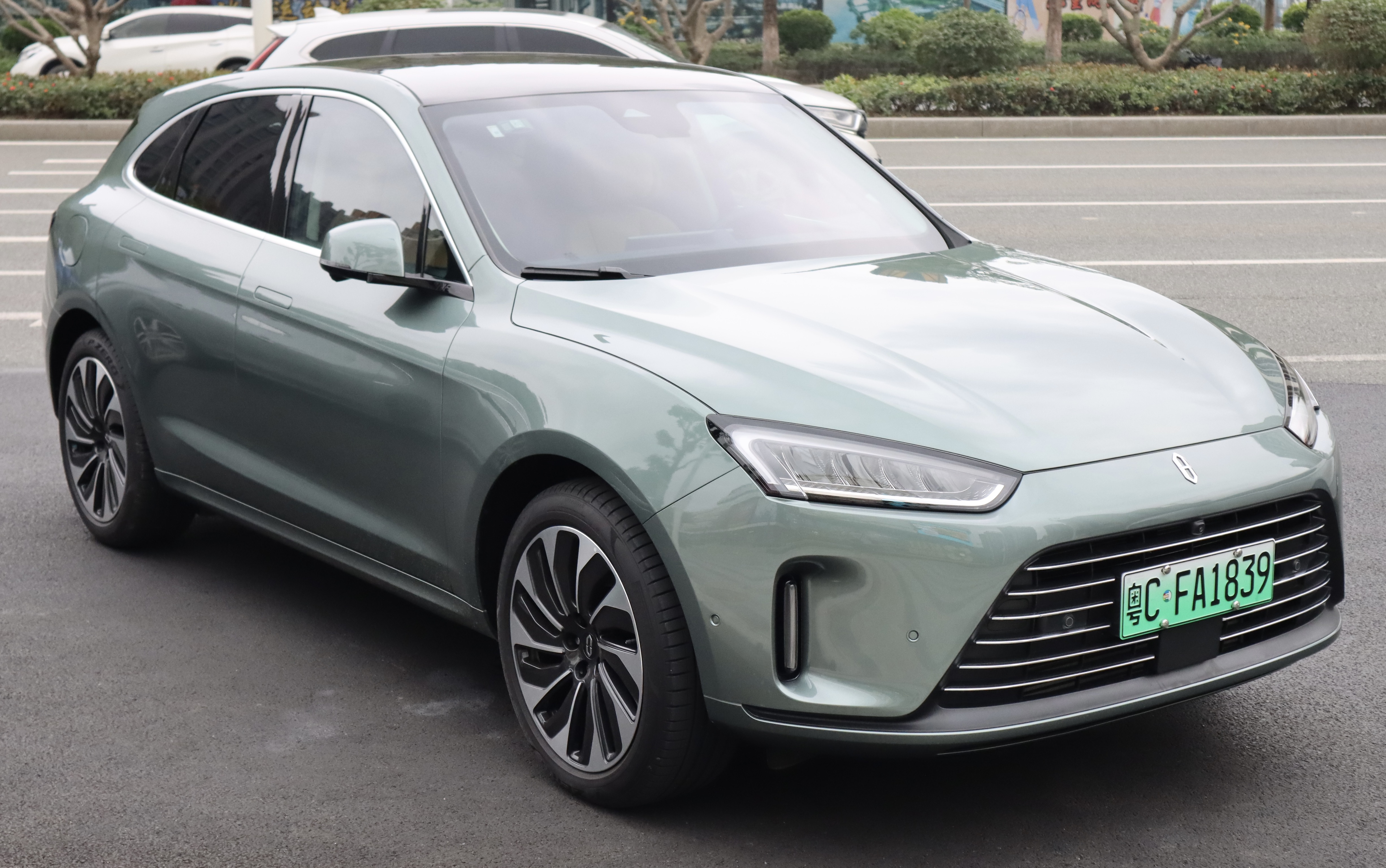
AITO M5

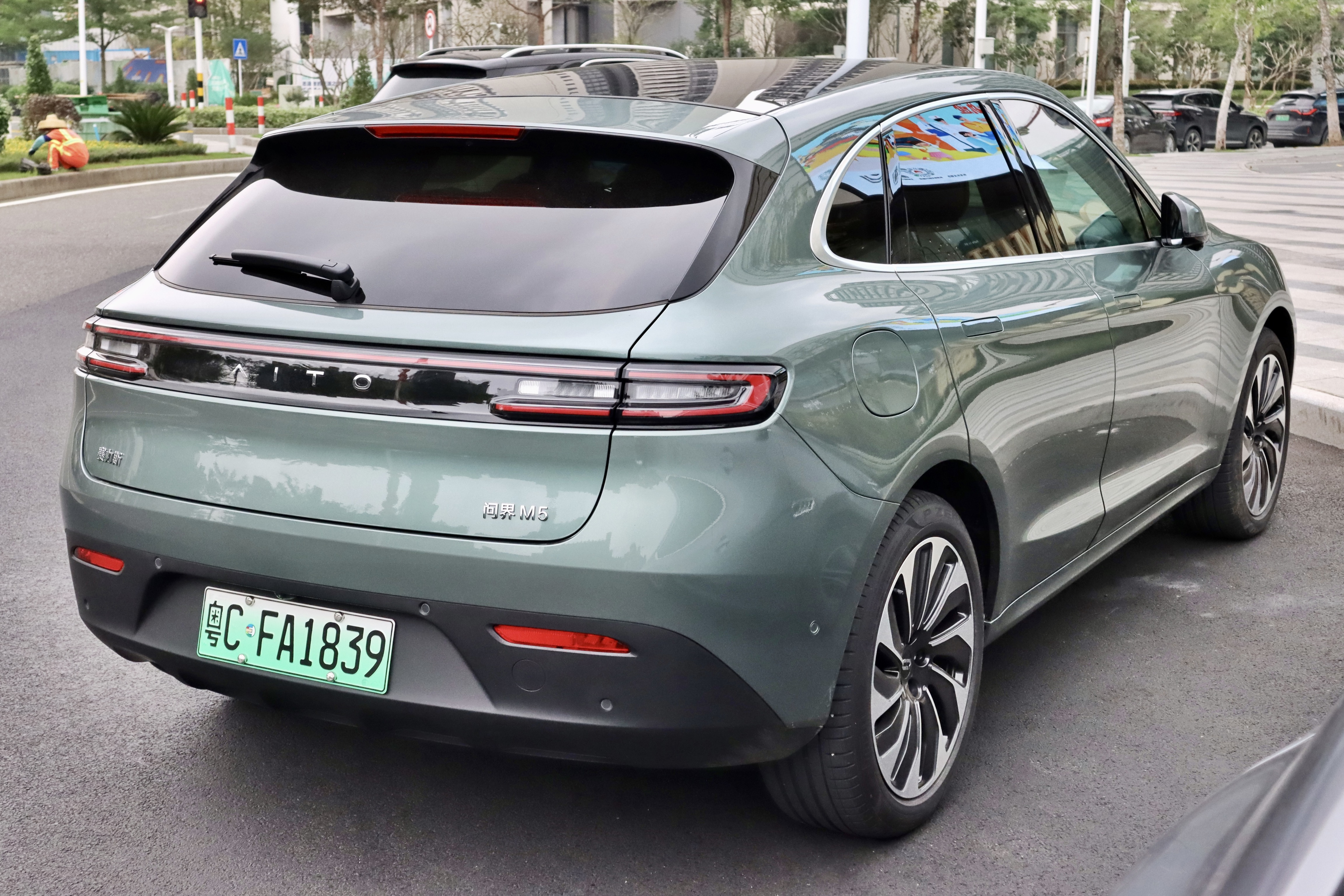
AITO M5 rear

== Sales ==
Year	China
2020	732
2021	8,169
2022	51
2023	3,357
2024	693
