= PICALM =

Protein-coding gene in the species Homo sapiens

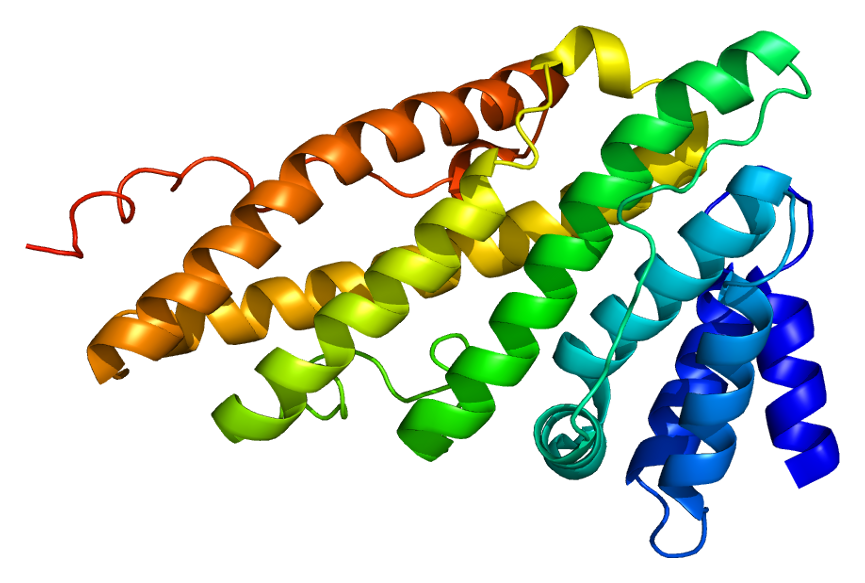

Identifiers
- Aliases: PICALM, CALM, CLTH, LAP, phosphatidylinositol binding clathrin assembly protein
- External IDs: OMIM: 603025; MGI: 2385902; HomoloGene: 111783; GeneCards: PICALM; OMA:PICALM - orthologs

Gene location (Human)
Chr.	Chromosome 11 (human)
Band	11q14.2	Start	85,957,175 bp
Band	11q14.2	End	86,069,882 bp

Gene location (Mouse)
Chr.	Chromosome 7 (mouse)
Band	7 D3|7 50.47 cM	Start	89,779,421 bp
Band	7 D3|7 50.47 cM	End	89,862,673 bp
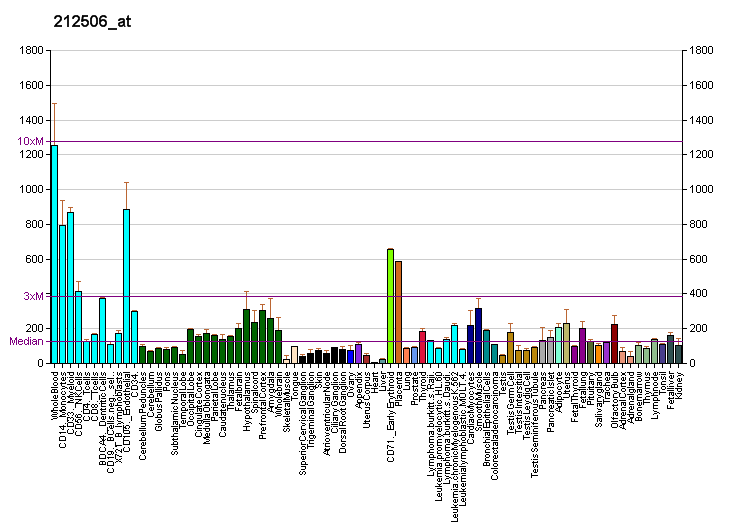

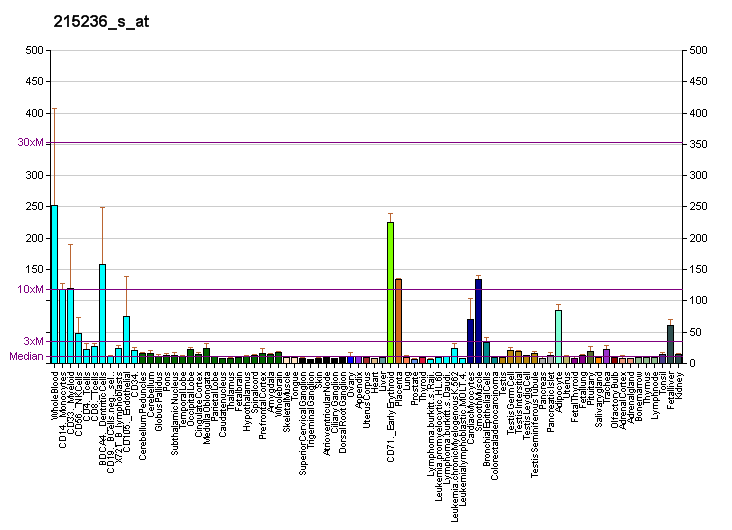

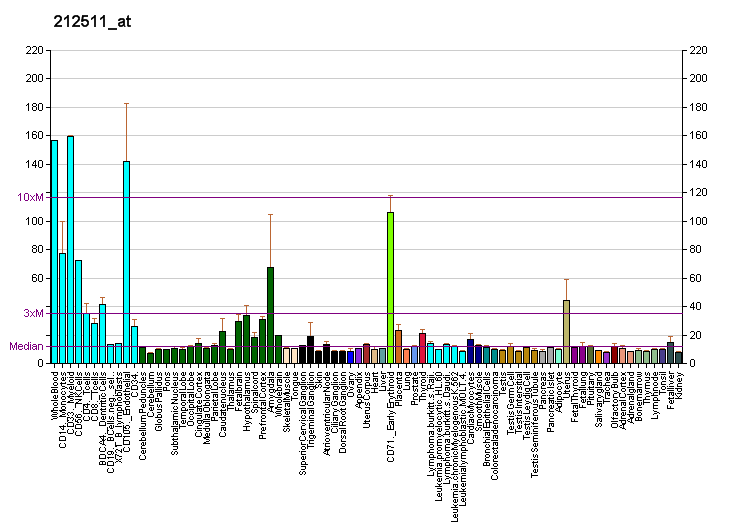
RNA expression pattern
Bgee	Human / Mouse (ortholog); Top expressed in: Achilles tendon; tibial arteries; corpus callosum; subcutaneous adipose tissue; gallbladder; tibial nerve; monocyte; right coronary artery; C1 segment; ascending aorta / Top expressed in: fetal liver hematopoietic progenitor cell; interventricular septum; tibiofemoral joint; stroma of bone marrow; left lung lobe; human fetus; umbilical cord; body of femur; genital tubercle; tunica media of zone of aorta; More reference expression data
BioGPS	More reference expression data
Gene ontology
Molecular function	clathrin heavy chain binding; clathrin adaptor activity; clathrin binding; 1-phosphatidylinositol binding; protein binding; phospholipid binding; cadherin binding; SNARE binding; amyloid-beta binding; phosphatidylinositol-4,5-bisphosphate binding; tau protein binding; low-density lipoprotein particle receptor binding
Cellular component	clathrin coat of coated pit; Golgi apparatus; postsynaptic membrane; membrane; neurofibrillary tangle; soma; clathrin-coated pit; AP-2 adaptor complex; presynaptic membrane; cytoplasmic vesicle; nucleus; clathrin-coated vesicle; intracellular anatomical structure; vesicle; perinuclear region of cytoplasm; cytosol; intracellular membrane-bounded organelle; early endosome; plasma membrane; cell surface; intrinsic component of membrane; clathrin-coated endocytic vesicle; endosome to plasma membrane transport vesicle; synaptic vesicle; extrinsic component of presynaptic endocytic zone membrane
Biological process	regulation of endocytosis; endocytosis; iron ion homeostasis; receptor internalization; positive regulation of neuron death; regulation of aspartic-type endopeptidase activity involved in amyloid precursor protein catabolic process; negative regulation of gene expression; regulation of protein localization; negative regulation of receptor-mediated endocytosis; positive regulation of transcription, DNA-templated; endosomal transport; clathrin coat assembly; cell population proliferation; vesicle-mediated transport; axonogenesis; hemopoiesis; clathrin-dependent endocytosis; negative regulation of metalloendopeptidase activity involved in amyloid precursor protein catabolic process; synaptic vesicle maturation; positive regulation of aspartic-type endopeptidase activity involved in amyloid precursor protein catabolic process; vesicle cargo loading; receptor-mediated endocytosis; dendrite morphogenesis; positive regulation of amyloid-beta formation; membrane organization; iron ion import across plasma membrane; vesicle budding from membrane; learning or memory; positive regulation of GTPase activity; protein-containing complex assembly; regulation of vesicle size; membrane bending; amyloid-beta clearance by transcytosis; regulation of amyloid-beta formation; negative regulation of protein localization to plasma membrane; clathrin-coated pit assembly; negative regulation of protein localization to cell surface; synaptic vesicle budding from presynaptic endocytic zone membrane; synaptic vesicle endocytosis
Sources:Amigo / QuickGO
Orthologs
Species	Human	Mouse
Entrez	8301	233489
Ensembl	ENSG00000073921	ENSMUSG00000039361
UniProt	Q13492	Q7M6Y3
RefSeq (mRNA)	NM_001008660; NM_001206946; NM_001206947; NM_007166	NM_001252520; NM_001252521; NM_001252522; NM_001252523; NM_001252524 NM_146194; NM_001360867
RefSeq (protein)	NP_001008660; NP_001193875; NP_001193876; NP_009097; NP_001008660.1	NP_001239449; NP_001239450; NP_001239451; NP_001239452; NP_001239453 NP_666306; NP_001347796
Location (UCSC)	Chr 11: 85.96 – 86.07 Mb	Chr 7: 89.78 – 89.86 Mb
PubMed search
- Wikidata
View/Edit Human	View/Edit Mouse

Phosphatidylinositol binding clathrin assembly protein, also known as PICALM, is a protein which in humans is encoded by the PICALM gene.

== Interactions ==
PICALM has been shown to interact with CLTC.

== Clinical significance ==
In humans, certain alleles of this gene have been statistically associated with an increased risk of developing late-onset Alzheimer's disease.
