= REPS2 =

Protein-coding gene in the species Homo sapiens

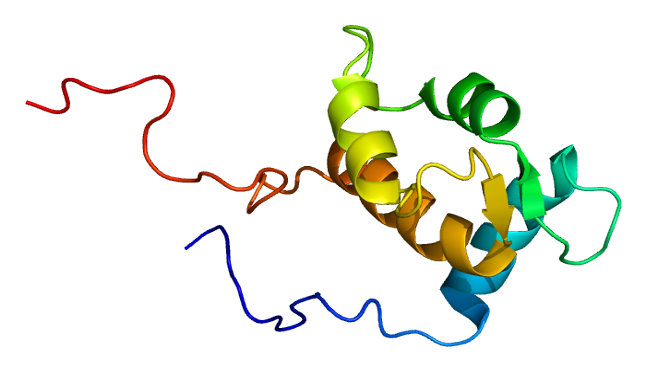

Identifiers
- Aliases: REPS2, POB1, RALBP1 associated Eps domain containing 2
- External IDs: OMIM: 300317; MGI: 2663511; GeneCards: REPS2
Available structures
PDB	Ortholog search: PDBe RCSB
PDB	List of PDB id codes 1IQ3

Gene location (Human)
Chr.	X chromosome (human)
Band	Xp22.2	Start	16,946,658 bp
Band	Xp22.2	End	17,153,272 bp

Gene location (Mouse)
Chr.	X chromosome (mouse)
Band	X|X F4	Start	161,194,950 bp
Band	X|X F4	End	161,426,645 bp
RNA expression pattern
Bgee	Human / Mouse (ortholog); Top expressed in: middle temporal gyrus; corpus epididymis; lateral nuclear group of thalamus; Brodmann area 23; postcentral gyrus; sural nerve; superior frontal gyrus; blood; pons; corpus callosum / Top expressed in: medial dorsal nucleus; medial geniculate nucleus; lateral geniculate nucleus; subiculum; olfactory tubercle; primary motor cortex; mammillary body; anterior amygdaloid area; inferior colliculi; lateral septal nucleus; More reference expression data
BioGPS	n/a
Gene ontology
Molecular function	calcium ion binding; protein binding; metal ion binding
Cellular component	cytoplasm; cytosol
Biological process	epidermal growth factor receptor signaling pathway; membrane organization; protein-containing complex assembly
Sources:Amigo / QuickGO
Orthologs
Databases	NCBI: entry; OMA: entry
Species	Human	Mouse
Entrez	9185	194590
Ensembl	ENSG00000169891	ENSMUSG00000040855
UniProt	Q8NFH8	Q80XA6
RefSeq (mRNA)	NM_001080975; NM_004726	NM_001290633; NM_178256; NM_001359102; NM_001359103; NM_001359104
RefSeq (protein)	NP_001074444; NP_004717	NP_001277562; NP_839987; NP_001346031; NP_001346032; NP_001346033 NP_001390994; NP_001390995; NP_001390996; NP_001390997; NP_001390998
Location (UCSC)	Chr X: 16.95 – 17.15 Mb	Chr X: 161.19 – 161.43 Mb
PubMed search
- Wikidata
View/Edit Human	View/Edit Mouse

RalBP1-associated Eps domain-containing protein 2 is a protein that in humans is encoded by the REPS2 gene.

== Function ==
The product of this gene is part of a protein complex that regulates the endocytosis of growth factor receptors. The encoded protein directly interacts with a GTPase activating protein that functions downstream of the small G protein Ral. Its expression can negatively affect receptor internalization and inhibit growth factor signaling. Multiple transcript variants encoding different isoforms have been found for this gene.

== Interactions ==
REPS2 has been shown to interact with EPN1, EPS15 and RALBP1.
