= USP8 =

Protein-coding gene in the species Homo sapiens

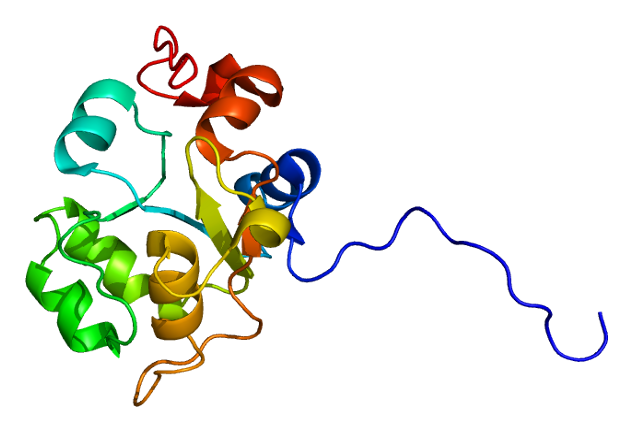

Identifiers
- Aliases: USP8, HumORF8, SPG59, UBPY, ubiquitin specific peptidase 8, PITA4
- External IDs: OMIM: 603158; MGI: 1934029; GeneCards: USP8
Available structures
PDB	Ortholog search: PDBe RCSB
PDB	List of PDB id codes 1WHB, 2A9U, 2GFO, 2GWF, 3N3K
Enzyme activity
EC #	BRENDA	ExPASy	KEGG	MetaCyc
3.4.19.12	↗	↗	↗	↗

Gene location (Human)
Chr.	Chromosome 15 (human)
Band	15q21.2	Start	50,424,380 bp
Band	15q21.2	End	50,514,421 bp

Gene location (Mouse)
Chr.	Chromosome 2 (mouse)
Band	2|2 F1	Start	126,549,248 bp
Band	2|2 F1	End	126,601,217 bp
RNA expression pattern
Bgee	Human / Mouse (ortholog); Top expressed in: Achilles tendon; sural nerve; epithelium of colon; ventricular zone; testicle; rectum; monocyte; caput epididymis; corpus epididymis; gallbladder / Top expressed in: spermatid; seminiferous tubule; spermatocyte; tail of embryo; genital tubercle; right kidney; stroma of bone marrow; zygote; deep cerebellar nuclei; medial vestibular nucleus; More reference expression data
BioGPS	n/a
Gene ontology
Molecular function	cysteine-type peptidase activity; SH3 domain binding; thiol-dependent deubiquitinase; peptidase activity; protein binding; cysteine-type endopeptidase activity; hydrolase activity; cadherin binding
Cellular component	cytoplasm; endosome; membrane; plasma membrane; extrinsic component of endosome membrane; midbody; endosome membrane; extrinsic component of plasma membrane; nucleus; postsynaptic density; dendritic spine; early endosome; cytosol; glutamatergic synapse
Biological process	protein K48-linked deubiquitination; ubiquitin-dependent protein catabolic process; mitotic cytokinesis; endosome organization; proteolysis; protein K63-linked deubiquitination; cell cycle; cell population proliferation; protein deubiquitination; cellular response to dexamethasone stimulus; cellular response to nerve growth factor stimulus; positive regulation of canonical Wnt signaling pathway; Ras protein signal transduction; regulation of protein stability; regulation of protein localization; regulation of protein catabolic process at postsynapse, modulating synaptic transmission
Sources:Amigo / QuickGO
Orthologs
Databases	NCBI: entry; OMA: entry
Species	Human	Mouse
Entrez	9101	84092
Ensembl	ENSG00000138592	ENSMUSG00000027363
UniProt	P40818	Q80U87
RefSeq (mRNA)	NM_001128610; NM_001128611; NM_001283049; NM_005154	NM_001252580; NM_019729
RefSeq (protein)	NP_001122082; NP_001269978; NP_005145	NP_001239509; NP_062703
Location (UCSC)	Chr 15: 50.42 – 50.51 Mb	Chr 2: 126.55 – 126.6 Mb
PubMed search
- Wikidata
View/Edit Human	View/Edit Mouse

Ubiquitin carboxyl-terminal hydrolase 8 is an enzyme that in humans is encoded by the USP8 gene.

== Interactions ==
USP8 has been shown to interact with RNF41 and STAM2.

== Diseases ==
In a few cases of Morbus Cushing's disease, a mutation of USP8 has been found.
