= EPN1 =

Protein-coding gene in the species Homo sapiens

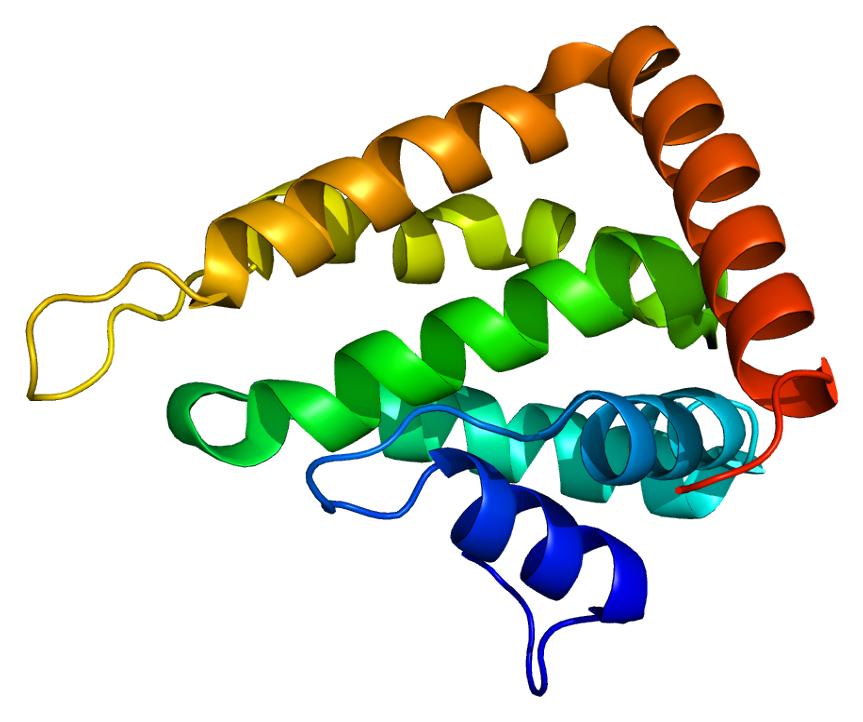

Identifiers
- Aliases: EPN1, epsin 1
- External IDs: OMIM: 607262; MGI: 1333763; GeneCards: EPN1
Available structures
PDB	Ortholog search: PDBe RCSB
PDB	List of PDB id codes 1INZ

Gene location (Human)
Chr.	Chromosome 19 (human)
Band	19q13.42	Start	55,675,226 bp
Band	19q13.42	End	55,709,858 bp

Gene location (Mouse)
Chr.	Chromosome 7 (mouse)
Band	7|7 A1	Start	5,080,235 bp
Band	7|7 A1	End	5,098,178 bp
RNA expression pattern
Bgee	Human / Mouse (ortholog); Top expressed in: apex of heart; body of stomach; mucosa of transverse colon; right frontal lobe; right auricle of heart; anterior cingulate cortex; left testis; muscle of thigh; right testis; body of pancreas / Top expressed in: Ileal epithelium; perirhinal cortex; CA3 field; entorhinal cortex; primary visual cortex; superior frontal gyrus; dentate gyrus of hippocampal formation granule cell; lactiferous gland; choroid plexus of fourth ventricle; ankle joint; More reference expression data
BioGPS	n/a
Gene ontology
Molecular function	protein binding; lipid binding
Cellular component	cytoplasm; plasma membrane; clathrin-coated pit; membrane; nucleus; cytosol
Biological process	Notch signaling pathway; female pregnancy; negative regulation of epidermal growth factor receptor signaling pathway; in utero embryonic development; endocytosis; embryonic organ development; membrane organization; negative regulation of sprouting angiogenesis
Sources:Amigo / QuickGO
Orthologs
Databases	NCBI: entry; OMA: entry
Species	Human	Mouse
Entrez	29924	13854
Ensembl	ENSG00000063245	ENSMUSG00000035203
UniProt	Q9Y6I3	Q80VP1
RefSeq (mRNA)	NM_001130071; NM_001130072; NM_013333; NM_001321263	NM_001252454; NM_010147
RefSeq (protein)	NP_001123543; NP_001123544; NP_001308192; NP_037465	NP_001239383; NP_034277; NP_001359429
Location (UCSC)	Chr 19: 55.68 – 55.71 Mb	Chr 7: 5.08 – 5.1 Mb
PubMed search
- Wikidata
View/Edit Human	View/Edit Mouse

Epsin-1 is a protein that in humans is encoded by the EPN1 gene.

EPN1 is an endocytic accessory protein that interacts with EPS15 (MIM 600051), the alpha subunit of the clathrin adaptor AP2 (AP2A1; MIM 601026), and clathrin (see MIM 118960), as well as with other accessory proteins for the endocytosis of clathrin-coated vesicles.[supplied by OMIM]

== Interactions ==
EPN1 has been shown to interact with REPS2, AP2A2 and EPS15.
