= AP2A2 =

Protein-coding gene in the species Homo sapiens

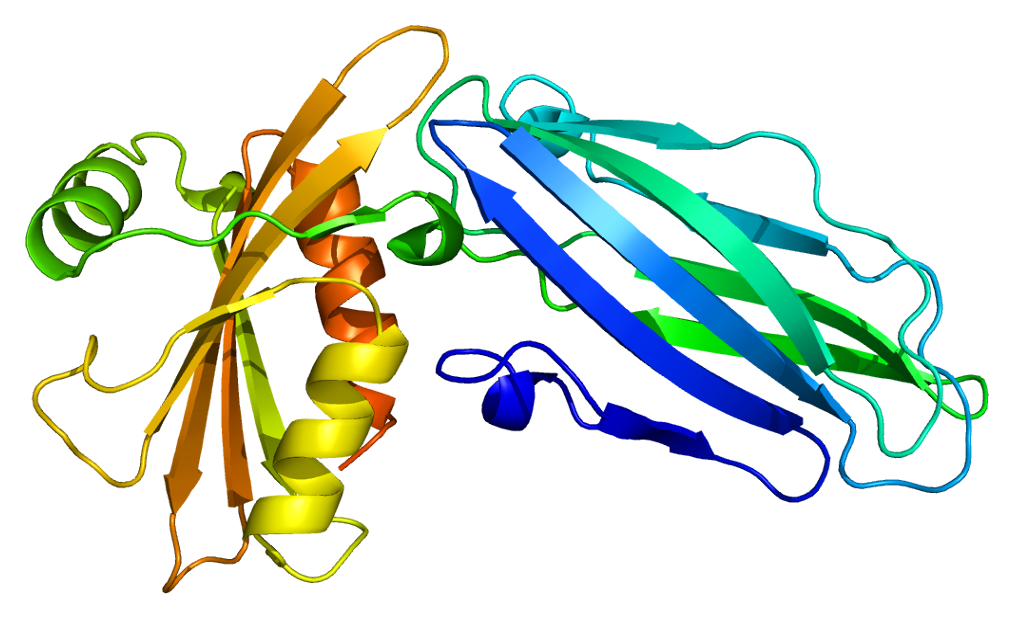

Identifiers
- Aliases: AP2A2, ADTAB, CLAPA2, HIP-9, HIP9, HYPJ, adaptor related protein complex 2 alpha 2 subunit, adaptor related protein complex 2 subunit alpha 2
- External IDs: OMIM: 607242; MGI: 101920; GeneCards: AP2A2
Available structures
PDB	Ortholog search: PDBe RCSB
PDB	List of PDB id codes 1B9K, 1KY6, 1KY7, 1KYD, 1KYF, 1KYU, 1QTP, 1QTS, 1W80, 2JKR, 2JKT, 2VJ0, 3HS8

Gene location (Human)
Chr.	Chromosome 11 (human)
Band	11p15.5	Start	924,881 bp
Band	11p15.5	End	1,012,245 bp

Gene location (Mouse)
Chr.	Chromosome 7 (mouse)
Band	7|7 F5	Start	141,142,086 bp
Band	7|7 F5	End	141,212,924 bp
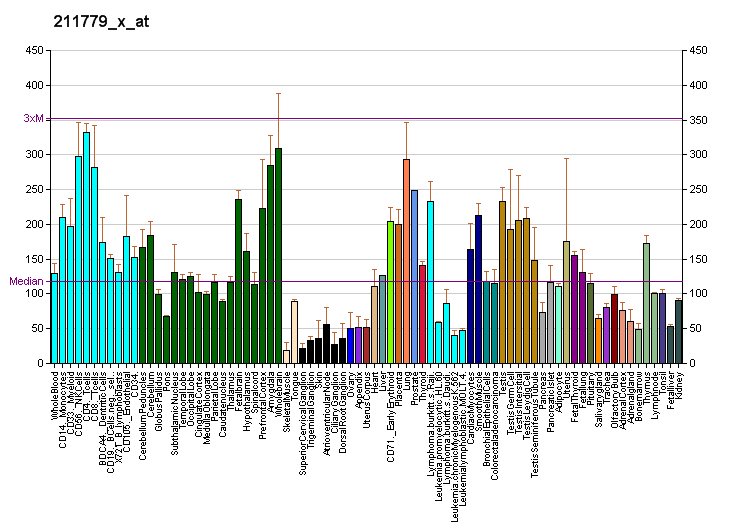

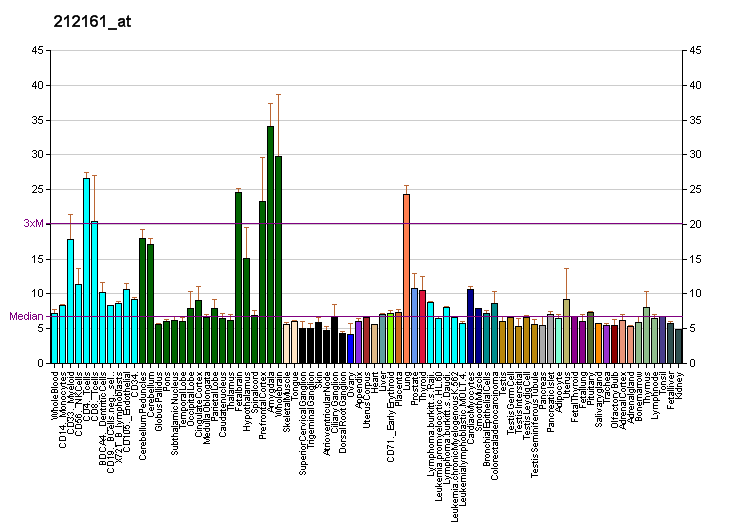

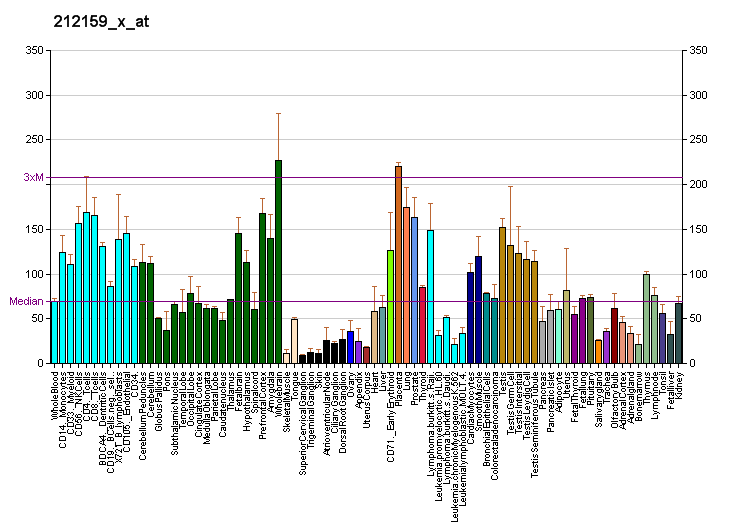
RNA expression pattern
Bgee	Human / Mouse (ortholog); Top expressed in: right hemisphere of cerebellum; spleen; superior frontal gyrus; sural nerve; right frontal lobe; subcutaneous adipose tissue; prefrontal cortex; canal of the cervix; pituitary gland; ganglionic eminence / Top expressed in: perirhinal cortex; entorhinal cortex; neural layer of retina; dentate gyrus of hippocampal formation granule cell; stroma of bone marrow; CA3 field; medullary collecting duct; superior frontal gyrus; primary visual cortex; cerebellar cortex; More reference expression data
BioGPS	More reference expression data
Gene ontology
Molecular function	clathrin adaptor activity; protein binding; protein kinase binding; lipid binding; protein domain specific binding; disordered domain specific binding; molecular function
Cellular component	endocytic vesicle membrane; cytosol; clathrin-coated endocytic vesicle membrane; membrane; plasma membrane; endolysosome membrane; membrane coat; clathrin-coated pit; AP-2 adaptor complex; clathrin adaptor complex; secretory granule membrane; cytoplasmic vesicle; ficolin-1-rich granule membrane; clathrin-coated endocytic vesicle
Biological process	endocytosis; antigen processing and presentation of exogenous peptide antigen via MHC class II; ephrin receptor signaling pathway; mitigation of host defenses by virus; clathrin-dependent endocytosis; protein transport; intracellular protein transport; vesicle-mediated transport; microtubule-based movement; Wnt signaling pathway, planar cell polarity pathway; neutrophil degranulation; membrane organization; low-density lipoprotein particle receptor catabolic process; low-density lipoprotein particle clearance; transport
Sources:Amigo / QuickGO
Orthologs
Databases	NCBI: entry; OMA: entry
Species	Human	Mouse
Entrez	161	11772
Ensembl	ENSG00000281385; ENSG00000280759; ENSG00000183020	ENSMUSG00000002957
UniProt	O94973	P17427
RefSeq (mRNA)	NM_001242837; NM_012305	NM_007459; NM_001357068
RefSeq (protein)	NP_001229766; NP_036437	NP_031485; NP_001343997
Location (UCSC)	Chr 11: 0.92 – 1.01 Mb	Chr 7: 141.14 – 141.21 Mb
PubMed search
- Wikidata
View/Edit Human	View/Edit Mouse

AP-2 complex subunit alpha-2 is a protein that in humans is encoded by the AP2A2 gene.

== Interactions ==
AP2A2 has been shown to interact with EPN1 and SHC1.
