= RNF41 =

Protein-coding gene in the species Homo sapiens

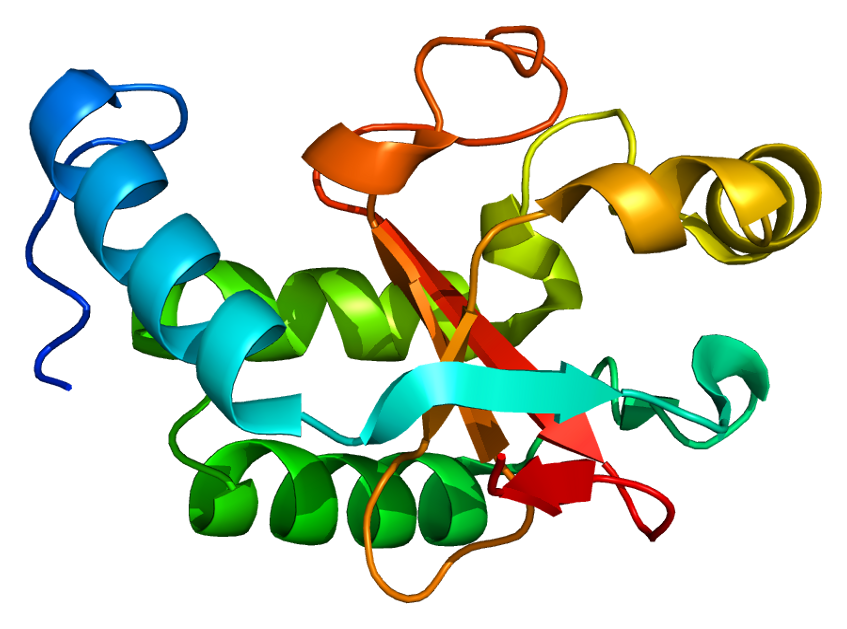

Identifiers
- Aliases: RNF41, FLRF, NRDP1, SBBI03, ring finger protein 41
- External IDs: MGI: 1914838; GeneCards: RNF41
Available structures
| PDB | Ortholog search: PDBe RCSB |
| PDB | List of PDB id codes 2FZP, 2GWF |
Enzyme activity
| EC # | BRENDA | ExPASy | KEGG | MetaCyc |
|---|---|---|---|---|
| 2.3.2.27 | ↗ | ↗ | ↗ | ↗ |

Gene location (Human)
| Chr. | Chromosome 12 (human) |
| Band | 12q13.3 | Start | 56,202,179 bp |
| Band | 12q13.3 | End | 56,221,933 bp |

Gene location (Mouse)
| Chr. | Chromosome 10 (mouse) |
| Band | 10 D3|10 76.55 cM | Start | 128,247,526 bp |
| Band | 10 D3|10 76.55 cM | End | 128,277,310 bp |
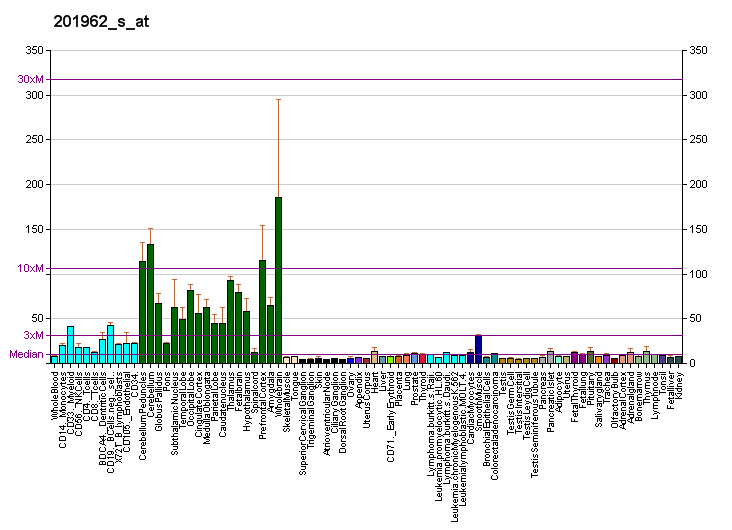

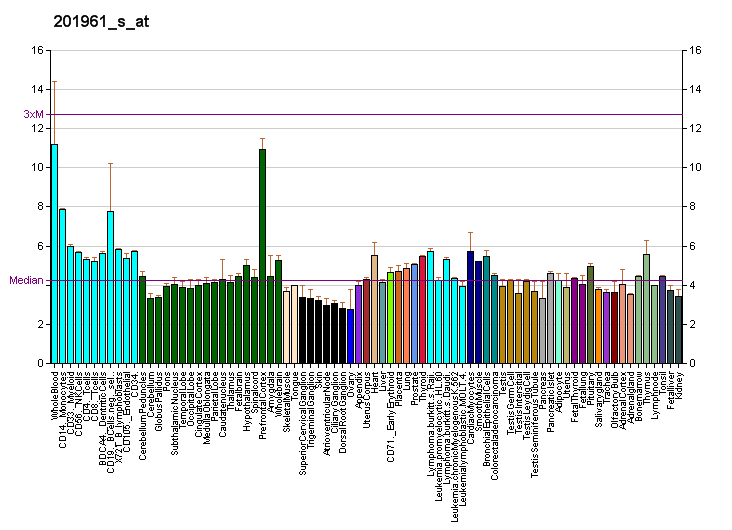
RNA expression pattern
| Bgee | Human / Mouse (ortholog); Top expressed in: Brodmann area 10; paraflocculus of cerebellum; frontal pole; islet of Langerhans; monocyte; lateral nuclear group of thalamus; stromal cell of endometrium; gallbladder; right coronary artery; popliteal artery / Top expressed in: seminiferous tubule; dentate gyrus of hippocampal formation granule cell; primary visual cortex; spermatid; superior frontal gyrus; ventricular zone; granulocyte; ganglionic eminence; Rostral migratory stream; cerebellar cortex; More reference expression data |
| BioGPS | More reference expression data |
Gene ontology
| Molecular function | interleukin-3 receptor binding; erythropoietin receptor binding; zinc ion binding; metal ion binding; protein binding; transferase activity; ubiquitin-protein transferase activity; protein domain specific binding; receptor tyrosine kinase binding; ubiquitin protein ligase activity |
| Cellular component | cytosol; perinuclear region of cytoplasm; endoplasmic reticulum tubular network |
| Biological process | regulation of MAPK cascade; extrinsic apoptotic signaling pathway; positive regulation of DNA-binding transcription factor activity; protein polyubiquitination; regulation of reactive oxygen species metabolic process; autophagy; negative regulation of cell migration; regulation of lymphocyte differentiation; positive regulation of reactive oxygen species metabolic process; protein ubiquitination; regulation of protein kinase B signaling; regulation of gene expression; proteasomal protein catabolic process; regulation of myeloid cell differentiation; regulation of establishment of cell polarity; negative regulation of cell population proliferation; protein autoubiquitination; apoptotic process; negative regulation of mitophagy; positive regulation of protein catabolic process |
Sources:Amigo / QuickGO
Orthologs
| Databases | NCBI: entry; OMA: entry |
| Species | Human | Mouse |
| Entrez | 10193 | 67588 |
| Ensembl | ENSG00000181852 | ENSMUSG00000025373 |
| UniProt | Q9H4P4 | Q8BH75 |
| RefSeq (mRNA) | NM_001242826; NM_005785; NM_194358; NM_194359 | NM_001164237; NM_026259 |
| RefSeq (protein) | NP_001229755; NP_005776; NP_919339; NP_919340 | NP_001157709; NP_080535 |
| Location (UCSC) | Chr 12: 56.2 – 56.22 Mb | Chr 10: 128.25 – 128.28 Mb |
| PubMed search |
- Wikidata
| View/Edit Human | View/Edit Mouse |

E3 ubiquitin-protein ligase NRDP1 is an enzyme that in humans is encoded by the RNF41 gene.

== Function ==
The protein encoded by this gene contains a RING finger, a motif present in a variety of functionally distinct proteins and known to be involved in protein-protein and protein-DNA interactions. The specific function of this protein has not yet been determined. Three alternatively spliced transcript variants encoding two distinct isoforms have been reported.

== Interactions ==
RNF41 has been shown to interact with USP8.

== See also ==
- RING finger domain
