= Tetratricopeptide repeat protein 39C =

Protein-coding gene in the species Homo sapiens

TTC39C

Identifiers
- Aliases: TTC39C, C18orf17, HsT2697, tetratricopeptide repeat domain 39C
- External IDs: MGI: 1919997; GeneCards: TTC39C

Gene location (Human)
Chr.	Chromosome 18 (human)
Band	18q11.2	Start	23,992,773 bp
Band	18q11.2	End	24,135,610 bp

Gene location (Mouse)
Chr.	Chromosome 18 (mouse)
Band	18|18 A1	Start	12,732,953 bp
Band	18|18 A1	End	12,871,920 bp
RNA expression pattern
Bgee	Human / Mouse (ortholog); Top expressed in: right lobe of liver; skin of abdomen; skin of leg; olfactory zone of nasal mucosa; skin of arm; left testis; right testis; granulocyte; left adrenal cortex; right adrenal gland / Top expressed in: left lobe of liver; neural layer of retina; spermatocyte; spermatid; lumbar spinal ganglion; right kidney; adrenal medulla; secondary oocyte; proximal tubule; dentate gyrus of hippocampal formation granule cell; More reference expression data
BioGPS	n/a
Orthologs
Databases	NCBI: entry; OMA: entry
Species	Human	Mouse
Entrez	125488	72747
Ensembl	ENSG00000168234	ENSMUSG00000024424
UniProt	Q8N584	Q8VE09
RefSeq (mRNA)	NM_001135993; NM_001243425; NM_001292030; NM_153211	NM_028341
RefSeq (protein)	NP_001129465; NP_001230354; NP_001278959; NP_694943	NP_082617
Location (UCSC)	Chr 18: 23.99 – 24.14 Mb	Chr 18: 12.73 – 12.87 Mb
PubMed search
- Wikidata
View/Edit Human	View/Edit Mouse

Tetratricopeptide repeat protein 39C is a protein that in humans is encoded by the TTC39C gene. TTC39C is one of three TTC39. Its function is currently unknown; however, there is some evidence suggesting that it plays a role in anaphase. It also contains a relatively well-characterized structural motif called the tetratricopeptide repeat (TPR).

== Gene ==
TTC39C is located on the long arm of human chromosome 18 at 18q11.2. Its most common aliases are FLJ33761, C18orf17, and HsT2697.

== Protein ==
The TTC39C protein is 583 amino acids long, and appears to be localized to the cytoplasm of the cell based on its predicted secondary structure It has three isoforms, the longest of which is transcript variant 1. It contains three tetratricopeptide repeats, as well as the domain of unknown function DUF3808. The protein product has a molecular weight of 65.9 kDa and an isoelectric point of 6.584. There are several predicted phosphorylation, acetylation, and palmitoylation sites, which are shown in the table below. Its whole predicted secondary structure is composed almost entirely of helices, and forms a tertiary structure that is predicted to match the structure of the cut9 protein in yeast with 100% accuracy and 85% coverage.

Type	Location	Function	Quality of Sites
Phosphorylation	Threonine; 1, 4, and 9; Serine; 8, 9, 29, 31, 32, 35, and 39; Tyrosine; 5, 10, and 18	Regulation of cell cycle, apoptosis, cell signaling, etc.	High
Acetylation	Possible acetylation site immediately downstream of the N-terminal methionine	Regulates gene expression	Moderate
Palmitoylation	Cysteines 87 and 497	Anchors Protein to membrane	Moderate

== Homology ==
The TTC39C protein is over 50% conserved in most vertebrates, and has conservation levels as low as about 24% in invertebrates. At least one ortholog and several homologs have also been identified in fungi. No orthologs have been identified in plants. Several of its orthologs are shown in the table below.

Scientific name	Common name	Mean Predicted Date of Divergence (MYA)	Protein Length (aa)	RNA NCBI Accession Number	Protein NCBI Accession Number	RNA Identity	Protein Identity
Callithrix jacchus	Marmoset	42.6	522	XM_002807499	XP_002807545	42.2%	99.4%
Anolis carolinensis	Anole	296.0	574	XM_003219667	XP_003219715	27.7%	81.7%
Gallus gallus	Chicken	296.0	576	XM_419163	XP_419163	36.1%	88.0%
Xenopus tropicalis	Western Clawed Frog	371.2	570	NM_001113821	NP_001107293	55.20%	88.0%
Oreochromis niloticus	Tilapia	400.1	578	XM_003444269	XP_003444317	24.0%	70.2%
Apis mellifera	Honeybee	782.7	877	XM_001120231	XP_001120231	38.7%	24.3%
Saccharomyces cerevisiae	Baker's Yeast	1215.8	725	NM_001179808	NP_012943	29.7%	17.6%

TTC39C has two paralogs from the TTC39 family: TTC39A, and TTC39B, which are located on chromosome 1, at 1p32.3 and chromosome 9, at 9p22.3 respectively. TTC39B has been associated with the management of HDL cholesterol, and may be involved in the prevention of cardiovascular disease

== Expression ==
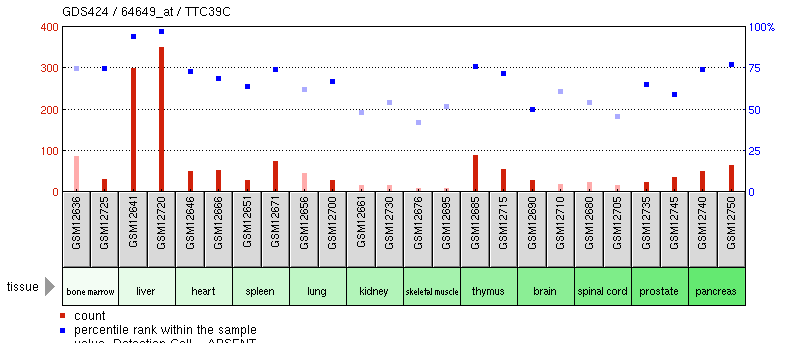
Expression in Various Tissues

The promoter region controlling expression of transcript variant 1 begins approximately 952 bases upstream of the start codon, and includes the entire 5' UTR. Several possible transcription factor binding sites have been identified using the program El Dorado including the CCCTC binding factor and a site for CTCF, an insulator protein that binds CCCTC. This transcription factor is associated with a number of functions including organization of chromatin. There were also several sites that appear to be the general transcription factor TFIIB, and both E2F and E2F transcription factor binding sites. The E2F transcription factors are involved in mediating the cell cycle, which could be a potential link to the hypothesized role of TTC39C in anaphase. Several microarray studies of humans, dogs and mice have provided evidence that TTC39C is most highly expressed in the liver. It exhibits relatively high expression in all tissues, and had a percentile rank above 50% in all tissues except in kidney, spinal cord, and skeletal muscle samples of humans.

== Function ==
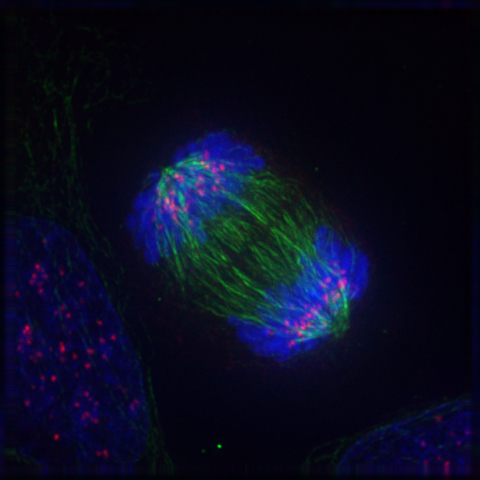
Anaphase IF

The function of TTC39C is currently unknown. However, one of its structural motifs, the tetratricopeptide repeat is relatively well characterized, and has been shown to be active primarily in four categories of protein-protein interactions: interacting with molecular chaperones, mediating the start of anaphase during cell division, transcription repression, and the transport of proteins. Of these four areas of functionality, the most evidence exists for its involvement in the initiation of anaphase. Two of the three possible interacting proteins identified by STRING play a role in anaphase. Finally, the protein that had a structure that appears to perfectly match 85% of the TTC39C sequence is involved in anaphase in the yeast, Schizosaccharomyces pombe. However, the role of TTC39C in anaphase must be confirmed through additional studies.

== Interactions ==
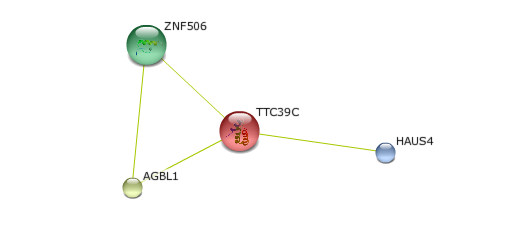
TTC39C Interaction Network

Textmining studies have identified several proteins that TTC39C may interact with. These protein-protein interactions have not been confirmed; however, two of the identified proteins, AGBL1 and HAUS4, are likely candidates due to their roles in anaphase. Additional potential protein-protein interactions were identified for TTC39C in mice; however, there is no apparent connection to TTC39C besides coexpression.
