= HGS (gene) =

Protein-coding gene in the species Homo sapiens

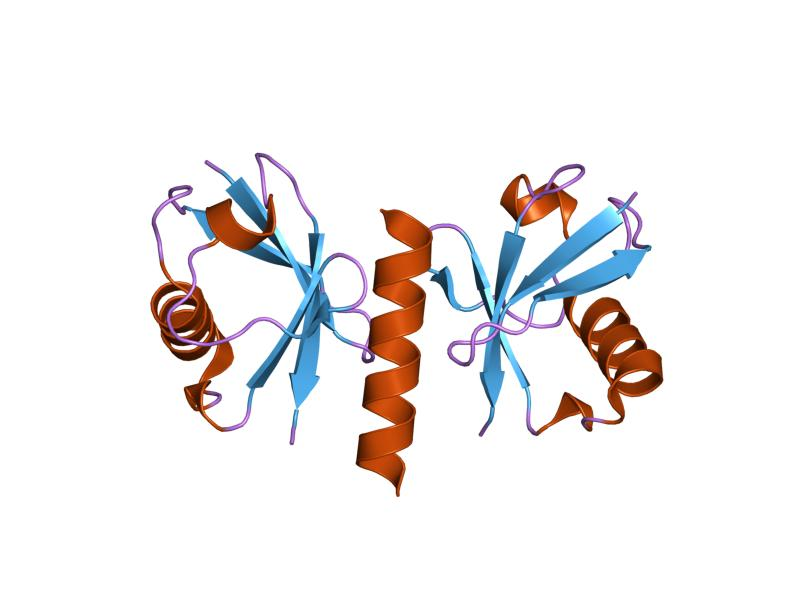

Identifiers
- Aliases: HGS, HRS, hepatocyte growth factor-regulated tyrosine kinase substrate
- External IDs: OMIM: 604375; MGI: 104681; GeneCards: HGS
Available structures
PDB	Ortholog search: PDBe RCSB
PDB	List of PDB id codes 2D3G, 3F1I, 3OBQ, 3ZYQ, 4AVX

Gene location (Human)
Chr.	Chromosome 17 (human)
Band	17q25.3	Start	81,683,326 bp
Band	17q25.3	End	81,703,138 bp

Gene location (Mouse)
Chr.	Chromosome 11 (mouse)
Band	11 E2|11 84.16 cM	Start	120,358,461 bp
Band	11 E2|11 84.16 cM	End	120,374,805 bp
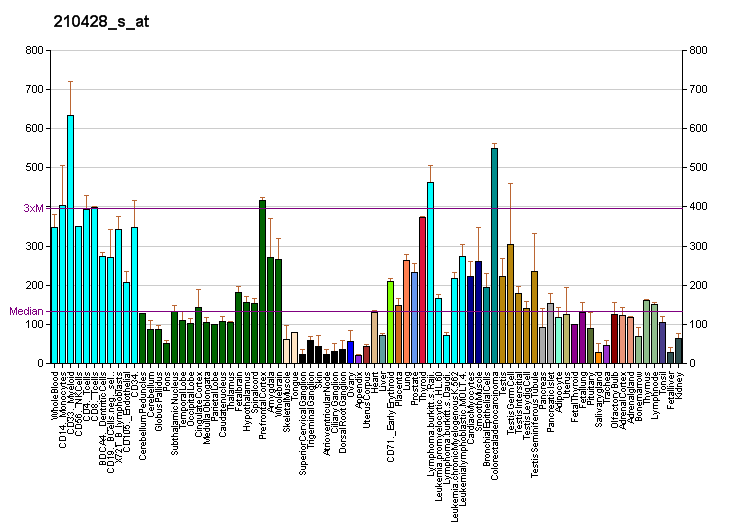
RNA expression pattern
Bgee	Human / Mouse (ortholog); Top expressed in: right uterine tube; sural nerve; granulocyte; right testis; left testis; right hemisphere of cerebellum; anterior pituitary; canal of the cervix; skin of abdomen; mucosa of transverse colon / Top expressed in: Ileal epithelium; entorhinal cortex; perirhinal cortex; lactiferous gland; choroid plexus of fourth ventricle; CA3 field; seminiferous tubule; spermatid; granulocyte; spermatocyte; More reference expression data
BioGPS	More reference expression data
Gene ontology
Molecular function	protein domain specific binding; metal ion binding; protein binding; ubiquitin-like protein ligase binding
Cellular component	endosome; early endosome membrane; multivesicular body membrane; intracellular membrane-bounded organelle; membrane; early endosome; extracellular exosome; cytoplasm; lysosome; cytosol; ESCRT-0 complex
Biological process	protein localization to membrane; protein targeting to lysosome; negative regulation of epidermal growth factor receptor signaling pathway; membrane invagination; multivesicular body assembly; endosomal transport; positive regulation of gene expression; regulation of protein catabolic process; protein transport; regulation of MAP kinase activity; positive regulation of exosomal secretion; intracellular protein transport; signal transduction; negative regulation of cell population proliferation; negative regulation of receptor signaling pathway via JAK-STAT; macroautophagy; protein deubiquitination; membrane organization; transport; negative regulation of platelet-derived growth factor receptor signaling pathway; negative regulation of angiogenesis; negative regulation of vascular endothelial growth factor receptor signaling pathway
Sources:Amigo / QuickGO
Orthologs
Databases	NCBI: entry; OMA: entry
Species	Human	Mouse
Entrez	9146	15239
Ensembl	ENSG00000185359	ENSMUSG00000025793
UniProt	O14964	Q99LI8
RefSeq (mRNA)	NM_004712	NM_001159328; NM_008244
RefSeq (protein)	NP_004703	NP_001152800; NP_032270
Location (UCSC)	Chr 17: 81.68 – 81.7 Mb	Chr 11: 120.36 – 120.37 Mb
PubMed search
- Wikidata
View/Edit Human	View/Edit Mouse

Hepatocyte growth factor-regulated tyrosine kinase substrate is an enzyme that in humans is encoded by the HGS gene.

== Interactions ==
HGS has been shown to interact with:

- CLTC
- DLG4,
- EPS15,
- IL2RB,
- Merlin,
- STAM2,
- Signal transducing adaptor molecule
- TSG101.
