= RNF11 =

Protein-coding gene in humans

Identifiers
- Aliases: RNF11, SID1669, CGI-123, ring finger protein 11
- External IDs: OMIM: 612598; MGI: 1352759; GeneCards: RNF11

Gene location (Human)
Chr.	Chromosome 1 (human)
Band	1p32.3	Start	51,236,273 bp
Band	1p32.3	End	51,273,447 bp

Gene location (Mouse)
Chr.	Chromosome 4 (mouse)
Band	4|4 C7	Start	109,308,295 bp
Band	4|4 C7	End	109,341,925 bp
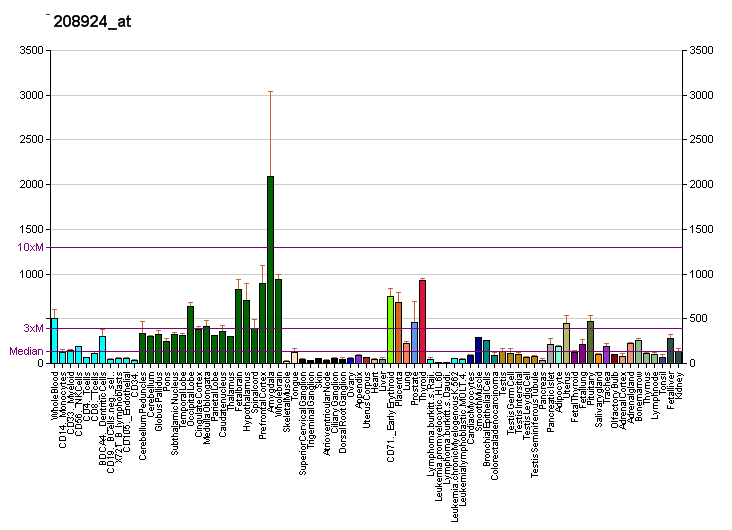
RNA expression pattern
Bgee	Human / Mouse (ortholog); Top expressed in: lateral nuclear group of thalamus; endothelial cell; prefrontal cortex; pars compacta; external globus pallidus; pars reticulata; dorsolateral prefrontal cortex; superior vestibular nucleus; monocyte; Brodmann area 9 / Top expressed in: blood; lateral septal nucleus; tibiofemoral joint; cardiac muscle tissue of left ventricle; ventromedial nucleus; cingulate gyrus; CA3 field; perirhinal cortex; subcutaneous adipose tissue; central gray substance of midbrain; More reference expression data
BioGPS	More reference expression data
Gene ontology
Molecular function	DNA binding; protein binding; metal ion binding; ubiquitin-protein transferase activity; ubiquitin protein ligase activity; zinc ion binding
Cellular component	ubiquitin ligase complex; cytoplasm; recycling endosome; endosome; early endosome; extracellular exosome; nucleus
Biological process	ubiquitin-dependent protein catabolic process; protein autoubiquitination; proteasome-mediated ubiquitin-dependent protein catabolic process
Sources:Amigo / QuickGO
Orthologs
Databases	NCBI: entry; OMA: entry
Species	Human	Mouse
Entrez	26994	29864
Ensembl	ENSG00000123091	ENSMUSG00000028557
UniProt	Q9Y3C5	Q9QYK7
RefSeq (mRNA)	NM_014372	NM_013876
RefSeq (protein)	NP_055187	NP_038904
Location (UCSC)	Chr 1: 51.24 – 51.27 Mb	Chr 4: 109.31 – 109.34 Mb
PubMed search
- Wikidata
View/Edit Human	View/Edit Mouse

RING finger protein 11 is a protein that in humans is encoded by the RNF11 gene.

== Function ==
The protein encoded by this gene contains a RING-H2 finger motif, which is known to be important for protein-protein interactions. The expression of this gene has been shown to be induced by mutant RET proteins (MEN2A/MEN2B). The germline mutations in RET gene are known to be responsible for the development of multiple endocrine neoplasia (MEN).

== See also ==
- RING finger domain

== Interactions ==
RNF11 has been shown to interact with RIPK1 and STAMBP.
