= Signal transducing adaptor molecule =

Protein-coding gene in the species Homo sapiens

STAM
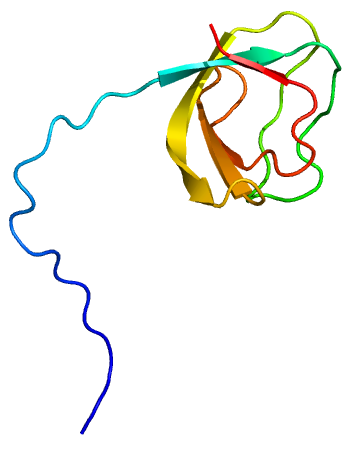

Identifiers
- Aliases: STAM, STAM-1, STAM1, Signal transducing adaptor molecule
- External IDs: OMIM: 601899; MGI: 1329014; GeneCards: STAM
Available structures
PDB	Ortholog search: PDBe RCSB
PDB	List of PDB id codes 2L0A, 3F1I, 3LDZ

Gene location (Human)
Chr.	Chromosome 10 (human)
Band	10p12.33	Start	17,644,151 bp
Band	10p12.33	End	17,716,824 bp

Gene location (Mouse)
Chr.	Chromosome 2 (mouse)
Band	2|2 A2	Start	14,078,909 bp
Band	2|2 A2	End	14,154,445 bp
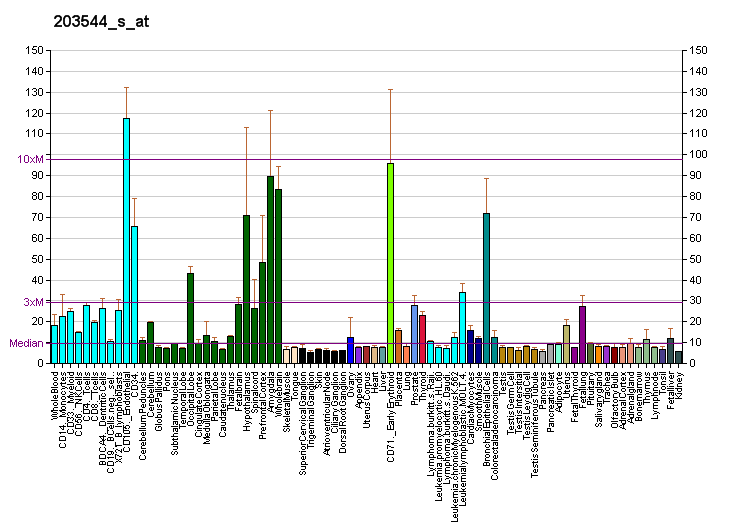
RNA expression pattern
Bgee	Human / Mouse (ortholog); Top expressed in: Achilles tendon; amniotic fluid; endothelial cell; retinal pigment epithelium; corpus callosum; Brodmann area 23; pars compacta; germinal epithelium; pons; ganglionic eminence / Top expressed in: tail of embryo; genital tubercle; ganglionic eminence; perirhinal cortex; entorhinal cortex; CA3 field; superior frontal gyrus; medial ganglionic eminence; ventricular zone; dentate gyrus of hippocampal formation granule cell; More reference expression data
BioGPS	More reference expression data
Gene ontology
Molecular function	protein binding; ubiquitin-like protein ligase binding
Cellular component	cytoplasm; cytosol; endosome; early endosome membrane; membrane; ESCRT-0 complex
Biological process	negative regulation of epidermal growth factor receptor signaling pathway; regulation of extracellular exosome assembly; multivesicular body assembly; endosomal transport; protein transport; positive regulation of exosomal secretion; intracellular protein transport; signal transduction; positive regulation of signal transduction; macroautophagy; protein deubiquitination; membrane organization
Sources:Amigo / QuickGO
Orthologs
Databases	NCBI: entry; OMA: entry
Species	Human	Mouse
Entrez	8027	20844
Ensembl	ENSG00000136738	ENSMUSG00000026718
UniProt	Q92783	P70297
RefSeq (mRNA)	NM_003473; NM_001324282; NM_001324283; NM_001324284; NM_001324285 NM_001324286; NM_001324287; NM_001324288; NM_001324289	NM_011484; NM_001356337
RefSeq (protein)	NP_001311211; NP_001311212; NP_001311213; NP_001311214; NP_001311215 NP_001311216; NP_001311217; NP_001311218; NP_003464	NP_035614; NP_001343266
Location (UCSC)	Chr 10: 17.64 – 17.72 Mb	Chr 2: 14.08 – 14.15 Mb
PubMed search
- Wikidata
View/Edit Human	View/Edit Mouse

Signal transducing adapter molecule 1 is a protein that in humans is encoded by the STAM gene.

== Function ==
This gene was identified by the rapid tyrosine-phosphorylation of its product in response to cytokine stimulation. The encoded protein contains an SH3 domain and the immunoreceptor tyrosine-based activation motif (ITAM). This protein associates with JAK3 and JAK2 kinases via its ITAM region, and is phosphorylated by the JAK kinases upon cytokine stimulation, which suggests the function of this protein is as an adaptor molecule involved in the downstream signaling of cytokine receptors. HGS/HRS (hepatocyte growth factor-regulated tyrosine kinase substrate) has been found to bind and counteract the function of this protein. STAM1 contains multiple amino acid sites that are phosphorylated and ubiquitinated.

== Interactions ==
Signal transducing adaptor molecule has been shown to interact with

- HGS,
- Janus kinase 2.
- MAP3K1,
- STAMBP, and
- TIMM8A.
