= EPS15 =

Protein-coding gene in humans

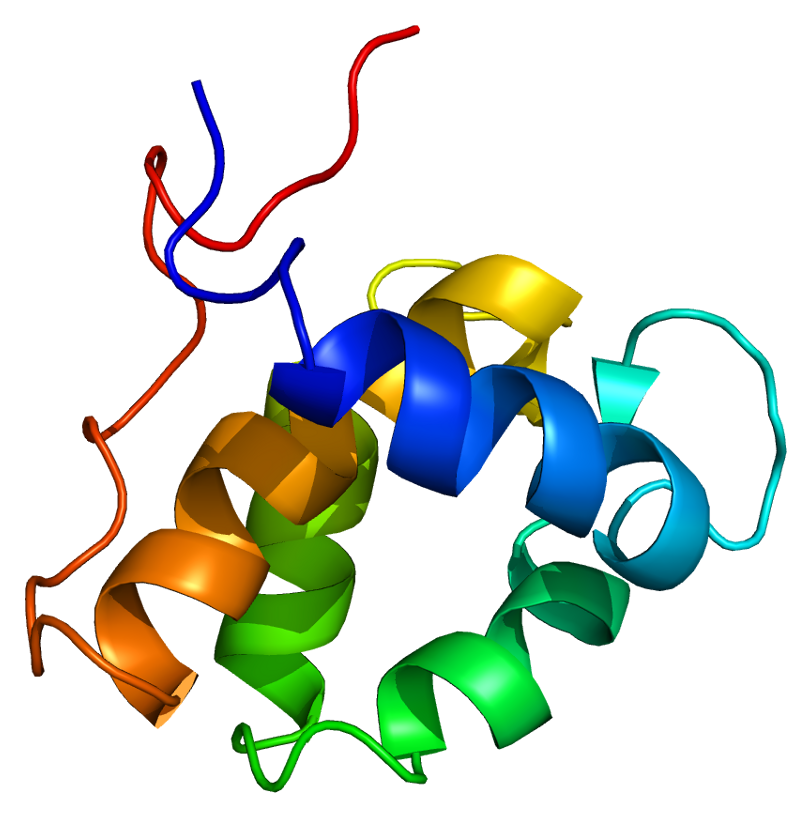

Identifiers
- Aliases: EPS15, AF-1P, AF1P, MLLT5, epidermal growth factor receptor pathway substrate 15
- External IDs: OMIM: 600051; MGI: 104583; GeneCards: EPS15
Available structures
PDB	Ortholog search: PDBe RCSB
PDB	List of PDB id codes 1C07, 1EH2, 1F8H, 1FF1, 2IV9, 2JXC, 4RH5, 4RH9, 4RHG, 4S0G, 5JP2

Gene location (Human)
Chr.	Chromosome 1 (human)
Band	1p32.3	Start	51,354,263 bp
Band	1p32.3	End	51,519,266 bp

Gene location (Mouse)
Chr.	Chromosome 4 (mouse)
Band	4|4 C7	Start	109,137,465 bp
Band	4|4 C7	End	109,245,014 bp
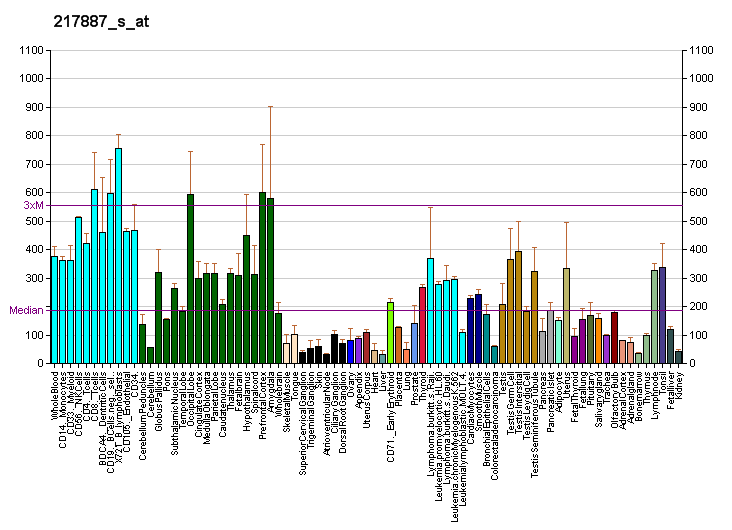

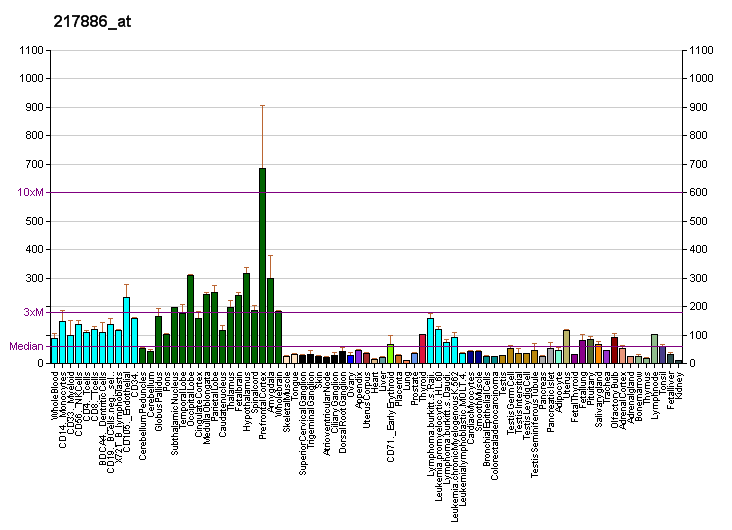
RNA expression pattern
Bgee	Human / Mouse (ortholog); Top expressed in: endothelial cell; sperm; internal globus pallidus; frontal pole; Brodmann area 23; middle temporal gyrus; pars compacta; lateral nuclear group of thalamus; corpus callosum; pons / Top expressed in: Region I of hippocampus proper; substantia nigra; cingulate gyrus; sciatic nerve; ventral tegmental area; deep cerebellar nuclei; lateral geniculate nucleus; cerebellar vermis; pontine nuclei; lobe of cerebellum; More reference expression data
BioGPS	More reference expression data
Gene ontology
Molecular function	calcium ion binding; SH3 domain binding; metal ion binding; polyubiquitin modification-dependent protein binding; protein binding; cadherin binding; identical protein binding; cargo receptor activity
Cellular component	endosome; clathrin coat of coated pit; early endosome membrane; membrane; intracellular membrane-bounded organelle; plasma membrane; aggresome; ciliary membrane; clathrin-coated pit; AP-2 adaptor complex; clathrin-coated vesicle; basal plasma membrane; apical plasma membrane; early endosome; cytoplasm; cytosol; synapse; postsynapse; glutamatergic synapse
Biological process	negative regulation of epidermal growth factor receptor signaling pathway; endocytosis; epidermal growth factor receptor signaling pathway; vesicle organization; Golgi to endosome transport; clathrin coat assembly; protein transport; viral entry into host cell; receptor-mediated endocytosis of virus by host cell; cell population proliferation; positive regulation of receptor recycling; regulation of cell population proliferation; endocytic recycling; membrane organization; viral process; transport; postsynaptic neurotransmitter receptor internalization
Sources:Amigo / QuickGO
Orthologs
Databases	NCBI: entry; OMA: entry
Species	Human	Mouse
Entrez	2060	13858
Ensembl	ENSG00000085832	ENSMUSG00000028552
UniProt	P42566	P42567
RefSeq (mRNA)	NM_001159969; NM_001981	NM_001159964; NM_007943
RefSeq (protein)	NP_001153441; NP_001972	NP_001153436; NP_031969
Location (UCSC)	Chr 1: 51.35 – 51.52 Mb	Chr 4: 109.14 – 109.25 Mb
PubMed search
- Wikidata
View/Edit Human	View/Edit Mouse

Epidermal growth factor receptor substrate 15 is a protein that in humans is encoded by the EPS15 gene.

== Function ==
This gene encodes a protein that is part of the EGFR pathway. The protein is present at clathrin-coated pits and is involved in receptor-mediated endocytosis of EGF. Notably, this gene is rearranged with the HRX/ALL/MLL gene in acute myelogeneous leukemias. Alternate transcriptional splice variants of this gene have been observed but have not been thoroughly characterized.

== Interactions ==
EPS15 has been shown to interact with:

- CRK
- EPN1,
- HGS,
- HRB, and
- REPS2.
