= CLTC =

Protein-coding gene in humans

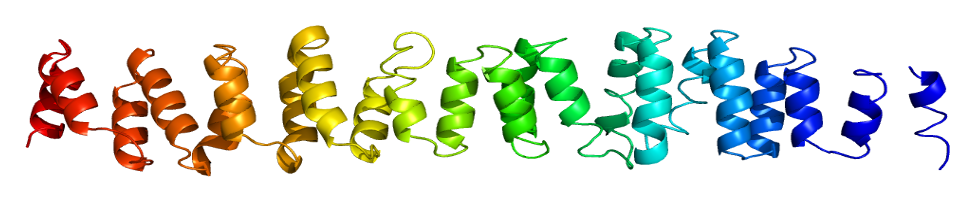

Identifiers
- Aliases: CLTC, CHC, CHC17, CLH-17, CLTCL2, Hc, clathrin heavy chain, MRD56
- External IDs: OMIM: 118955; MGI: 2388633; GeneCards: CLTC
Available structures
PDB	Ortholog search: PDBe RCSB
PDB	List of PDB id codes 2XZG, 4G55

Gene location (Human)
Chr.	Chromosome 17 (human)
Band	17q23.1	Start	59,619,689 bp
Band	17q23.1	End	59,696,956 bp

Gene location (Mouse)
Chr.	Chromosome 11 (mouse)
Band	11|11 C	Start	86,585,177 bp
Band	11|11 C	End	86,648,391 bp
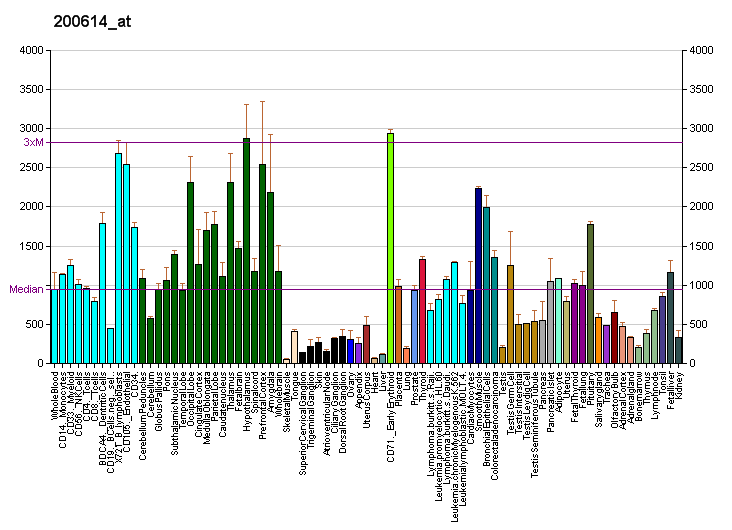
RNA expression pattern
Bgee	Human / Mouse (ortholog); Top expressed in: pons; lateral nuclear group of thalamus; Brodmann area 46; middle temporal gyrus; mucosa of sigmoid colon; orbitofrontal cortex; postcentral gyrus; corpus epididymis; trabecular bone; pars compacta / Top expressed in: stroma of bone marrow; habenula; pontine nuclei; medial geniculate nucleus; medial dorsal nucleus; medial vestibular nucleus; dorsomedial hypothalamic nucleus; lateral geniculate nucleus; deep cerebellar nuclei; ventral tegmental area; More reference expression data
BioGPS	More reference expression data
Gene ontology
Molecular function	protein binding; double-stranded RNA binding; protein kinase binding; structural molecule activity; RNA binding; clathrin light chain binding; disordered domain specific binding; low-density lipoprotein particle receptor binding; ubiquitin-specific protease binding
Cellular component	extracellular vesicle; cytosol; clathrin-coated endocytic vesicle membrane; clathrin coat of coated pit; trans-Golgi network membrane; clathrin coat of trans-Golgi network vesicle; focal adhesion; melanosome; plasma membrane; endolysosome membrane; clathrin-coated pit; extracellular exosome; cytoplasmic vesicle membrane; cytoplasmic vesicle; clathrin-coated vesicle; extracellular matrix; membrane; mitotic spindle microtubule; cytoplasm; lysosome; endosome; spindle; cytoskeleton; clathrin coat; clathrin complex; protein-containing complex; intracellular membrane-bounded organelle; clathrin-coated endocytic vesicle; mitotic spindle; intracellular anatomical structure
Biological process	antigen processing and presentation of exogenous peptide antigen via MHC class II; transferrin transport; receptor internalization; negative regulation of protein localization to plasma membrane; retrograde transport, endosome to Golgi; osteoblast differentiation; vesicle-mediated transport; negative regulation of hyaluronan biosynthetic process; intracellular protein transport; Wnt signaling pathway, planar cell polarity pathway; regulation of mitotic spindle organization; autophagy; microtubule-based movement; cell cycle; cell division; membrane organization; mitotic cell cycle; receptor-mediated endocytosis; low-density lipoprotein particle receptor catabolic process; low-density lipoprotein particle clearance; clathrin coat assembly; clathrin-dependent endocytosis; amyloid-beta clearance by transcytosis
Sources:Amigo / QuickGO
Orthologs
Databases	NCBI: entry; OMA: entry
Species	Human	Mouse
Entrez	1213	67300
Ensembl	ENSG00000141367	ENSMUSG00000047126
UniProt	Q00610	Q68FD5
RefSeq (mRNA)	NM_001288653; NM_004859	NM_001003908; NM_001356393
RefSeq (protein)	NP_001275582; NP_004850	NP_001003908; NP_001343322
Location (UCSC)	Chr 17: 59.62 – 59.7 Mb	Chr 11: 86.59 – 86.65 Mb
PubMed search
- Wikidata
View/Edit Human	View/Edit Mouse

Clathrin heavy chain 1 is a protein that in humans is encoded by the CLTC gene.

Clathrin is a major protein component of the cytoplasmic face of intracellular organelles, called coated vesicles and coated pits. These specialized organelles are involved in the intracellular trafficking of receptors and endocytosis of a variety of macromolecules. The basic subunit of the clathrin coat is composed of three heavy chains and three light chains.

== Interactions ==
CLTC has been shown to interact with PICALM and HGS.

== See also ==
- Clathrin
