= STAMBP =

Protein-coding gene in the species Homo sapiens

Available structures
PDB	Ortholog search: PDBe RCSB
PDB	List of PDB id codes 2XZE, 3RZU, 3RZV

Identifiers
- Aliases: STAMBP, AMSH, MICCAP, STAM binding protein
- External IDs: OMIM: 606247; MGI: 1917777; HomoloGene: 4719; GeneCards: STAMBP; OMA:STAMBP - orthologs

Gene location (Mouse)
Chr.	Chromosome 6 (mouse)
Band	6|6 C3	Start	83,520,193 bp
Band	6|6 C3	End	83,549,711 bp
Gene ontology
Molecular function	protein domain specific binding; metal ion binding; peptidase activity; protein binding; thiol-dependent deubiquitinase; hydrolase activity; metallopeptidase activity; Lys63-specific deubiquitinase activity
Cellular component	endosome; membrane; plasma membrane; nucleoplasm; early endosome; cleavage furrow; extracellular exosome; nucleus; cytoplasm; cytosol
Biological process	negative regulation of neuron apoptotic process; receptor signaling pathway via JAK-STAT; mitotic cytokinesis; proteolysis; negative regulation of Ras protein signal transduction; negative regulation of phosphatidylinositol 3-kinase signaling; positive regulation of cell population proliferation; protein deubiquitination; protein K63-linked deubiquitination
Sources:Amigo / QuickGO
Orthologs
Species	Human	Mouse
Entrez	10617	70527
Ensembl	ENSG00000124356	ENSMUSG00000006906
UniProt	O95630	Q9CQ26
RefSeq (mRNA)	NM_006463; NM_201647; NM_213622	NM_024239; NM_001362078; NM_001362079; NM_001362080
RefSeq (protein)	NP_006454; NP_964010; NP_998787; NP_001340896; NP_001340897 NP_001340898; NP_001340899; NP_001340900; NP_001340901; NP_001340902; NP_001340903; NP_001340904; NP_001340905	NP_077201; NP_001349007; NP_001349008; NP_001349009
Location (UCSC)	n/a	Chr 6: 83.52 – 83.55 Mb
PubMed search
- Wikidata
View/Edit Human	View/Edit Mouse

STAM-binding protein is a protein that in humans is encoded by the STAMBP gene.

== Function ==
Cytokine-mediated signal transduction in the JAK-STAT cascade requires the involvement of adaptor molecules. One such signal-transducing adaptor molecule contains an SH3 domain that is required for induction of MYC and cell growth. The protein encoded by this gene binds to the SH3 domain of the signal-transducing adaptor molecule, and plays a critical role in cytokine-mediated signaling for MYC induction and cell cycle progression. Multiple alternatively spliced transcript variants encoding the same protein isoform have been found for this gene.

== Clinical significance ==
Mutations in this gene have been associated with a unique congenital progressive encephalopathy known as MIC-CAP.

== Interactions ==
STAMBP has been shown to interact with RNF11, Signal transducing adaptor molecule and GRAP2.
