= List of adaptins =

Clathrin adaptor proteins, also known as adaptins, are proteins that mediate the formation of vesicles for intracellular trafficking and secretion. Adaptins are clustered subunits of adaptor protein (AP) complexes. There are several types of adaptin, each related to a different AP complex.

Adaptins show sequence similarity to some COPI subunits, thus they are thought to have a common evolutionary origin. The adaptin is a heterotetramer consisting of two large adaptins (beta and one other depending on the complex), a medium adaptin (mu), and a small adaptin (sigma):

- complex 1
  - AP1B1
  - AP1G1
  - AP1G2
  - AP1M1
  - AP1M2
  - AP1S1
  - AP1S2
  - AP1S3
- complex 2
  - AP2A1
  - AP2A2
  - AP2B1
  - AP2M1
  - AP2S1
- complex 3
  - AP3B1
  - AP3B2
  - AP3D1
  - AP3M1
  - AP3M2
  - AP3S1
  - AP3S2
- complex 4
  - AP4B1
  - AP4E1
  - AP4M1
  - AP4S1
- complex 5
  - AP5Z1
  - AP5B1
  - AP5M1
  - AP5S1

A diagram of the 5 complexes is shown here
