= PTPRU =

Protein-coding gene in humans

Identifiers
- Aliases: PTPRU, FMI, PCP-2, PTP, PTP-J, PTP-PI, PTP-RO, PTPPSI, PTPRO, PTPU2, R-PTP-PSI, R-PTP-U, hPTP-J, protein tyrosine phosphatase, receptor type U, protein tyrosine phosphatase receptor type U
- External IDs: OMIM: 602454; MGI: 1321151; GeneCards: PTPRU
Enzyme activity
EC #	BRENDA	ExPASy	KEGG	MetaCyc
3.1.3.48	↗	↗	↗	↗

Gene location (Human)
Chr.	Chromosome 1 (human)
Band	1p35.3	Start	29,236,516 bp
Band	1p35.3	End	29,326,813 bp

Gene location (Mouse)
Chr.	Chromosome 4 (mouse)
Band	4 D2.3|4 64.5 cM	Start	131,768,457 bp
Band	4 D2.3|4 64.5 cM	End	131,838,288 bp
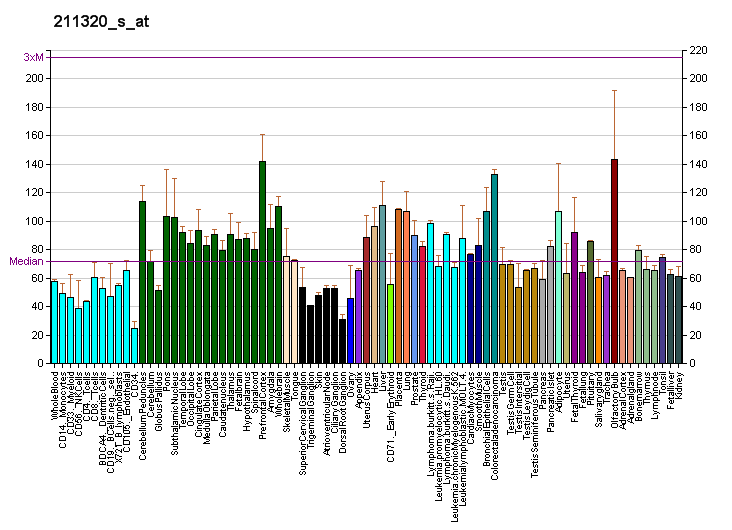
RNA expression pattern
Bgee	Human / Mouse (ortholog); Top expressed in: canal of the cervix; olfactory zone of nasal mucosa; ectocervix; tibial nerve; sural nerve; nasal epithelium; right uterine tube; trigeminal ganglion; pars reticulata; pars compacta / Top expressed in: ventricular zone; lens; neural layer of retina; primary visual cortex; molar; superior frontal gyrus; Region II of hippocampus proper; gastrula; cerebellar cortex; saccule; More reference expression data
BioGPS	More reference expression data
Gene ontology
Molecular function	beta-catenin binding; phosphoprotein phosphatase activity; phosphatase activity; protein binding; transmembrane receptor protein tyrosine phosphatase activity; hydrolase activity; protein tyrosine phosphatase activity; identical protein binding
Cellular component	integral component of membrane; membrane; cell-cell junction; integral component of plasma membrane; cell junction; plasma membrane
Biological process	cell differentiation; response to glucocorticoid; homotypic cell-cell adhesion; transmembrane receptor protein tyrosine phosphatase signaling pathway; negative regulation of cell migration; protein localization to cell surface; animal organ regeneration; canonical Wnt signaling pathway; negative regulation of cell population proliferation; dephosphorylation; cell adhesion; peptidyl-tyrosine dephosphorylation; protein dephosphorylation; cell-cell adhesion; negative regulation of canonical Wnt signaling pathway; positive regulation of cell-cell adhesion mediated by cadherin
Sources:Amigo / QuickGO
Orthologs
Databases	NCBI: entry; OMA: entry
Species	Human	Mouse
Entrez	10076	19273
Ensembl	ENSG00000060656	ENSMUSG00000028909
UniProt	Q92729	B1AUH1
RefSeq (mRNA)	NM_001195001; NM_005704; NM_133177; NM_133178	NM_001083119; NM_011214
RefSeq (protein)	NP_001181930; NP_005695; NP_573438; NP_573439	NP_001076588; NP_035344
Location (UCSC)	Chr 1: 29.24 – 29.33 Mb	Chr 4: 131.77 – 131.84 Mb
PubMed search
- Wikidata
View/Edit Human	View/Edit Mouse

Receptor-type tyrosine-protein phosphatase PCP-2 (also known as PTP-pi, PTP lambda, hPTP-J, PTPRO and PTP psi), is an enzyme that in humans is encoded by the PTPRU gene.

== Function ==
The protein encoded by this gene is a member of the protein tyrosine phosphatase (PTP) family. PTPs are known to be signaling molecules that regulate a variety of cellular processes including cell growth, differentiation, mitotic cycle, and oncogenic transformation. This PTP possesses an extracellular region, a single transmembrane region, and two tandem intracellular catalytic tyrosine phosphatase domains, and thus represents a receptor-type PTP (RPTP). The extracellular region contains a meprin-A5 antigen-PTPmu (MAM) domain, one Ig-like domain and four fibronectin type III-like repeats, and thus is a member of the type R2B RPTP family. It was cloned by many groups and given different names, including PCP-2, PTP pi, PTP lambda, hPTP-J, PTPRO, and PTP psi. Other type R2B RPTPs include PTPRM, PTPRK, and PTPRT. Analysis of the genomic structure of PCP-2 suggests that it is the most distantly related of the type R2B RPTPS.

RPTPs are able to remove phosphate moieties from tyrosine residues. Although the R2B family of RPTPs are characterized as having two tyrosine phosphatase domains in their intracellular domain, usually only one is catalytically active. A point mutation study suggests that only the first phosphatase domain of PCP-2 is catalytically active and able to dephosphorylate β-catenin. A recombinant protein with both PCP-2 phosphatase domains was also able to dephosphorylate EGFR. However, when each of the two intracellular catalytic tyrosine phosphatase domains are expressed individually as recombinant proteins and assayed in vitro using the artificial substrate ρ-nitrophenol phosphate (pNPP), both the first and second intracellular tyrosine phosphatase domain were able to dephosphorylate pNPP.

== PTPRU as a pseudophosphatase ==
The X-ray crystallographic structure of the first PTPRU phopshatase (D1) domain shows that several divergent sequences in key catalytic motifs result in structural rearrangements that render this domain catalytically inactive. Phosphatase activity for the PTPRU D1 phosphatase domain is undetectable against a range of phosphorylated substrates, and the full PTPRU intracellular domain cannot dephosphorylate pNPP, suggesting PTPRU completely lacks phosphatase activity. PTPRU can therefore be classified as a pseudoenzyme, in this case a pseudophosphatase. Despite a lack of catalytic activity, PTPRU is able to bind the substrates of the related RPTP, PTPRK. Removal of PTPRU from MCF10A breast epithelial cells leads to a reduction in phosphorylation of the cell adhesion protein p120-Catenin, suggesting PTPRU binding may act to sequester and protect proteins from dephosphorylation by active phosphatases.

== Regulation ==
PCP-2 mRNA is regulated by phorbol myristate acetate (PMA) or calcium ionophore, okadaic acid, the Ras inhibitor manumycin, and orthovanadate in Jurkat T lymphoma cells.

== Alternative splicing ==
Four alternatively spliced transcript variants, which encode distinct proteins, have been reported.

Examination of mouse full-length cDNA sequences for alternatively spliced phosphatase genes identified two novel forms of PTPRU predicted to result in two PCP-2 splice variants: a tethered variant of PCP-2, expressing an intact extracellular and transmembrane domain, and a PCP-2 variant that lacked a signal peptide, but encoded intact transmembrane and cytoplasmic domains.

== Homophilic binding ==
The MAM, Ig and first fibronectin III domain of PCP-2 was shown to mediate bead aggregation in vitro. PCP-2 accomplishes this by binding to another PCP-2 molecule on a fluorescent bead, known as homophilic binding. PCP-2 was unable to mediate aggregation between non-adherent cells when expressed as a full-length protein, however, suggesting that PCP-2 does not mediate homophilic adhesion in cells. The MAM and Ig domains of PCP-2 are capable of mediating weak cell-cell adhesion when swapped into the wild-type PTPrho protein, demonstrating that the MAM and Ig domain can mediate weak cell adhesion, but that they require other functional domains within PTPrho to mediate cell-cell adhesion. The Ig domain of the R2B RPTP, PTPmu, is sufficient to mediate bead aggregation in vitro, therefore, it is possible that the PCP-2 constructs used by Cheng and colleagues were able to mediate bead aggregation due to a functional Ig domain in PCP-2. A functional Ig domain itself would not be sufficient to mediate cell-cell adhesion, however. Similar to other subfamily members, PCP-2 does not mediate heterophilic binding between different R2B RPTPs.

== Regulation of cadherin-dependent adhesion ==
PCP-2 was localized to cell-cell contact sites using immunohistochemistry, and shown to co-localize with E-cadherin and catenins. PCP-2 was shown to be associated with B-catenin (β-catenin) in cellular lysates. and to directly bind to β-catenin likely via a sequence in the juxtamembrane domain of PCP-2. β-catenin has since been shown to be a substrate of PCP-2. PCP-2 phosphatase activity antagonizes β-catenin mediated transcription. A consequence of PCP-2 dephosphorylation of β-catenin is to promote E-cadherin mediated cell-cell adhesion, reduce cellular migration, and to reduce cell growth and transformation.

== Role in development ==
=== Tissue distribution ===
PCP-2 is expressed in the developing mouse nervous system. In specific, it is expressed in the roof plate and floor plate of the developing spinal cord between embryonic days (E) 10.5 and 13.5. At the same developmental time, it is expressed in the ventricular zone in the telencephalon and hindbrain. PCP-2 was also detected in the developing inner nuclear layer of the retina, in the olfactory epithelium of the nasal cavities, and in the meningeal coverings of the brain. In the developing chick nervous system, PCP-2 mRNA is expressed in the ventral midline of the neural tube and in the border between the midbrain and hindbrain, known as the mid-hindbrain boundary. PCP-2 mRNA is also observed in the ventricular zone of the developing chick neural retina.

PCP-2 is expressed in non-neural tissues during development, including the first forming somite in chick, known as S2, the lens fiber cells of the eye, in the esophagus, scleretome, kidneys, lungs, enamel organs (early incisor and molar teeth), and the cochlear ducts of the inner ear. PCP-2 expression in most of these tissue changes over the course of development.

PCP-2 is expressed in meso-diencephalic dopamine (mdDA) neurons. Its expression here is regulated by the coordinated activity of the orphan nuclear receptor Nurr1 binding to the PCP-2 promoter along with the homeobox transcription factor Pitx3. Both Nurr1 and Pitx3 are required for the development of mdDA neurons in the brain. This suggests that PCP-2 is also an important downstream gene for the development of mdDA neurons.

=== Function ===
Using morpholinos to reduce PCP-2 (PTP psi) protein expression in zebrafish embryos, Aerne and Ish-Horowicz demonstrated that PCP-2 was required for somite, or body segment, formation during zebrafish development. Reduction of PCP-2 expression resulted in the loss of boundaries between somites, shortening of the body axis, and disruption of anteroposterior polarity within developing somites. Ultimately, PCP-2 was shown to reduce the expression of the somitogenesis clock genes her1, her7 and delta C, suggesting to the authors that PCP-2 is involved either upstream or in parallel with the Notch-delta signaling pathway during zebrafish development.

PCP-2 is expressed in megakaryocytic cell lines. PCP-2 protein expression in these cell lines is increased by PMA stimulation. PCP-2 and the c-Kit tyrosine kinase receptor interact constitutively in these cells, and PCP-2 was shown to be tyrosine phosphorylated upon stimulation with the c-Kit ligand, SCF. Antisense oligonucleotide treatment of megakaryocyte cells to reduce PCP-2 protein expression resulted in a significant reduction in megakaryocyte progenitor proliferation.

== Role in cancer ==
PCP-2 is predicted to be a tumor suppressor gene because of its reduced expression in melanoma tissue and cell lines.

== Interactions ==
PCP-2 interacts with the following proteins:

- β-catenin
- Adaptor protein-3 (AP3; AP3B1, AP3B2, AP3D1, AP3M1, AP3S1, AP3S2)
- Sorting nexin 3 (SNX3)
- C-Kit receptor
