= Margaret Robinson =

Margaret Robinson FRS FMedSci
- Born: 29 December 1951 (age 74)
- Education: Smith College; Harvard University
- Known for: Adaptins
- Scientific career
- Fields: cell biology
- Workplaces: MRC Laboratory of Molecular Biology; University of Cambridge
- Thesis: Endocytosis in granulosa cells (1982)
- Doctoral advisor: Barbara Pearse
- Website: www.cimr.cam.ac.uk/staff/professor-margaret-robinson-frs

Margaret Scott Robinson (born 1951) is a British molecular cell biologist, a professor and researcher in the Cambridge Institute for Medical Research, at the University of Cambridge.

== Education ==
Robinson received her Bachelor of Arts degree in biology from Smith College in Massachusetts. She completed her PhD at Harvard University supervised by David Albertini and also Barbara Pearse. In 2003 she was appointed Professor of Molecular Cell Biology at the Cambridge Institute for Medical Research and is conducting research on coated vesicle proteins.

Margaret Robinson was first exposed about science early in her life from reading about Marie Curie. While enrolled at Smith College, she planned on being an English or theater major. However, due to university requirements, Margaret had to complete an introductory biology course. In that course, Jeanne Powell gave a lecture on cells and showed her students electron micrographs. This is when Margaret really became interested in cellular biology; the complexity of cells intrigued her.

After receiving her undergraduate degree, Robinson took a year off and ended up at Harvard Medical School.

Robinson eventually joined a new lab and was able to conduct research on anything she liked. Due to her inexperience, her research did not go as planned and was nearly kicked out of graduate school. Robinson had to stop working on her interest in coated vesicles and work on something closer to what the lab was researching.

Robinson eventually started a postdoctoral research with Barbara Pearse, joining her at the MRC Laboratory of Molecular Biology in December 1982. Her interest was in clathrin-coated vesicles that binds to cargo. She eventually succeeded in purifying components of the coat that were not clathrin and are now known as adaptor proteins. These proteins sit between clathrin, which forms the vesicle's outer shell and also the vesicle membrane. Continuing, Margaret discovered that there were two different populations of clathrin-coated vesicles, one that uses AP-2 at the plasma membrane and one that uses AP-1 and was associated with intracellular membranes. AP-1 and AP-2 are both heterotetramers with related subunits. They both have two large subunits and the other subunit is closely related in AP-1 and AP-2.

== Research ==
Her achievements include the discovery of adaptins, which are specific proteins that manage cell-trafficking to ensure the correct cell cargo is transported to the right location. She also discovered different combinations of adapting, when together with clathrin, form a coat around vesicles that bud from intracellular membranes and act as transporters for protein packages to be distributed in the cell. She also developed the technique "knock sideways," which inactivates proteins in seconds.

After finishing her postdoc, she was able to start her own lab. Her main focus was to learn more about the AP protein in depth. She had to also work with DNA because in order to characterize the complexes thoroughly, she needed to clone the subunits. Robinson and her lab managed to find another AP complex, AP-3, which interacts with lysosomal membrane proteins such as LAMP1. AP-3 also interacts with tyrosinase, which is a key enzyme in melanin biosynthesis, so AP-3 is important for tyrosinase trafficking to premelanosomes.

As of 2016 Robinson has a lab at Cambridge Institute for Medical Research. She specifically works with coated vesicles. The best-characterized coated vesicles are the clathrin-coated vesicles (CCVs). The coats on CCVs are primarily of clathrin, adaptor protein (AP) complexes, and alternative adaptors. Her working hypothesis is that for each trafficking pathway, there are a number of different adaptors, each of which is recruited independently onto the appropriate membrane. Once on the membrane, the various adaptors would work together to package different types of cargo into the newly forming vesicle. Robinson and her researchers use several approaches to look for novel adaptors and other components of the trafficking machinery, including proteomic analyses of sub cellular fractions, genome-wide siRNA library screening, insertional mutagenesis, and a new method they developed for rapidly inactivating proteins, called 'knock sideways'. Her current projects include establishing the functions of AP-1 and other adaptors in differentiated cells; matching up machinery and cargo proteins; investigating how clathrin and adaptors are hijacked by the HIV-1-encoded protein Nef; determine why mutations in the non-clathrin adaptors AP-4 and AP-5 cause hereditary spastic paraplegia; and exploring the evolution of adaptors. Her laboratory uses many techniques including immunolocalisation at the light and electron microscope levels, sub cellular fractionation, protein purification, proteomics, flow cytometry, live cell imaging, and X-ray crystallography.

=== Impact of research ===
Every form of eukaryotic life on earth contains coated vesicles and adaptors. Her work is also speculated to play a key role in evolution of eukaryotes form prokaryotes over two billion years ago. Her work also has medical implications. Some adaptors are mutated in certain genetic disorders, and adaptors are frequently exploited by pathogens . For example, the HIV genome encodes a protein called Nef, which is required for the development of AIDS, and which works by hijacking adaptors and using them to modify the surface of the infected cell.

Robinson's work explains how coated vesicles sort cargo but also provides tools that can be used by others to address their own favorite problems. For instance, her newly developed method called knocksideways. Knocksideways gets rid of proteins rapidly. Her technique has found its way into other labs who are also interested in how particular proteins contribute to different stages of cell division.

=== Selected publications ===
- Hirst, Jennifer; Schlacht, Alexander; Norcott, John P; Traynor, David; Bloomfield, Gareth; Antrobus, Robin; Kay, Robert R; Dacks, Joel B; Robinson, Margaret S (2014). "Characterization of TSET, an ancient and widespread membrane trafficking complex". eLife. 3 e02866. doi:10.7554/eLife.02866. PMC 4031984. PMID 24867644.
- Borner, G. H. H.; Hein, M. Y.; Hirst, J.; Edgar, J. R.; Mann, M.; Robinson, M. S. (2014). "Fractionation profiling: a fast and versatile approach for mapping vesicle proteomes and protein-protein interactions". Molecular Biology of the Cell. 25 (20): 3178–3194. doi:10.1091/mbc.E14-07-1198. PMC 4196868. PMID 25165137.
- Hirst, J.; Borner, G. H. H.; Edgar, J.; Hein, M. Y.; Mann, M.; Buchholz, F.; Antrobus, R.; Robinson, M. S. (2013). "Interaction between AP-5 and the hereditary spastic paraplegia proteins SPG11 and SPG15". Molecular Biology of the Cell. 24 (16): 2558–2569. doi:10.1091/mbc.E13-03-0170. PMC 3744948. PMID 23825025.
- Kozik, Patrycja; Hodson, Nicola A.; Sahlender, Daniela A.; Simecek, Nikol; Soromani, Christina; Wu, Jiahua; Collinson, Lucy M.; Robinson, Margaret S. (2012). "A human genome-wide screen for regulators of clathrin-coated vesicle formation reveals an unexpected role for the V-ATPase". Nature Cell Biology. 15 (1): 50–60. doi:10.1038/ncb2652. PMC 3588604. PMID 23263279.
- Borner, Georg H.H.; Antrobus, Robin; Hirst, Jennifer; Bhumbra, Gary S.; Kozik, Patrycja; Jackson, Lauren P.; Sahlender, Daniela A.; Robinson, Margaret S. (2012). "Multivariate proteomic profiling identifies novel accessory proteins of coated vesicles". The Journal of Cell Biology. 197 (1): 141–160. doi:10.1083/jcb.201111049. PMC 3317806. PMID 22472443.
- Hirst, Jennifer; Borner, Georg H.H.; Antrobus, Robin; Peden, Andrew A.; Hodson, Nicola A.; Sahlender, Daniela A.; Robinson, Margaret S. (2012). "Distinct and Overlapping Roles for AP-1 and GGAs Revealed by the "Knocksideways" System". Current Biology. 22 (18): 1711–1716. Bibcode:2012CBio...22.1711H. doi:10.1016/j.cub.2012.07.012. PMC 3485558. PMID 22902756.
- Miller, Sharon E.; Sahlender, Daniela A.; Graham, Stephen C.; Höning, Stefan; Robinson, Margaret S.; Peden, Andrew A.; Owen, David J. (2011). "The Molecular Basis for the Endocytosis of Small R-SNAREs by the Clathrin Adaptor CALM". Cell. 147 (5): 1118–1131. doi:10.1016/j.cell.2011.10.038. PMC 3267021. PMID 22118466.
- Schmid, Sandra L.; Hirst, Jennifer; D. Barlow, Lael; Francisco, Gabriel Casey; Sahlender, Daniela A.; Seaman, Matthew N. J.; Dacks, Joel B.; Robinson, Margaret S. (2011). "The Fifth Adaptor Protein Complex". PLOS Biology. 9 (10) e1001170. doi:10.1371/journal.pbio.1001170. PMC 3191125. PMID 22022230.
- Robinson, Margaret S.; Sahlender, Daniela A.; Foster, Samuel D. (2010). "Rapid Inactivation of Proteins by Rapamycin-Induced Rerouting to Mitochondria". Developmental Cell. 18 (2): 324–331. doi:10.1016/j.devcel.2009.12.015. PMC 2845799. PMID 20159602.

== Awards and honours ==
Robinson has received many honors working as a cellular biologist. She was awarded a Wellcome Trust Principal Research Fellowship in 1999 and in 2003 she was appointed Professor of Molecular Cell Biology. She was elected a Fellow of the Academy of Medical Sciences in 2001 and member of the European Molecular Biology Organization in the same year. She was elected a Fellow of the Royal Society (FRS) in 2012. The Wellcome Trust also has funded her research for over 25 years.
