= AP5S1 =

Protein-coding gene in the species Homo sapiens

Identifiers
- Aliases: AP5S1, C20orf29, adaptor related protein complex 5 sigma 1 subunit, adaptor related protein complex 5 subunit sigma 1
- External IDs: OMIM: 614824; MGI: 1916846; GeneCards: AP5S1

Gene location (Human)
Chr.	Chromosome 20 (human)
Band	20p13	Start	3,820,524 bp
Band	20p13	End	3,828,838 bp

Gene location (Mouse)
Chr.	Chromosome 2 (mouse)
Band	2|2 F1	Start	131,048,998 bp
Band	2|2 F1	End	131,055,434 bp
RNA expression pattern
Bgee	Human / Mouse (ortholog); Top expressed in: gonad; biceps brachii; Skeletal muscle tissue of biceps brachii; muscle of thigh; vastus lateralis muscle; apex of heart; gastrocnemius muscle; pancreatic ductal cell; right adrenal cortex; stromal cell of endometrium / Top expressed in: muscle of thigh; right kidney; crypt of lieberkuhn of small intestine; masseter muscle; fetal liver hematopoietic progenitor cell; granulocyte; left lobe of liver; jejunum; duodenum; tibiofemoral joint; More reference expression data
BioGPS	n/a
Gene ontology
Molecular function	protein binding
Cellular component	lysosomal membrane; endosome; late endosome; lysosome; AP-type membrane coat adaptor complex; membrane; late endosome membrane; nucleoplasm; cytoplasm; cytosol
Biological process	protein transport; endosomal transport; double-strand break repair via homologous recombination; DNA repair; cellular response to DNA damage stimulus
Sources:Amigo / QuickGO
Orthologs
Databases	NCBI: entry; OMA: entry
Species	Human	Mouse
Entrez	55317	69596
Ensembl	ENSG00000125843	ENSMUSG00000068264
UniProt	Q9NUS5	Q9D742
RefSeq (mRNA)	NM_018347; NM_001204446; NM_001204447	NM_001291031; NM_001291032; NM_027129; NM_001355593
RefSeq (protein)	NP_001191375; NP_001191376; NP_060817	NP_001277960; NP_001277961; NP_081405; NP_001342522
Location (UCSC)	Chr 20: 3.82 – 3.83 Mb	Chr 2: 131.05 – 131.06 Mb
PubMed search
- Wikidata
View/Edit Human	View/Edit Mouse

AP-5 complex subunit sigma (AP5S1) is a protein that in humans is encoded by the AP5S1 gene.

== Function ==
The protein encoded by this gene is the small subunit of the AP5 adaptor complex. Variants in this gene have not been implicated in any disease but damaging variants in AP5Z1, the gene encoding one of the large subunits in this complex, are associated with SPG48, a type of hereditary spastic paraplegia. In addition, damaging variants in the genes encoding two proteins that stably associate with the AP-5 adaptor complex are also associated with forms of hereditary spastic paraplegia - SPG11 with the disease of the same name and ZFYVE26 with SPG15.
