= AFTPH =

Protein-coding gene in humans

Identifiers
- Aliases: AFTPH, Nbla10388, aftiphilin
- External IDs: MGI: 1923012; HomoloGene: 9764; GeneCards: AFTPH; OMA:AFTPH - orthologs

Gene location (Human)
Chr.	Chromosome 2 (human)
Band	2p14	Start	64,524,305 bp
Band	2p14	End	64,593,005 bp

Gene location (Mouse)
Chr.	Chromosome 11 (mouse)
Band	11|11 A3.1	Start	20,635,084 bp
Band	11|11 A3.1	End	20,691,589 bp
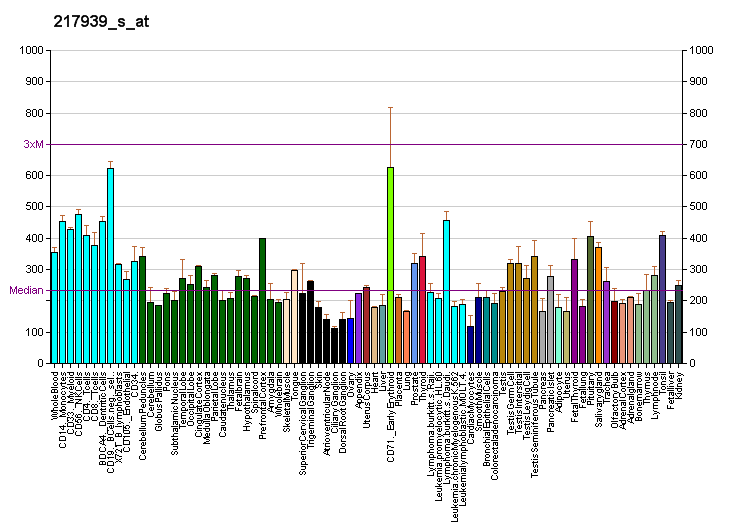
RNA expression pattern
Bgee	Human / Mouse (ortholog); Top expressed in: renal medulla; male germ cell; sperm; buccal mucosa cell; cardia; epithelium of nasopharynx; cerebellar vermis; mucosa of ileum; beta cell; pylorus / Top expressed in: dentate gyrus of hippocampal formation granule cell; spermatocyte; submandibular gland; lacrimal gland; dorsomedial hypothalamic nucleus; neural layer of retina; habenula; vestibular sensory epithelium; granulocyte; olfactory epithelium; More reference expression data
BioGPS	More reference expression data
Gene ontology
Molecular function	clathrin binding
Cellular component	AP-1 adaptor complex; cytosol; Golgi apparatus; intracellular membrane-bounded organelle; nucleus; cytoplasm; trans-Golgi network membrane
Biological process	protein transport; intracellular transport
Sources:Amigo / QuickGO
Orthologs
Species	Human	Mouse
Entrez	54812	216549
Ensembl	ENSG00000119844	ENSMUSG00000049659
UniProt	Q6ULP2	Q80WT5
RefSeq (mRNA)	NM_001002243; NM_017657; NM_203437	NM_001252503; NM_001290545; NM_181411
RefSeq (protein)	NP_001002243; NP_060127; NP_982261; NP_001362898; NP_001362899 NP_001362900; NP_001362901; NP_001362902	NP_001239432; NP_001277474; NP_852076
Location (UCSC)	Chr 2: 64.52 – 64.59 Mb	Chr 11: 20.64 – 20.69 Mb
PubMed search
- Wikidata
View/Edit Human	View/Edit Mouse

Clathrin-binding box of Aftiphilin

Identifiers
- Symbol: Clathrin_bdg
- Pfam: PF15045
- InterPro: IPR029205
Available protein structures:
- PDB: IPR029205 PF15045 (ECOD; PDBsum)
- AlphaFold: IPR029205; PF15045

Aftiphilin is a protein that in humans is encoded by the AFTPH gene. It forms a stable complex with p200 and synergin gamma. It contains a clathrin box with two known clathrin-binding sequence motifs, is involved in vesicle trafficking and is found in many eukaryotes.
