= AP5B1 =

Protein-coding gene in the species Homo sapiens

Identifiers
- Aliases: AP5B1, AP-5, PP1030, adaptor related protein complex 5 beta 1 subunit, adaptor related protein complex 5 subunit beta 1
- External IDs: OMIM: 614367; MGI: 2685808; GeneCards: AP5B1

Gene location (Human)
Chr.	Chromosome 11 (human)
Band	11q13.1	Start	65,773,898 bp
Band	11q13.1	End	65,780,976 bp

Gene location (Mouse)
Chr.	Chromosome 19 (mouse)
Band	19|19 A	Start	5,618,053 bp
Band	19|19 A	End	5,621,289 bp
RNA expression pattern
Bgee	Human / Mouse (ortholog); Top expressed in: monocyte; bone marrow cell; blood; granulocyte; pancreatic ductal cell; gastrocnemius muscle; right lung; mucosa of transverse colon; upper lobe of left lung; buccal mucosa cell / Top expressed in: granulocyte; spermatocyte; gastrula; seminiferous tubule; right kidney; bone marrow; proximal tubule; submandibular gland; jejunum; otic vesicle; More reference expression data
BioGPS	n/a
Gene ontology
Molecular function	protein binding
Cellular component	lysosomal membrane; AP-type membrane coat adaptor complex
Biological process	endosomal transport; protein transport; transport
Sources:Amigo / QuickGO
Orthologs
Databases	NCBI: entry; OMA: entry
Species	Human	Mouse
Entrez	91056	381201
Ensembl	ENSG00000254470	ENSMUSG00000049562
UniProt	Q2VPB7	Q3TAP4
RefSeq (mRNA)	NM_138368	NM_001033448; NM_001362046
RefSeq (protein)	NP_612377	NP_001028620; NP_001348975
Location (UCSC)	Chr 11: 65.77 – 65.78 Mb	Chr 19: 5.62 – 5.62 Mb
PubMed search
- Wikidata
View/Edit Human	View/Edit Mouse

AP-5 complex subunit beta (AP5B1) is a protein that in humans is encoded by the AP5B1 gene.

== Function ==
The protein encoded by this gene is one of two large subunits of the AP5 adaptor complex. Variants in this gene have not been implicated in any disease but damaging variants in AP5Z1, the gene encoding the other large subunit in this complex, are associated with SPG48, a type of hereditary spastic paraplegia. In addition, damaging variants in the genes encoding two proteins that stably associate with the AP-5 adaptor complex are also associated with forms of hereditary spastic paraplegia - SPG11 with the disease of the same name and ZFYVE26 with SPG15.

GnomAD reports an observed v. expected ratio of predicted loss-of-function variants of 0.84 (0.58 - 1.24) for AP5B1.
