= MEDNIK syndrome =

- Other names: Intellectual disability-enteropathy-deafness-peripheral neuropathy-ichthyosis-keratodermia syndrome

MEDNIK syndrome, (OMIM#609313), known in French as "syndrome de Kamouraska" (Kamouraska's syndrome), is a genetic disorder that is caused by mutations to the AP1S1 gene. Transmission of the disease is believed to be autosomal recessive. Symptoms of the syndrome are mental disability, enteropathy, deafness, neuropathy, ichthyosis, and keratoderma (MEDNIK). People with MEDNIK syndrome often have a high forehead, upslanting palpebral fissures, a depressed nasal bridge, low-set ears, growth retardation, and brain atrophy apparent upon imaging. The disorder was discovered by Patrick Cossette and his research team from the Université de Montréal. MEDNIK syndrome was initially reported in a few French-Canadian families near Quebec who all shared common ancestors.

MEDNIK syndrome has been shown to create a defect in copper metabolism. Before MEDNIK, the only two inherited copper metabolism disorders known were Menkes disease and Wilson's disease. Menkes and Wilson's disease are both caused by mutations in copper ATPases that are distinct for each disease. Both ATPases, ATP7A (Menkes) and ATP7B (Wilson's) are located in the trans-Golgi network and are responsible for transporting copper to cuproenzymes synthesized within the secretory compartments. Patients with MEDNIK syndrome have been shown to display combined clinical and biochemical signs of both Menkes and Wilson's diseases.

The transport of copper, recycling of copper ATPases, and copper detoxification are reliant on proper intracellular copper trafficking. The defect in the AP1S1 gene causes improper function and trafficking of copper ATPases resulting in less retention in the trans-Golgi and excess copper in the plasma membrane.

== Cause ==
The mutation that causes the MEDNIK syndrome occurs in the gene, AP1S1, which codes for the smallest subunit of the AP1 adaptor complex. The AP-1 complex is one of five adaptor protein complexes that are found in eukaryotic cells. AP complexes mediate trafficking linking clathrin or other coat proteins to receptors in coated vesicles, selectively sorting cargo between cell membrane, trans-Golgi network, and endosomal compartments. The AP-1 complex is found in the trans-Golgi network and is responsible for controlling AP-1-coated vesicles and the trafficking of the ATPase's ATP7A and ATP7B. A mutation in AP1S1 causes abnormal intracellular copper trafficking which subsequently affects copper-dependent enzymes leading to the symptoms of MEDNIK disease.

== Management ==
There is currently no cure or treatments tailored directly toward MEDNIK syndrome. However, symptoms can be treated on an individual basis. Treatments can include: diuretics, steroids, pain medications, antidepressants, hydrotherapy, anti-inflammatories, and antibiotics.

== Sources ==
- Martinelli, D. & Dionisi-Vici, C. (2014). "AP1S1 defect causing MEDNIK syndrome: a new adaptinopathy associated with defective copper metabolism". Ann. N.Y. Acad. Sci. 1314 (1): 55–63. Bibcode:2014NYASA1314...55M. doi:10.1111/nyas.12426. PMID 24754424. S2CID 29895261.
- Martinelli, D.; Travaglini, L.; Drouin, C.A.; Ceballos-Picot, I.; Rizza, T.; Bertini, E.; Carrozzo, R.; Petrini, S.; Lonlay, P.D.; Hachem, M.E.; Hubert, L.; Montpetit, A.; Torre, G.; Dionisi-Vici, C.; Mar, B. (2013). "MEDNIK syndrome: a novel defect of copper metabolism treatable by zinc acetate therapy". Brain. 136 (3): 872–881. doi:10.1093/brain/awt012. PMID 23423674.
- "NHS Choices".
- Rychik, J.; Spray, T.L. (2002). "Strategies to treat protein-losing enteropathy". Seminars in Thoracic and Cardiovascular Surgery: Pediatric Cardiac Surgery Annual. 5: 3–11. doi:10.1053/pcsu.2002.31498. PMID 11994860.
