= AP1B1 =

Protein-coding gene in the species Homo sapiens

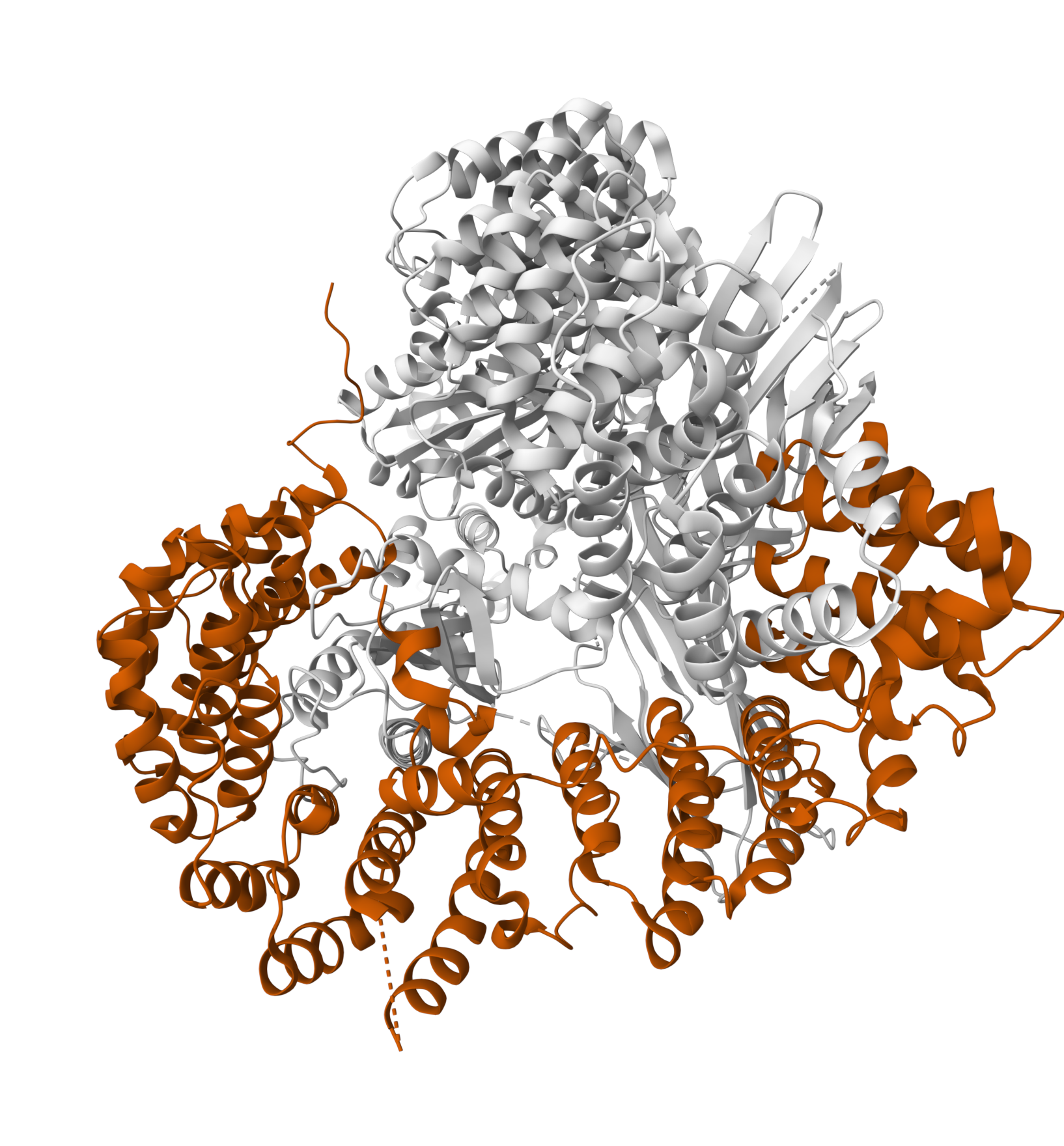

Identifiers
- Aliases: AP1B1, ADTB1, AP105A, BAM22, CLAPB2, adaptor related protein complex 1 beta 1 subunit, adaptor related protein complex 1 subunit beta 1, KIDAR
- External IDs: OMIM: 600157; MGI: 1096368; GeneCards: AP1B1
Available structures
PDB	Ortholog search: PDBe RCSB
PDB	List of PDB id codes 4HMY, 4P6Z

Gene location (Human)
Chr.	Chromosome 22 (human)
Band	22q12.2	Start	29,327,680 bp
Band	22q12.2	End	29,423,179 bp

Gene location (Mouse)
Chr.	Chromosome 11 (mouse)
Band	11|11 A1	Start	4,936,824 bp
Band	11|11 A1	End	4,992,791 bp
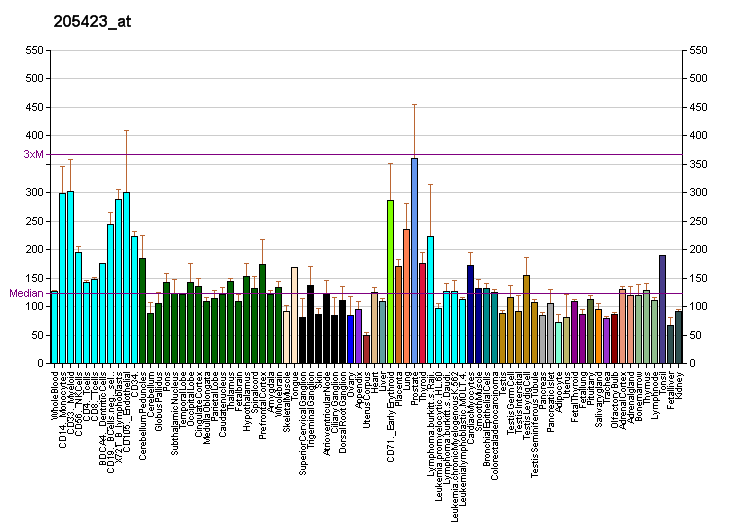
RNA expression pattern
Bgee	Human / Mouse (ortholog); Top expressed in: middle frontal gyrus; paraflocculus of cerebellum; Brodmann area 10; frontal pole; mucosa of transverse colon; right adrenal cortex; spleen; lymph node; left adrenal gland; mucosa of esophagus / Top expressed in: neural layer of retina; fetal liver hematopoietic progenitor cell; stroma of bone marrow; dentate gyrus of hippocampal formation granule cell; primary visual cortex; superior frontal gyrus; lip; yolk sac; cerebellar cortex; entorhinal cortex; More reference expression data
BioGPS	More reference expression data
Gene ontology
Molecular function	transporter activity; protein binding; protein kinase binding; clathrin binding
Cellular component	trans-Golgi network membrane; membrane; Golgi membrane; lysosomal membrane; clathrin-coated vesicle membrane; membrane coat; cytoplasmic vesicle membrane; cytoplasmic vesicle; clathrin adaptor complex; Golgi apparatus; cytosol; intracellular membrane-bounded organelle
Biological process	antigen processing and presentation of exogenous peptide antigen via MHC class II; mitigation of host defenses by virus; development of the heart; determination of left/right symmetry; protein transport; intracellular protein transport; vesicle-mediated transport
Sources:Amigo / QuickGO
Orthologs
Databases	NCBI: entry; OMA: entry
Species	Human	Mouse
Entrez	162	11764
Ensembl	ENSG00000100280	ENSMUSG00000009090
UniProt	Q10567	O35643
RefSeq (mRNA)	NM_145730; NM_001127; NM_001166019	NM_001243043; NM_001243044; NM_007454; NM_001355659; NM_001355660
RefSeq (protein)	NP_001118; NP_001159491; NP_663782; NP_001365491; NP_001365492 NP_001365493; NP_001365494; NP_001365495	NP_001229972; NP_001229973; NP_031480; NP_001342588; NP_001342589
Location (UCSC)	Chr 22: 29.33 – 29.42 Mb	Chr 11: 4.94 – 4.99 Mb
PubMed search
- Wikidata
View/Edit Human	View/Edit Mouse

AP-1 complex subunit beta-1 is a protein that in humans is encoded by the AP1B1 gene.

Adaptor protein complex 1 is found at the cytoplasmic face of coated vesicles located at the Golgi complex, where it mediates both the recruitment of clathrin to the membrane and the recognition of sorting signals within the cytosolic tails of transmembrane receptors. This complex is a heterotetramer composed of two large, one medium, and one small adaptin subunit. The protein encoded by this gene serves as one of the large subunits of this complex and is a member of the adaptin protein family. This gene is a candidate meningioma gene. Two transcript variants encoding different isoforms have been found for this gene, and variants utilizing alternative polyadenylation signals exist.

== Interactions ==
AP1B1 has been shown to interact with KIF13A and AP1G1.
