= RAB10 =

Protein-coding gene in the species Homo sapiens

Identifiers
- Aliases: RAB10, member RAS oncogene family
- External IDs: OMIM: 612672; MGI: 105066; GeneCards: RAB10
Enzyme activity
EC #	BRENDA	ExPASy	KEGG	MetaCyc
3.6.5.2	↗	↗	↗	↗

Gene location (Human)
Chr.	Chromosome 2 (human)
Band	2p23.3	Start	26,034,084 bp
Band	2p23.3	End	26,137,454 bp

Gene location (Mouse)
Chr.	Chromosome 12 (mouse)
Band	12 A1.1|12 1.71 cM	Start	3,297,428 bp
Band	12 A1.1|12 1.71 cM	End	3,359,969 bp
RNA expression pattern
Bgee	Human / Mouse (ortholog); Top expressed in: pancreatic epithelial cell; mucosa of ileum; pancreatic ductal cell; endothelial cell; tibialis anterior muscle; gingival epithelium; vastus lateralis muscle; deltoid muscle; mucosa of pharynx; oral cavity / Top expressed in: vastus lateralis muscle; ascending aorta; muscle of thigh; aortic valve; knee joint; dorsomedial hypothalamic nucleus; skin of external ear; ventral tegmental area; median eminence; medial head of gastrocnemius muscle; More reference expression data
BioGPS	n/a
Gene ontology
Molecular function	nucleotide binding; GDP binding; GTP binding; myosin V binding; protein binding; cadherin binding involved in cell-cell adhesion; GTPase activity
Cellular component	recycling endosome; endosome; phagocytic vesicle membrane; Golgi apparatus; cell projection; endoplasmic reticulum membrane; membrane; focal adhesion; insulin-responsive compartment; Golgi membrane; endoplasmic reticulum tubular network; recycling endosome membrane; exocyst; endoplasmic reticulum; endosome membrane; extracellular exosome; cytoplasmic vesicle membrane; cytoplasmic vesicle; trans-Golgi network; cytosol; plasma membrane; cilium; secretory granule membrane; exocytic vesicle; cytoplasm; synaptic vesicle; perinuclear region of cytoplasm
Biological process	endoplasmic reticulum tubular network organization; polarized epithelial cell differentiation; antigen processing and presentation; establishment of neuroblast polarity; axonogenesis; establishment of protein localization to membrane; endosomal transport; cellular response to insulin stimulus; protein transport; establishment of protein localization to endoplasmic reticulum membrane; protein localization to plasma membrane; Golgi to plasma membrane transport; vesicle-mediated transport; Golgi to plasma membrane protein transport; cell-cell adhesion; neutrophil degranulation; vesicle docking involved in exocytosis; protein secretion; regulation of exocytosis; transport; protein localization to basolateral plasma membrane; intracellular protein transport; Rab protein signal transduction
Sources:Amigo / QuickGO
Orthologs
Databases	NCBI: entry; OMA: entry
Species	Human	Mouse
Entrez	10890	19325
Ensembl	ENSG00000084733	ENSMUSG00000020671
UniProt	P61026	P61027
RefSeq (mRNA)	NM_016131	NM_016676
RefSeq (protein)	NP_057215	NP_057885
Location (UCSC)	Chr 2: 26.03 – 26.14 Mb	Chr 12: 3.3 – 3.36 Mb
PubMed search
- Wikidata
View/Edit Human	View/Edit Mouse

Ras-related protein Rab-10 is a protein that in humans is encoded by the RAB10 gene.

== Interactions ==
RAB10 has been shown to interact with AP1S1.
