= Intersectin 1 =

Protein-coding gene in the species Homo sapiens

ITSN1
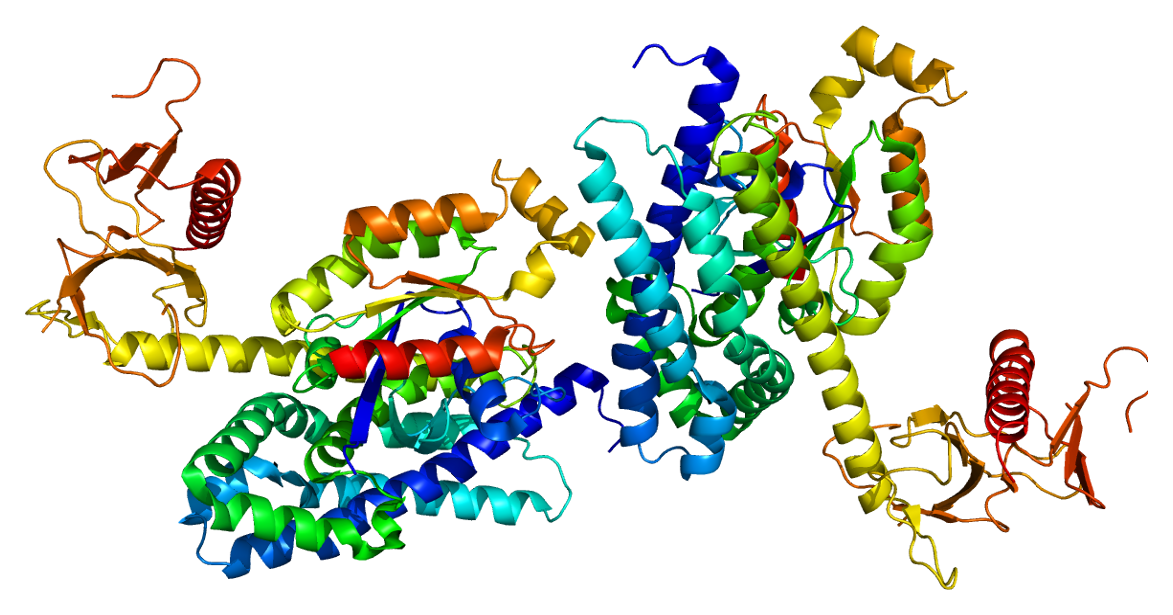

Identifiers
- Aliases: ITSN1, ITSN, SH3D1A, SH3P17, intersectin 1
- External IDs: OMIM: 602442; MGI: 1338069; GeneCards: ITSN1
Available structures
PDB	Ortholog search: PDBe RCSB
PDB	List of PDB id codes 1KI1, 2KGR, 2KHN, 3QBV, 4IIM

Gene location (Human)
Chr.	Chromosome 21 (human)
Band	21q22.11	Start	33,642,400 bp
Band	21q22.11	End	33,899,861 bp

Gene location (Mouse)
Chr.	Chromosome 16 (mouse)
Band	16|16 C4	Start	91,526,169 bp
Band	16|16 C4	End	91,717,485 bp
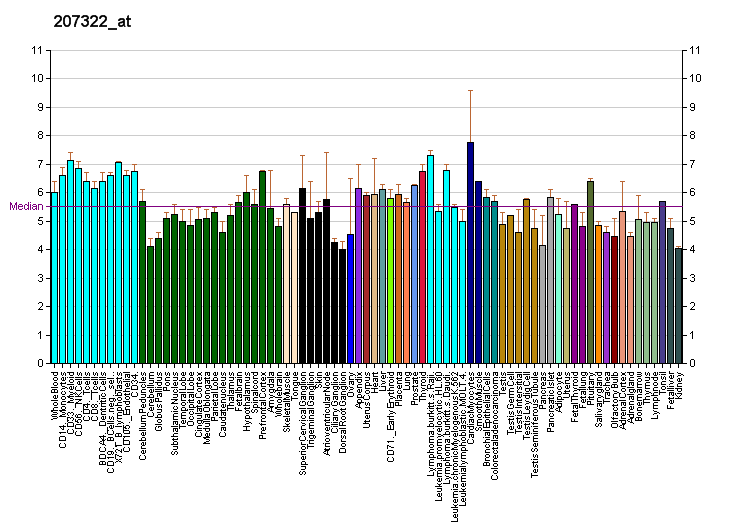

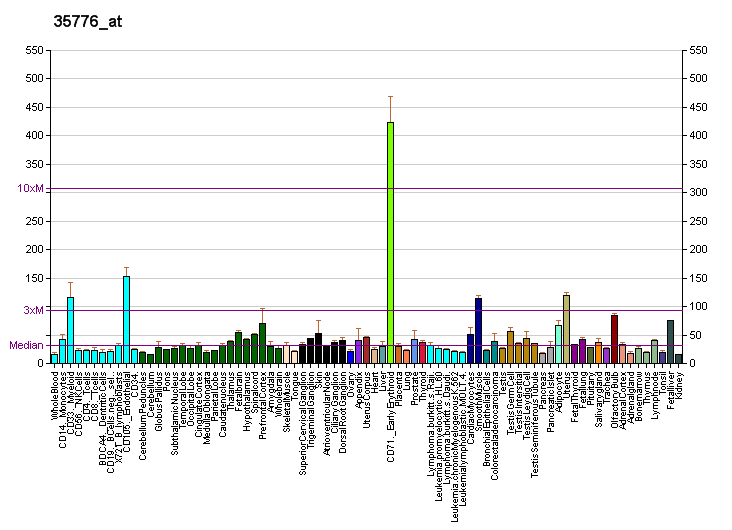

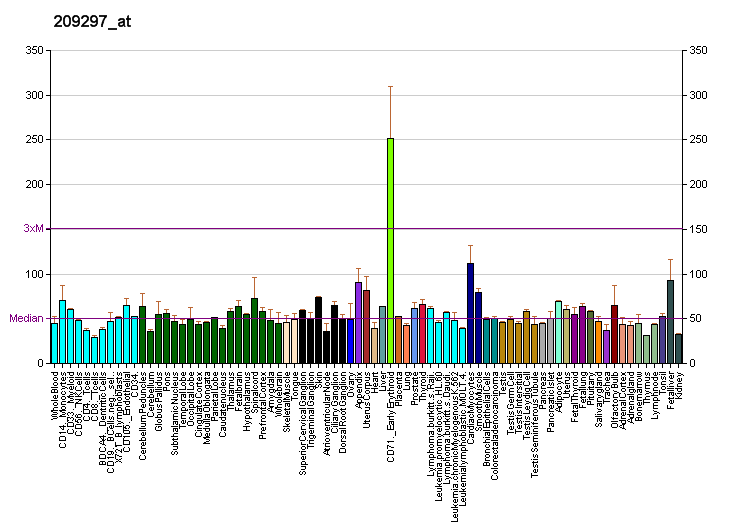
RNA expression pattern
Bgee	Human / Mouse (ortholog); Top expressed in: sural nerve; tibia; saphenous vein; parietal pleura; optic nerve; adipose tissue; pericardium; subcutaneous adipose tissue; abdominal fat; ganglionic eminence / Top expressed in: Rostral migratory stream; ciliary body; genital tubercle; tail of embryo; primitive streak; cumulus cell; sciatic nerve; dentate gyrus of hippocampal formation granule cell; stroma of bone marrow; masseter muscle; More reference expression data
BioGPS	More reference expression data
Gene ontology
Molecular function	calcium ion binding; metal ion binding; protein binding; kinase activator activity; molecular adaptor activity; proline-rich region binding; guanyl-nucleotide exchange factor activity
Cellular component	cytosol; cell projection; membrane; plasma membrane; endocytic vesicle; synapse; cell junction; neuron projection; clathrin-coated pit; endomembrane system; lamellipodium; calyx of Held; presynaptic endocytic zone; nucleus; nuclear envelope; cytoplasm; endosome; cytoplasmic vesicle; recycling endosome; soma; dendritic spine; apical dendrite; intracellular vesicle; postsynaptic actin cytoskeleton; glutamatergic synapse
Biological process	negative regulation of neuron apoptotic process; positive regulation of protein kinase B signaling; intracellular signal transduction; endocytosis; ephrin receptor signaling pathway; synaptic vesicle endocytosis; positive regulation of apoptotic process; positive regulation of phosphorylation; regulation of Rho protein signal transduction; regulation of small GTPase mediated signal transduction; small GTPase mediated signal transduction; membrane organization; viral process; G protein-coupled receptor signaling pathway; positive regulation of kinase activity; exocytosis; protein transport; brain development; positive regulation of growth hormone secretion; positive regulation of dendritic spine development; regulation of modification of postsynaptic actin cytoskeleton; positive regulation of caveolin-mediated endocytosis; positive regulation of GTPase activity
Sources:Amigo / QuickGO
Orthologs
Databases	NCBI: entry; OMA: entry
Species	Human	Mouse
Entrez	6453	16443
Ensembl	ENSG00000205726	ENSMUSG00000022957
UniProt	Q15811; Q6J334	Q9Z0R4
RefSeq (mRNA)	NM_001001132; NM_003024; NM_001331008; NM_001331009; NM_001331010 NM_001331011; NM_001331012	NM_001110275; NM_001110276; NM_010587
RefSeq (protein)	NP_001001132; NP_001317937; NP_001317938; NP_001317939; NP_001317940 NP_001317941; NP_003015	NP_001103745; NP_001103746; NP_034717
Location (UCSC)	Chr 21: 33.64 – 33.9 Mb	Chr 16: 91.53 – 91.72 Mb
PubMed search
- Wikidata
View/Edit Human	View/Edit Mouse

Intersectin-1 is a protein that, in humans, is encoded by the ITSN1 gene.

== Function ==
The protein encoded by this gene is a cytoplasmic membrane-associated protein that indirectly coordinates endocytic membrane traffic with the actin assembly machinery. In addition, the encoded protein may regulate the formation of clathrin-coated vesicles and could be involved in synaptic vesicle recycling. This protein has been shown to interact with dynamin, CDC42, SNAP23, SNAP25, SPIN90, EPS15, EPN1, EPN2, and STN2. Multiple transcript variants encoding different isoforms have been found for this gene, but the full-length nature of only two of them have been characterized so far.

== Interactions ==
ITSN1 has been shown to interact with:

- CDC42,
- SCAMP1
- SNAP-25, and
- SOS1.
