= AP1S2 =

Protein-coding gene in humans

Identifiers
- Aliases: AP1S2, MGC:1902, MRX59, MRXS21, MRXS5, MRXSF, PGS, SIGMA1B, DC22, adaptor related protein complex 1 sigma 2 subunit, adaptor related protein complex 1 subunit sigma 2
- External IDs: OMIM: 300629; MGI: 1889383; GeneCards: AP1S2

Gene location (Human)
Chr.	X chromosome (human)
Band	Xp22.2	Start	15,825,806 bp
Band	Xp22.2	End	15,854,931 bp

Gene location (Mouse)
Chr.	X chromosome (mouse)
Band	X|X F5	Start	162,692,013 bp
Band	X|X F5	End	162,716,662 bp
RNA expression pattern
Bgee	Human / Mouse (ortholog); Top expressed in: corpus epididymis; tail of epididymis; monocyte; retinal pigment epithelium; Skeletal muscle tissue of rectus abdominis; right ventricle; biceps brachii; pons; muscle of thigh; ganglionic eminence / Top expressed in: substantia nigra; paraventricular nucleus of hypothalamus; arcuate nucleus; mammillary body; efferent ductule; lateral hypothalamus; supraoptic nucleus; medial vestibular nucleus; median eminence; pontine nuclei; More reference expression data
BioGPS	n/a
Gene ontology
Molecular function	protein binding
Cellular component	cytosol; Golgi apparatus; trans-Golgi network membrane; intracellular membrane-bounded organelle; membrane; Golgi membrane; lysosomal membrane; AP-type membrane coat adaptor complex; membrane coat; clathrin-coated pit; cytoplasmic vesicle membrane; cytoplasmic vesicle
Biological process	antigen processing and presentation of exogenous peptide antigen via MHC class II; mitigation of host defenses by virus; protein transport; intracellular protein transport; vesicle-mediated transport
Sources:Amigo / QuickGO
Orthologs
Databases	NCBI: entry; OMA: entry
Species	Human	Mouse
Entrez	8905	108012
Ensembl	ENSG00000182287	ENSMUSG00000031367
UniProt	P56377; Q549M9	Q9DB50
RefSeq (mRNA)	NM_001272071; NM_003916; NM_001368994; NM_001369007; NM_001369008	NM_001290378; NM_001290379; NM_026887
RefSeq (protein)	NP_001259000; NP_003907; NP_001355923; NP_001355936; NP_001355937 NP_003907.3	NP_001277307; NP_001277308; NP_081163
Location (UCSC)	Chr X: 15.83 – 15.85 Mb	Chr X: 162.69 – 162.72 Mb
PubMed search
- Wikidata
View/Edit Human	View/Edit Mouse

AP-1 complex subunit sigma-2 is a protein that in humans is encoded by the AP1S2 gene.

== Function ==
Adaptor protein complex 1 is found at the cytoplasmic face of coated vesicles located at the Golgi complex, where it mediates both the recruitment of clathrin to the membrane and the recognition of sorting signals within the cytosolic tails of transmembrane receptors. This complex is a heterotetramer composed of two large, one medium, and one small adaptin subunit. The protein encoded by this gene serves as the small subunit of this complex and is a member of the adaptin protein family. Transcript variants utilizing alternative polyadenylation signals exist for this gene.

== Pathology ==
Mutations of the AP1S2 gene cause the Pettigrew syndrome, which is characterized by mental retardation and additional highly variable features, including choreoathetosis, hydrocephalus, Dandy–Walker malformation, seizures, and iron or calcium deposition in the brain.
