= SCAMP1 =

Protein-coding gene in the species Homo sapiens

Identifiers
- Aliases: SCAMP1, SCAMP, SCAMP37, secretory carrier membrane protein 1
- External IDs: OMIM: 606911; MGI: 1349480; GeneCards: SCAMP1

Gene location (Human)
Chr.	Chromosome 5 (human)
Band	5q14.1	Start	78,360,611 bp
Band	5q14.1	End	78,480,739 bp

Gene location (Mouse)
Chr.	Chromosome 13 (mouse)
Band	13|13 C3	Start	94,337,818 bp
Band	13|13 C3	End	94,422,365 bp
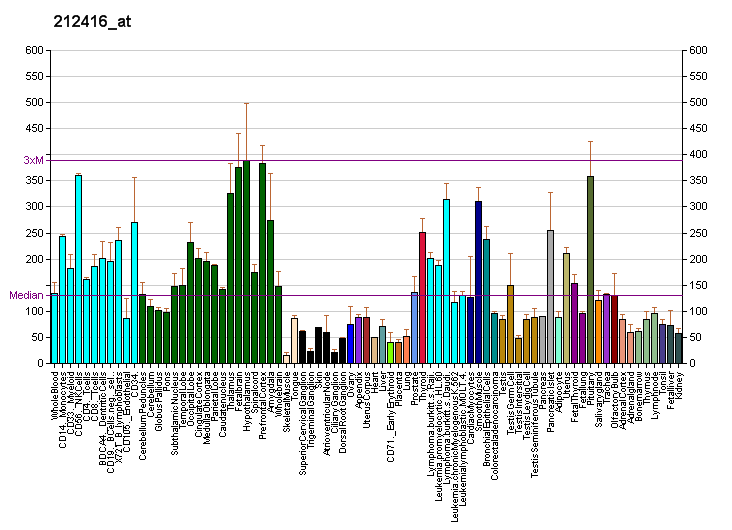

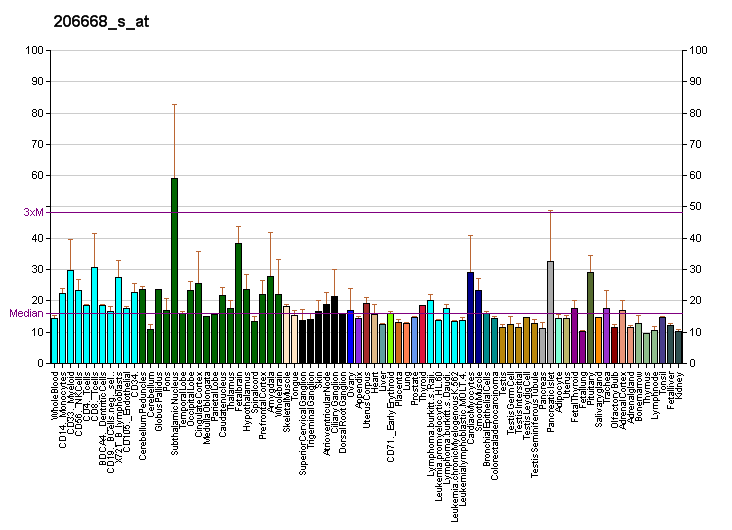

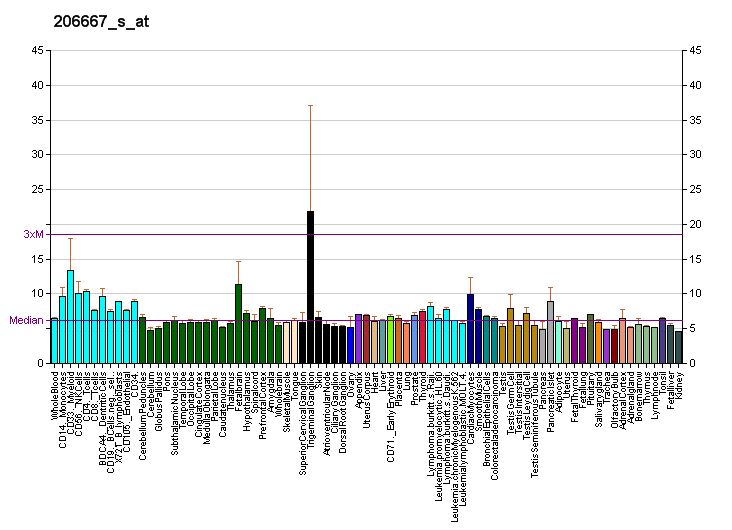
RNA expression pattern
Bgee	Human / Mouse (ortholog); Top expressed in: retinal pigment epithelium; Epithelium of choroid plexus; lateral nuclear group of thalamus; superior vestibular nucleus; Brodmann area 23; islet of Langerhans; secondary oocyte; buccal mucosa cell; cartilage tissue; seminal vesicula / Top expressed in: ventral tegmental area; habenula; olfactory tubercle; dorsomedial hypothalamic nucleus; dorsal tegmental nucleus; spermatid; paraventricular nucleus of hypothalamus; globus pallidus; seminal vesicula; medial vestibular nucleus; More reference expression data
BioGPS	More reference expression data
Gene ontology
Molecular function	protein binding
Cellular component	membrane; integral component of membrane; endosome; recycling endosome membrane; trans-Golgi network; Golgi apparatus; synapse; synaptic vesicle membrane; zymogen granule membrane; clathrin-coated vesicle; plasma membrane; specific granule membrane; cytoplasmic vesicle membrane; Golgi membrane; trans-Golgi network membrane
Biological process	protein transport; post-Golgi vesicle-mediated transport; exocytosis; neutrophil degranulation
Sources:Amigo / QuickGO
Orthologs
Databases	NCBI: entry; OMA: entry
Species	Human	Mouse
Entrez	9522	107767
Ensembl	ENSG00000085365	ENSMUSG00000021687
UniProt	O15126	Q8K021
RefSeq (mRNA)	NM_001290229; NM_004866; NM_052822	NM_029153; NM_001346609
RefSeq (protein)	NP_001277158; NP_004857	NP_001333538; NP_083429
Location (UCSC)	Chr 5: 78.36 – 78.48 Mb	Chr 13: 94.34 – 94.42 Mb
PubMed search
- Wikidata
View/Edit Human	View/Edit Mouse

Secretory carrier-associated membrane protein 1 is a protein that in humans is encoded by the SCAMP1 gene.

== Function ==
This gene product belongs to the SCAMP family of proteins which are secretory carrier membrane proteins. They function as carriers to the cell surface in post-golgi recycling pathways. Different family members are highly related products of distinct genes, and are usually expressed together. These findings suggest that the SCAMPs may function at the same site during vesicular transport rather than in separate pathways.

== Interactions ==
SCAMP1 has been shown to interact with ITSN1 and AP1GBP1.
