= Synergin gamma =

Protein-coding gene in the species Homo sapiens

SYNRG
Available structures
PDB	Ortholog search: PDBe RCSB
PDB	List of PDB id codes 2MX7

Identifiers
- Aliases: SYNRG, AP1GBP1, SYNG, synergin, gamma, synergin gamma
- External IDs: OMIM: 607291; MGI: 1354742; HomoloGene: 105680; GeneCards: SYNRG; OMA:SYNRG - orthologs

Gene location (Human)
Chr.	Chromosome 17 (human)
Band	17q12	Start	37,514,807 bp
Band	17q12	End	37,609,472 bp

Gene location (Mouse)
Chr.	Chromosome 11 (mouse)
Band	11|11 C	Start	83,855,254 bp
Band	11|11 C	End	83,935,404 bp
RNA expression pattern
Bgee	Human / Mouse (ortholog); Top expressed in: bone marrow cells; tonsil; epithelium of colon; sural nerve; lymph node; islet of Langerhans; granulocyte; appendix; corpus callosum; ganglionic eminence / Top expressed in: zygote; spermatocyte; spermatid; muscle of thigh; dentate gyrus of hippocampal formation granule cell; secondary oocyte; granulocyte; neural layer of retina; ventricular zone; superior frontal gyrus; More reference expression data
BioGPS	n/a
Gene ontology
Molecular function	protein binding
Cellular component	cytoplasm; AP-1 adaptor complex; Golgi apparatus; membrane
Biological process	protein transport; intracellular protein transport; endocytosis
Sources:Amigo / QuickGO
Orthologs
Species	Human	Mouse
Entrez	11276	217030
Ensembl	ENSG00000275066; ENSG00000274047	ENSMUSG00000034940
UniProt	Q9UMZ2	Q5SV85
RefSeq (mRNA)	NM_001163544; NM_001163545; NM_001163546; NM_001163547; NM_007247 NM_080550; NM_198882	NM_001115009; NM_194341
RefSeq (protein)	NP_001157016; NP_001157017; NP_001157018; NP_001157019; NP_009178 NP_542117; NP_942583	NP_919322; NP_001392038; NP_001392041; NP_001392042; NP_001392044 NP_001392045; NP_001392047; NP_001392050; NP_001392051; NP_001392052
Location (UCSC)	Chr 17: 37.51 – 37.61 Mb	Chr 11: 83.86 – 83.94 Mb
PubMed search
- Wikidata
View/Edit Human	View/Edit Mouse

Synergin gamma also known as AP1 subunit gamma-binding protein 1 (AP1GBP1) is a protein that in humans is encoded by the SYNRG gene.

== Function ==
This gene encodes a protein that interacts with the gamma subunit of AP1 clathrin-adaptor complex. The AP1 complex is located at the trans-Golgi network and associates specific proteins with clathrin-coated vesicles. This encoded protein may act to connect the AP1 complex to other proteins. Alternatively spliced transcript variants that encode different isoforms have been described for this gene.

== Interactions ==
AP1GBP1 has been shown to interact with AP1G1 and SCAMP1.
