= NECAP2 =

Protein-coding gene in humans

Identifiers
- Aliases: NECAP2, NECAP endocytosis associated 2
- External IDs: OMIM: 611624; MGI: 1913397; GeneCards: NECAP2

Gene location (Human)
Chr.	Chromosome 1 (human)
Band	1p36.13	Start	16,440,721 bp
Band	1p36.13	End	16,460,078 bp

Gene location (Mouse)
Chr.	Chromosome 4 (mouse)
Band	4|4 D3	Start	140,793,823 bp
Band	4|4 D3	End	140,805,668 bp
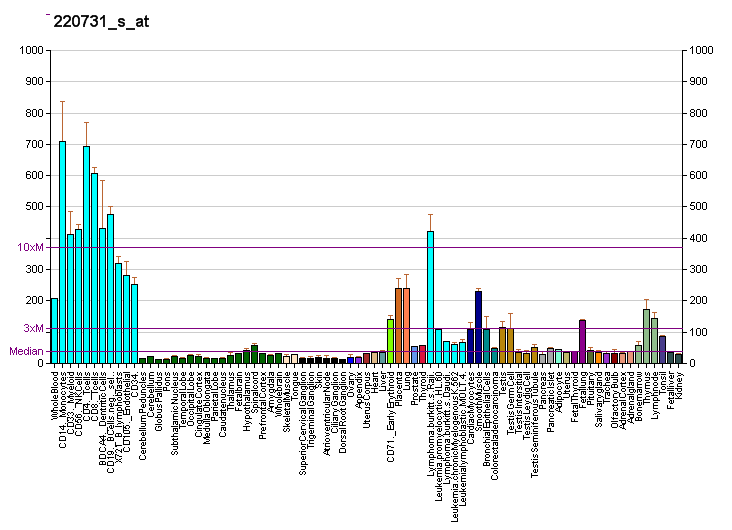
RNA expression pattern
Bgee	Human / Mouse (ortholog); Top expressed in: oocyte; granulocyte; monocyte; spleen; lymph node; secondary oocyte; appendix; stromal cell of endometrium; right lung; upper lobe of left lung / Top expressed in: stroma of bone marrow; granulocyte; lip; right kidney; gastrula; blood; lens; yolk sac; spermatocyte; stomach; More reference expression data
BioGPS	More reference expression data
Orthologs
Databases	NCBI: entry; OMA: entry
Species	Human	Mouse
Entrez	55707	66147
Ensembl	ENSG00000157191	ENSMUSG00000028923
UniProt	Q9NVZ3	Q9D1J1
RefSeq (mRNA)	NM_001145277; NM_001145278; NM_018090	NM_025383
RefSeq (protein)	NP_001138749; NP_001138750; NP_060560	NP_079659
Location (UCSC)	Chr 1: 16.44 – 16.46 Mb	Chr 4: 140.79 – 140.81 Mb
PubMed search
- Wikidata
View/Edit Human	View/Edit Mouse

Adaptin ear-binding coat-associated protein 2 is a protein that in humans is encoded by the NECAP2 gene.

== Interactions ==
NECAP2 has been shown to interact with AP1G1.
