= AP1G1 =

Protein-coding gene in the species Homo sapiens

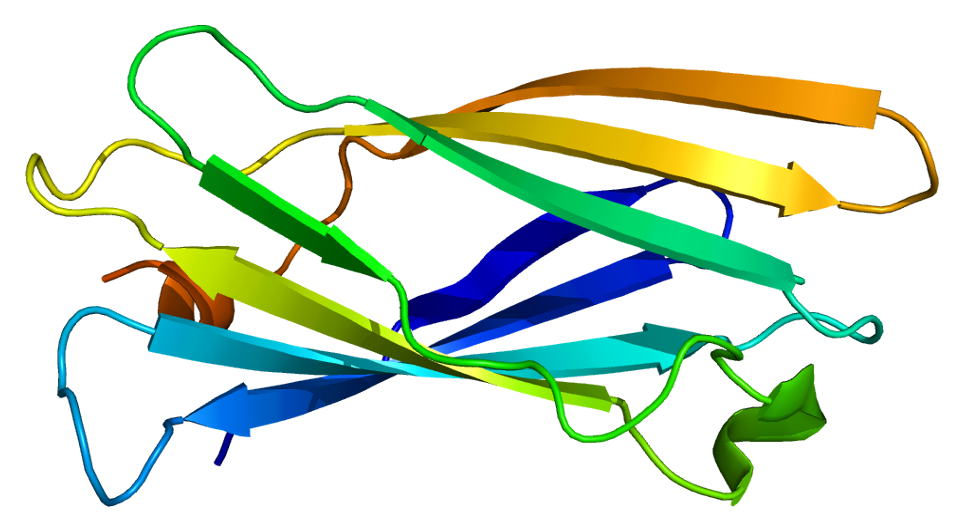

Identifiers
- Aliases: AP1G1, ADTG, CLAPG1, adaptor related protein complex 1 gamma 1 subunit, adaptor related protein complex 1 subunit gamma 1, USRISD
- External IDs: OMIM: 603533; MGI: 101919; GeneCards: AP1G1
Available structures
PDB	Ortholog search: PDBe RCSB
PDB	List of PDB id codes 1IU1

Gene location (Human)
Chr.	Chromosome 16 (human)
Band	16q22.2	Start	71,729,000 bp
Band	16q22.2	End	71,809,201 bp

Gene location (Mouse)
Chr.	Chromosome 8 (mouse)
Band	8 D3|8 57.26 cM	Start	110,505,186 bp
Band	8 D3|8 57.26 cM	End	110,590,836 bp
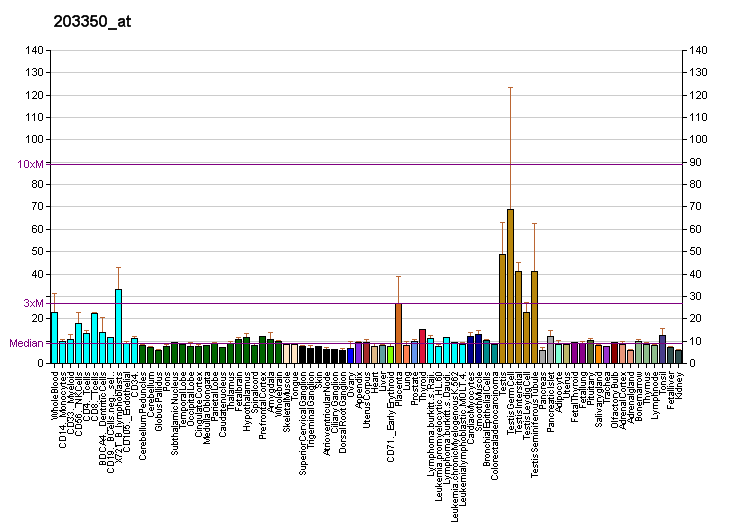
RNA expression pattern
Bgee	Human / Mouse (ortholog); Top expressed in: buccal mucosa cell; Achilles tendon; epithelium of colon; sperm; corpus epididymis; islet of Langerhans; sural nerve; left testis; middle temporal gyrus; right testis / Top expressed in: genital tubercle; tail of embryo; cumulus cell; granulocyte; neural layer of retina; dentate gyrus of hippocampal formation granule cell; Paneth cell; ventricular zone; spermatocyte; right kidney; More reference expression data
BioGPS	More reference expression data
Gene ontology
Molecular function	transporter activity; GTP-dependent protein binding; protein binding; kinesin binding
Cellular component	recycling endosome; clathrin-coated endocytic vesicle membrane; Golgi apparatus; trans-Golgi network membrane; membrane; intracellular membrane-bounded organelle; Golgi membrane; lysosomal membrane; AP-type membrane coat adaptor complex; clathrin-coated vesicle membrane; membrane coat; cytoplasmic vesicle membrane; cytoplasmic vesicle; clathrin-coated vesicle; clathrin adaptor complex; cytoplasm; cytosol; AP-1 adaptor complex
Biological process	antigen processing and presentation of exogenous peptide antigen via MHC class II; mitigation of host defenses by virus; Golgi to lysosome transport; positive regulation of natural killer cell degranulation; melanosome organization; endosome to melanosome transport; protein transport; intracellular protein transport; positive regulation of natural killer cell mediated cytotoxicity; vesicle-mediated transport; transport
Sources:Amigo / QuickGO
Orthologs
Databases	NCBI: entry; OMA: entry
Species	Human	Mouse
Entrez	164	11765
Ensembl	ENSG00000166747	ENSMUSG00000031731
UniProt	O43747	P22892
RefSeq (mRNA)	NM_001128; NM_001030007	NM_001301211; NM_009677
RefSeq (protein)	NP_001025178; NP_001119	NP_001288140; NP_033807
Location (UCSC)	Chr 16: 71.73 – 71.81 Mb	Chr 8: 110.51 – 110.59 Mb
PubMed search
- Wikidata
View/Edit Human	View/Edit Mouse

AP-1 complex subunit gamma-1 is a protein that in humans is encoded by the AP1G1 gene.

== Function ==
Adaptins are important components of clathrin-coated vesicles transporting ligand-receptor complexes from the plasma membrane or from the trans-Golgi network to lysosomes. The adaptin family of proteins is composed of four classes of molecules named alpha, beta-, beta prime- and gamma- adaptins. Adaptins, together with medium and small subunits, form a heterotetrameric complex called an adaptor, whose role is to promote the formation of clathrin-coated pits and vesicles. The protein encoded by this gene is a gamma-adaptin protein and it belongs to the adaptor complexes large subunits family. Two transcript variants encoding different isoforms have been found for this gene.

== Interactions ==
AP1G1 has been shown to interact with:

- AP1B1,
- AP1GBP1,
- AP1M1,
- AP1S1,
- NECAP2,
- RABEP1, and
- Synaptophysin.
