= AP1G2 =

Protein-coding gene in the species Homo sapiens

Identifiers
- Aliases: AP1G2, G2AD, adaptor related protein complex 1 gamma 2 subunit, adaptor related protein complex 1 subunit gamma 2
- External IDs: OMIM: 603534; MGI: 1328307; GeneCards: AP1G2
Available structures
PDB	Ortholog search: PDBe RCSB
PDB	List of PDB id codes 2E9G, 2YMT, 3ZHF, 4BCX

Gene location (Human)
Chr.	Chromosome 14 (human)
Band	14q11.2	Start	23,559,565 bp
Band	14q11.2	End	23,568,070 bp

Gene location (Mouse)
Chr.	Chromosome 14 (mouse)
Band	14|14 C3	Start	55,336,032 bp
Band	14|14 C3	End	55,344,050 bp
RNA expression pattern
Bgee	Human / Mouse (ortholog); Top expressed in: right hemisphere of cerebellum; granulocyte; anterior pituitary; right uterine tube; right lobe of thyroid gland; left lobe of thyroid gland; right frontal lobe; left ovary; right ovary; mucosa of transverse colon / Top expressed in: duodenum; yolk sac; granulocyte; jejunum; otic vesicle; lip; ileum; crypt of lieberkuhn of small intestine; otic placode; thymus; More reference expression data
BioGPS	n/a
Gene ontology
Molecular function	protein binding
Cellular component	Golgi-associated vesicle; membrane coat; Golgi membrane; endosome; Golgi apparatus; endosome membrane; transport vesicle; membrane; cytoplasmic vesicle membrane; cytoplasmic vesicle; clathrin adaptor complex; AP-1 adaptor complex
Biological process	protein transport; intracellular protein transport; viral process; vesicle-mediated transport
Sources:Amigo / QuickGO
Orthologs
Databases	NCBI: entry; OMA: entry
Species	Human	Mouse
Entrez	8906	11766
Ensembl	ENSG00000213983	ENSMUSG00000040701
UniProt	O75843	O88512
RefSeq (mRNA)	NM_001282474; NM_001282475; NM_003917; NM_080545; NM_001354673 NM_001354674; NM_001354675; NM_001354677; NM_001354681	NM_007455; NM_001303502
RefSeq (protein)	NP_001269403; NP_001269404; NP_003908; NP_001341602; NP_001341603 NP_001341604; NP_001341606; NP_001341610	NP_001290431; NP_031481
Location (UCSC)	Chr 14: 23.56 – 23.57 Mb	Chr 14: 55.34 – 55.34 Mb
PubMed search
- Wikidata
View/Edit Human	View/Edit Mouse

AP-1 complex subunit gamma-like 2 is a protein that in humans is encoded by the AP1G2 gene.

Adaptins are important components of clathrin-coated vesicles transporting ligand-receptor complexes from the plasma membrane or from the trans-Golgi network to lysosomes. The adaptin family of proteins is composed of four classes of molecules named alpha, beta-, beta prime- and gamma- adaptins. Adaptins, together with medium and small subunits, form a heterotetrameric complex called an adaptor, whose role is to promote the formation of clathrin-coated pits and vesicles. The protein encoded by this gene is a gamma-adaptin protein and it belongs to the adaptor complexes large subunits family. This protein along with the complex is thought to function at some trafficking step in the complex pathways between the trans-Golgi network and the cell surface. There are two alternatively spliced transcript variants of this gene encoding the same protein.

== Interactions ==
AP1G2 has been shown to interact with NEDD4.
