= AP2B1 =

Protein-coding gene in the species Homo sapiens

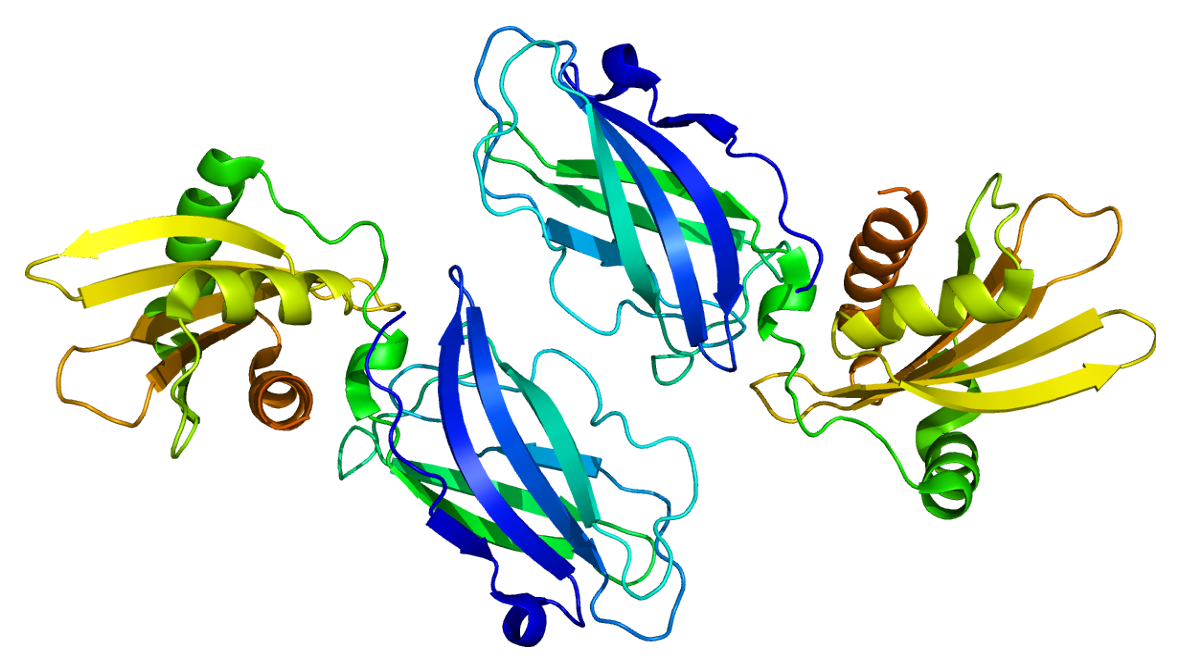

Identifiers
- Aliases: AP2B1, ADTB2, AP105B, AP2-BETA, CLAPB1, adaptor related protein complex 2 beta 1 subunit, adaptor related protein complex 2 subunit beta 1
- External IDs: OMIM: 601025; MGI: 1919020; GeneCards: AP2B1
Available structures
PDB	Ortholog search: PDBe RCSB
PDB	List of PDB id codes 1E42, 2G30, 2IV8, 2IV9, 2JKR, 2JKT, 2VGL, 2XA7, 4UQI

Gene location (Human)
Chr.	Chromosome 17 (human)
Band	17q12	Start	35,578,046 bp
Band	17q12	End	35,726,413 bp

Gene location (Mouse)
Chr.	Chromosome 11 (mouse)
Band	11|11 C	Start	83,189,850 bp
Band	11|11 C	End	83,295,861 bp
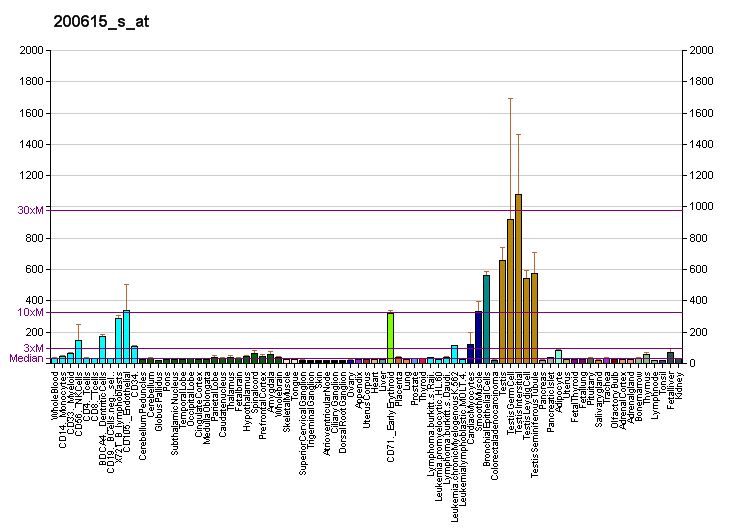
RNA expression pattern
Bgee	Human / Mouse (ortholog); Top expressed in: ganglionic eminence; ventricular zone; Brodmann area 10; islet of Langerhans; stromal cell of endometrium; rectum; right frontal lobe; cingulate gyrus; anterior cingulate cortex; C1 segment / Top expressed in: spermatid; seminiferous tubule; spermatocyte; dentate gyrus of hippocampal formation granule cell; superior frontal gyrus; lateral septal nucleus; tail of embryo; cerebellar cortex; somite; subiculum; More reference expression data
BioGPS	More reference expression data
Gene ontology
Molecular function	clathrin adaptor activity; protein-containing complex binding; clathrin binding; signal sequence binding; protein binding; cargo receptor activity
Cellular component	endocytic vesicle membrane; cytosol; clathrin-coated endocytic vesicle membrane; membrane; clathrin coat; plasma membrane; trans-Golgi network; endolysosome membrane; membrane coat; clathrin-coated pit; clathrin adaptor complex; AP-2 adaptor complex; clathrin-coated endocytic vesicle; postsynapse; glutamatergic synapse
Biological process	cardiac septum development; endocytosis; ventricular septum development; antigen processing and presentation of exogenous peptide antigen via MHC class II; ephrin receptor signaling pathway; mitigation of host defenses by virus; coronary vasculature development; aorta development; development of the heart; clathrin-dependent endocytosis; clathrin coat assembly; protein transport; intracellular protein transport; vesicle-mediated transport; microtubule-based movement; Wnt signaling pathway, planar cell polarity pathway; membrane organization; neurotransmitter receptor internalization; low-density lipoprotein particle receptor catabolic process; low-density lipoprotein particle clearance; transport; positive regulation of endocytosis; postsynaptic neurotransmitter receptor internalization; negative regulation of neuron death; positive regulation of protein localization to membrane
Sources:Amigo / QuickGO
Orthologs
Databases	NCBI: entry; OMA: entry
Species	Human	Mouse
Entrez	163	71770
Ensembl	ENSG00000006125	ENSMUSG00000035152
UniProt	P63010	Q9DBG3
RefSeq (mRNA)	NM_001030006; NM_001282	NM_001035854; NM_027915
RefSeq (protein)	NP_001025177; NP_001273	NP_001030931; NP_082191
Location (UCSC)	Chr 17: 35.58 – 35.73 Mb	Chr 11: 83.19 – 83.3 Mb
PubMed search
- Wikidata
View/Edit Human	View/Edit Mouse

AP-2 complex subunit beta is a protein that in humans is encoded by the AP2B1 gene.

== Function ==
The protein encoded by this gene is one of two large chain components of the AP2 adaptor complex, which serves to link clathrin to receptors in coated vesicles. The encoded protein is found on the cytoplasmic face of coated vesicles in the plasma membrane. Two transcript variants encoding different isoforms have been found for this gene.

== Interactions ==
AP2B1 has been shown to interact with:

- AP1M2,
- Arrestin beta 2,
- BUB1B,
- LDLRAP1 and
- TGF beta receptor 2.
