= AP1S1 =

Protein-coding gene in the species Homo sapiens

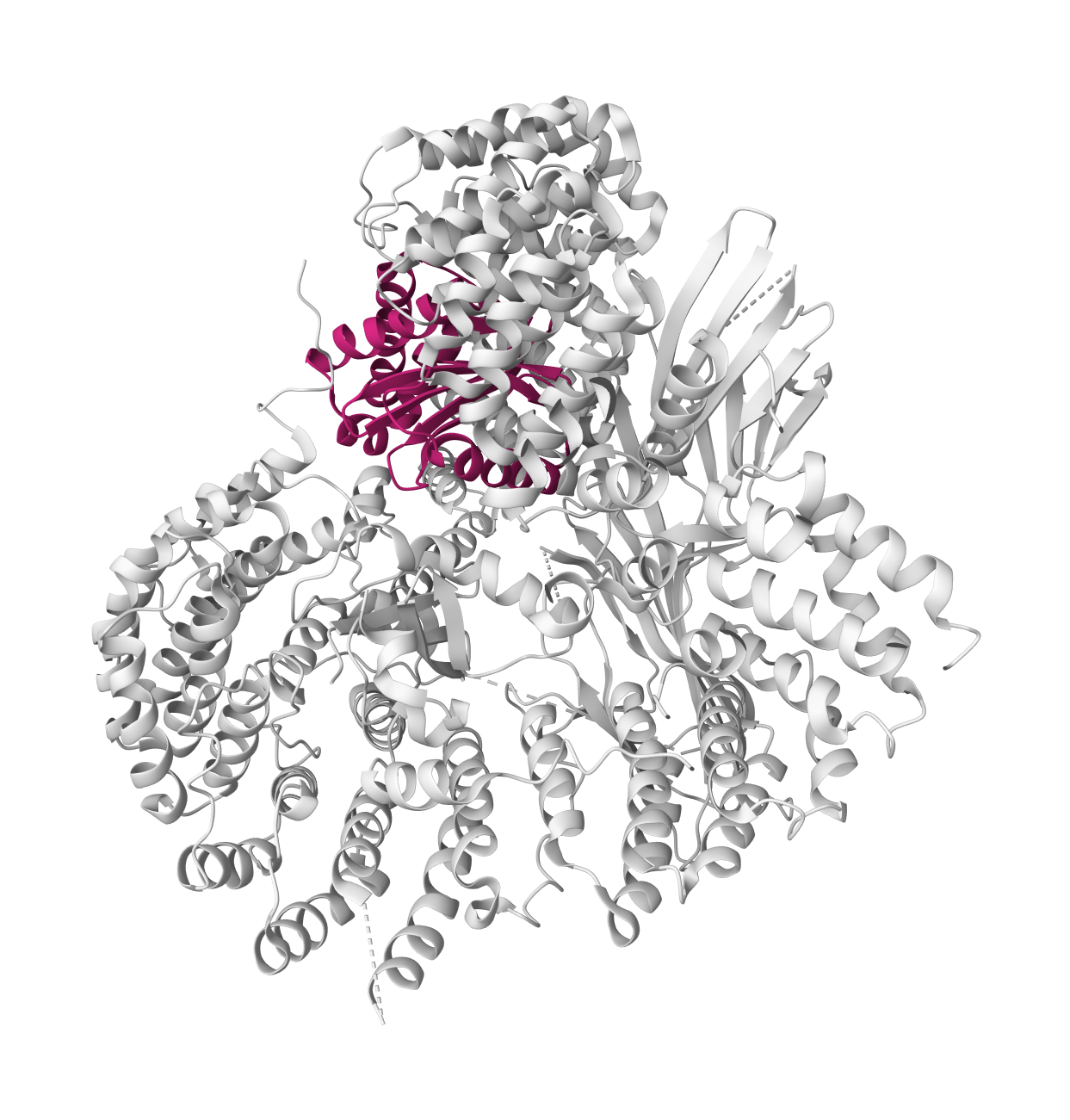

Identifiers
- Aliases: AP1S1, AP19, CLAPS1, EKV3, MEDNIK, SIGMA1A, WUGSC:H_DJ0747G18.2, adaptor related protein complex 1 sigma 1 subunit, adaptor related protein complex 1 subunit sigma 1
- External IDs: OMIM: 603531; MGI: 1098244; GeneCards: AP1S1
Available structures
PDB	Ortholog search: PDBe RCSB
PDB	List of PDB id codes 4P6Z, 1W63

Gene location (Human)
Chr.	Chromosome 7 (human)
Band	7q22.1	Start	101,154,456 bp
Band	7q22.1	End	101,161,596 bp

Gene location (Mouse)
Chr.	Chromosome 5 (mouse)
Band	5|5 G2	Start	137,063,847 bp
Band	5|5 G2	End	137,074,989 bp
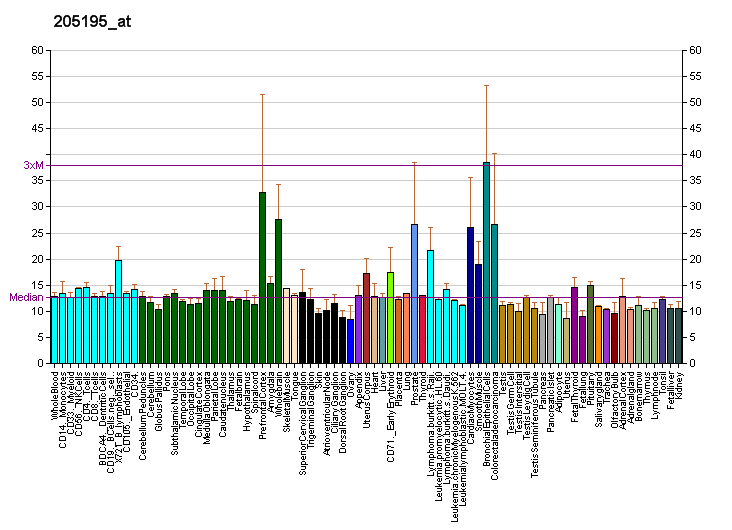

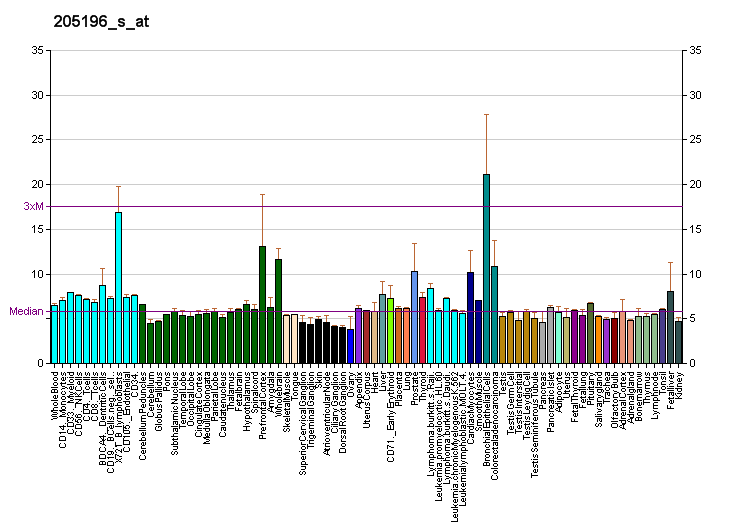

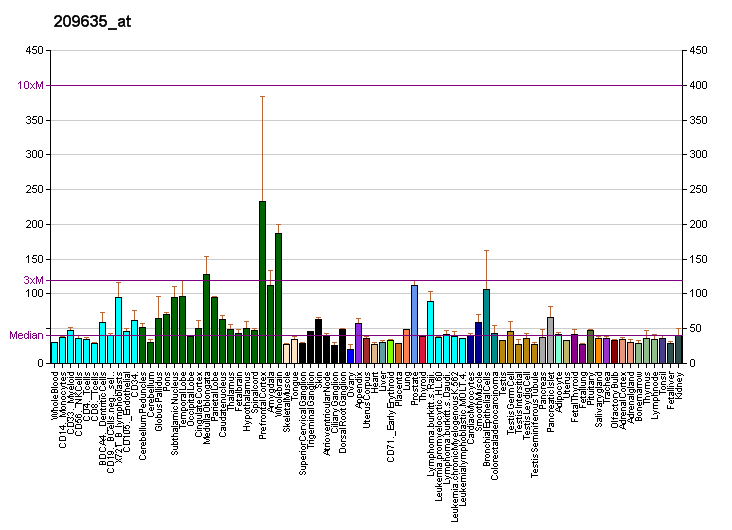
RNA expression pattern
Bgee	Human / Mouse (ortholog); Top expressed in: mucosa of transverse colon; stromal cell of endometrium; prefrontal cortex; nucleus accumbens; right frontal lobe; islet of Langerhans; caudate nucleus; putamen; Brodmann area 9; amygdala / Top expressed in: dentate gyrus of hippocampal formation granule cell; entorhinal cortex; superior frontal gyrus; perirhinal cortex; CA3 field; primary visual cortex; olfactory tubercle; yolk sac; nucleus accumbens; lip; More reference expression data
BioGPS	More reference expression data
Orthologs
Databases	NCBI: entry; OMA: entry
Species	Human	Mouse
Entrez	1174	11769
Ensembl	ENSG00000106367	ENSMUSG00000004849
UniProt	P61966	P61967
RefSeq (mRNA)	NM_057089; NM_001283	NM_007457
RefSeq (protein)	NP_001274	NP_031483
Location (UCSC)	Chr 7: 101.15 – 101.16 Mb	Chr 5: 137.06 – 137.07 Mb
PubMed search
- Wikidata
View/Edit Human	View/Edit Mouse

AP-1 complex subunit sigma-1A is a protein that in humans is encoded by the AP1S1 gene.

== Function ==
The protein encoded by this gene is part of the clathrin coat assembly complex which links clathrin to receptors in coated vesicles. These vesicles are involved in endocytosis and Golgi processing. This protein, as well as beta-prime-adaptin, gamma-adaptin, and the medium (mu) chain AP47, form the AP-1 assembly protein complex located at the Golgi vesicle. Two alternatively spliced transcript variants of this gene, which encode distinct isoforms, have been reported.

A mutation in the AP1S1 causes the rare familial MEDNIK syndrome described in 2008.

== Interactions ==
AP1S1 has been shown to interact with AP1G1 and RAB10.
