= AP1M2 =

Protein-coding gene in the species Homo sapiens

Identifiers
- Aliases: AP1M2, AP1-mu2, HSMU1B, MU-1B, MU1B, mu2, adaptor related protein complex 1 mu 2 subunit, adaptor related protein complex 1 subunit mu 2
- External IDs: OMIM: 607309; MGI: 1336974; GeneCards: AP1M2

Gene location (Human)
| Chr. | Chromosome 19 (human) |
| Band | 19p13.2 | Start | 10,572,671 bp |
| Band | 19p13.2 | End | 10,587,315 bp |

Gene location (Mouse)
| Chr. | Chromosome 9 (mouse) |
| Band | 9 A3|9 7.76 cM | Start | 21,205,571 bp |
| Band | 9 A3|9 7.76 cM | End | 21,223,633 bp |
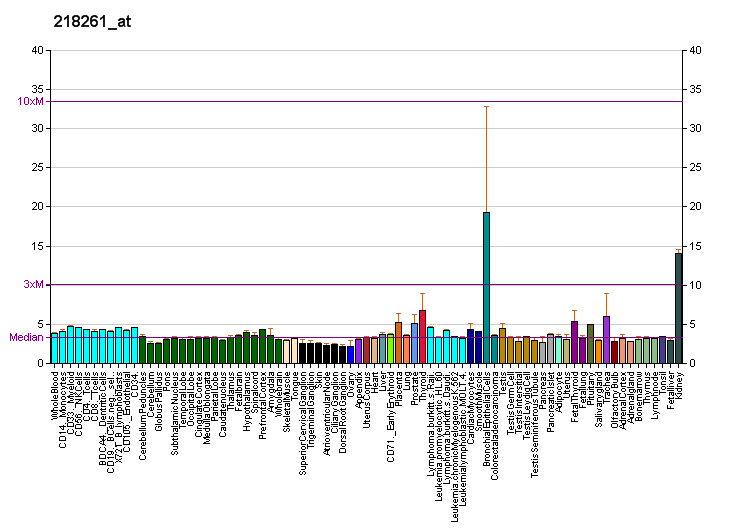

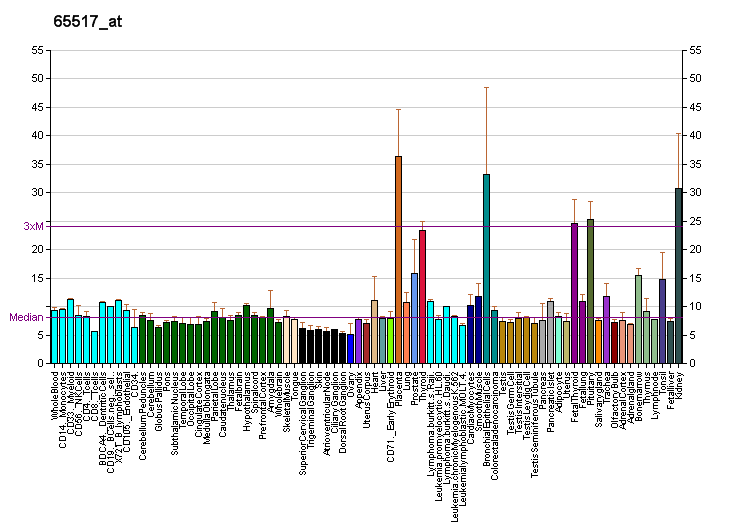
RNA expression pattern
| Bgee | Human / Mouse (ortholog); Top expressed in: mucosa of transverse colon; rectum; olfactory zone of nasal mucosa; right lobe of thyroid gland; oocyte; right uterine tube; left lobe of thyroid gland; islet of Langerhans; body of pancreas; human kidney / Top expressed in: pyloric antrum; transitional epithelium of urinary bladder; ileum; epithelium of stomach; upper respiratory tract; olfactory system; nasal epithelium; olfactory epithelium; submandibular gland; lip; More reference expression data |
| BioGPS | More reference expression data |
Gene ontology
| Molecular function | protein binding |
| Cellular component | cytosol; Golgi apparatus; trans-Golgi network membrane; intracellular membrane-bounded organelle; membrane; Golgi membrane; lysosomal membrane; clathrin-coated vesicle membrane; cytoplasmic vesicle membrane; cytoplasmic vesicle; clathrin adaptor complex |
| Biological process | protein targeting; vesicle targeting; antigen processing and presentation of exogenous peptide antigen via MHC class II; mitigation of host defenses by virus; protein transport; intracellular protein transport; vesicle-mediated transport |
Sources:Amigo / QuickGO
Orthologs
| Databases | NCBI: entry; OMA: entry |
| Species | Human | Mouse |
| Entrez | 10053 | 11768 |
| Ensembl | ENSG00000129354 | ENSMUSG00000003309 |
| UniProt | Q9Y6Q5 | Q9WVP1 |
| RefSeq (mRNA) | NM_001300887; NM_005498 | NM_001110300; NM_009678 |
| RefSeq (protein) | NP_001287816; NP_005489 | NP_001103770; NP_033808 |
| Location (UCSC) | Chr 19: 10.57 – 10.59 Mb | Chr 9: 21.21 – 21.22 Mb |
| PubMed search |
- Wikidata
| View/Edit Human | View/Edit Mouse |

AP-1 complex subunit mu-2 is a protein that in humans is encoded by the AP1M2 gene.

== Function ==
This gene encodes a subunit of the heterotetrameric adaptor-related protein complex 1 (AP-1), which belongs to the adaptor complexes medium subunits family. This protein is capable of interacting with tyrosine-based sorting signals.

== Interactions ==
AP1M2 has been shown to interact with AP2B1.
