= SPG11 =

Identifiers
- Aliases: SPG11, KIAA1840, ALS5, CMT2X, spastic paraplegia 11 (autosomal recessive), spatacsin vesicle trafficking associated, SPG11 vesicle trafficking associated, spatacsin
- External IDs: OMIM: 610844; MGI: 2444989; GeneCards: SPG11

Gene location (Human)
Chr.	Chromosome 15 (human)
Band	15q21.1	Start	44,554,818 bp
Band	15q21.1	End	44,663,688 bp

Gene location (Mouse)
Chr.	Chromosome 2 (mouse)
Band	2|2 E5	Start	121,884,001 bp
Band	2|2 E5	End	121,948,867 bp
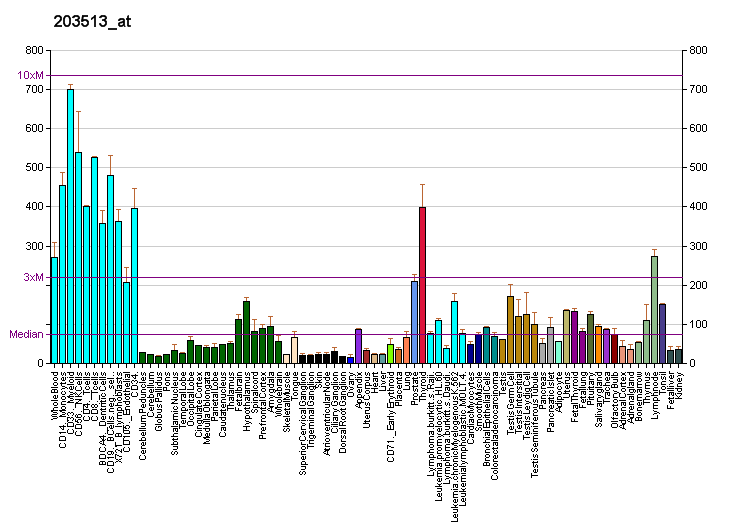

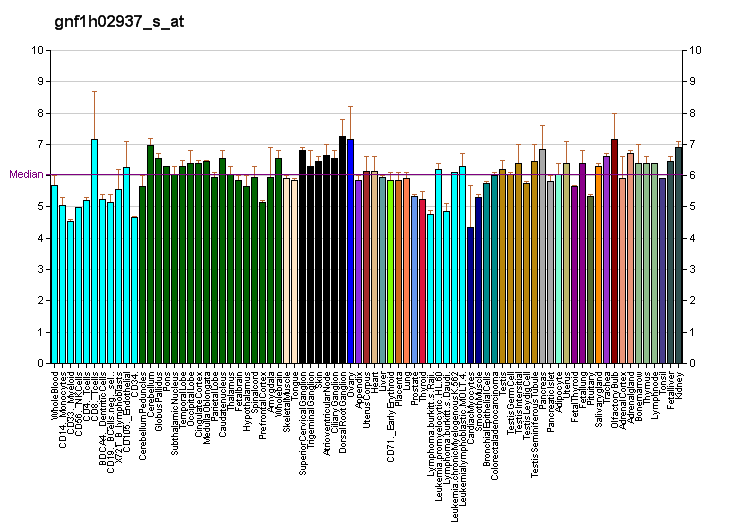

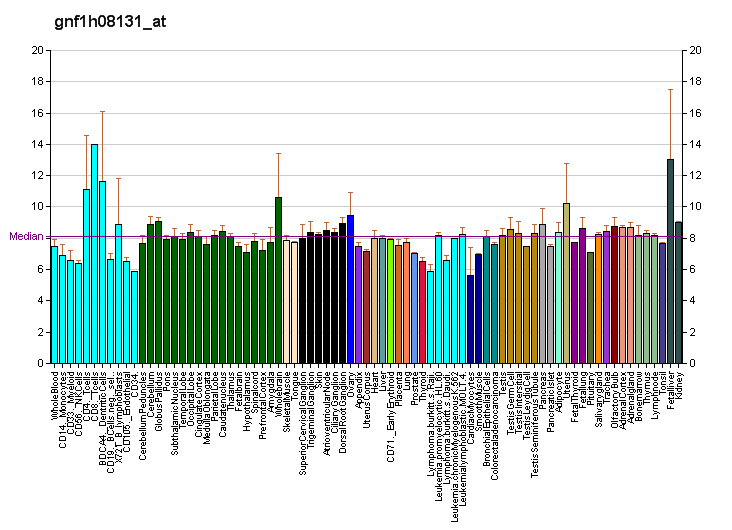
RNA expression pattern
Bgee	Human / Mouse (ortholog); Top expressed in: bronchial epithelial cell; granulocyte; Achilles tendon; epithelium of nasopharynx; skin of thigh; epithelium of colon; corpus callosum; pylorus; spleen; right lobe of thyroid gland / Top expressed in: granulocyte; spermatocyte; ascending aorta; tail of embryo; genital tubercle; aortic valve; ventricular zone; spermatid; yolk sac; lip; More reference expression data
BioGPS	More reference expression data
Gene ontology
Molecular function	protein binding
Cellular component	cytoplasm; axon; lysosomal membrane; plasma membrane; dendrite; nucleolus; extracellular exosome; cytoplasmic vesicle; nucleus; cell projection; synapse; cytosol
Biological process	axon extension; chemical synaptic transmission; synaptic vesicle transport; axo-dendritic transport; lysosome organization; phagosome-lysosome fusion involved in apoptotic cell clearance; walking behavior
Sources:Amigo / QuickGO
Orthologs
Databases	NCBI: entry; OMA: entry
Species	Human	Mouse
Entrez	80208	214585
Ensembl	ENSG00000104133	ENSMUSG00000033396
UniProt	Q96JI7	Q3UHA3
RefSeq (mRNA)	NM_001160227; NM_025137	NM_145531; NM_172533
RefSeq (protein)	NP_001153699; NP_079413	NP_663506
Location (UCSC)	Chr 15: 44.55 – 44.66 Mb	Chr 2: 121.88 – 121.95 Mb
PubMed search
- Wikidata
View/Edit Human	View/Edit Mouse

Spatacsin is a protein that in humans is encoded by the SPG11 gene.

== Function ==
Spatacsin, in combination with the SPG15 protein, attaches the AP5 adaptor complex to the outside of late Endosomes or Lysosomes when the protein via which it binds is in a particular state.

== Pathology ==
Mutations of the SPG11 gene cause a rare form of spastic paraplegia, spastic paraplegia type 11.
