= AP3B2 =

Protein-coding gene in the species Homo sapiens

Identifiers
- Aliases: AP3B2, NAPTB, adaptor related protein complex 3 beta 2 subunit, EIEE48, adaptor related protein complex 3 subunit beta 2, DEE48
- External IDs: OMIM: 602166; MGI: 1100869; GeneCards: AP3B2

Gene location (Mouse)
Chr.	Chromosome 7 (mouse)
Band	7 D3|7 45.71 cM	Start	81,110,147 bp
Band	7 D3|7 45.71 cM	End	81,143,673 bp
RNA expression pattern
Bgee	Human / Mouse (ortholog); Top expressed in: anterior pituitary; Brodmann area 10; Brodmann area 9; cingulate gyrus; ganglionic eminence; amygdala; nucleus accumbens; hypothalamus; Region I of hippocampus proper; superior frontal gyrus / Top expressed in: dentate gyrus of hippocampal formation granule cell; neural layer of retina; visual cortex; primary visual cortex; superior frontal gyrus; cerebellar cortex; supraoptic nucleus; dorsomedial hypothalamic nucleus; central gray substance of midbrain; facial motor nucleus; More reference expression data
BioGPS	n/a
Gene ontology
Molecular function	transporter activity
Cellular component	AP-3 adaptor complex; membrane coat; cytoplasmic vesicle; clathrin-coated vesicle membrane; membrane; COPI-coated vesicle; axon cytoplasm; Golgi apparatus; intracellular vesicle
Biological process	anterograde axonal transport; protein transport; anterograde synaptic vesicle transport; intracellular protein transport; vesicle-mediated transport; post-Golgi vesicle-mediated transport
Sources:Amigo / QuickGO
Orthologs
Databases	NCBI: entry
Species	Human	Mouse
Entrez	8120	11775
Ensembl	n/a	ENSMUSG00000062444
UniProt	Q13367	Q9JME5
RefSeq (mRNA)	NM_001278511; NM_001278512; NM_004644; NM_001348440; NM_001348441	NM_021492; NM_146192
RefSeq (protein)	NP_001265440; NP_001265441; NP_004635; NP_001335369; NP_001335370	NP_067467
Location (UCSC)	n/a	Chr 7: 81.11 – 81.14 Mb
PubMed search
- Wikidata
View/Edit Human	View/Edit Mouse

AP-3 complex subunit beta-2 is a protein that in humans is encoded by the AP3B2 gene.
