= AP3B1 =

Protein-coding gene in the species Homo sapiens

Identifiers
- Aliases: AP3B1, ADTB3, ADTB3A, HPS, HPS2, PE, adaptor related protein complex 3 beta 1 subunit, adaptor related protein complex 3 subunit beta 1
- External IDs: OMIM: 603401; MGI: 1333879; GeneCards: AP3B1

Gene location (Human)
| Chr. | Chromosome 5 (human) |
| Band | 5q14.1 | Start | 78,000,522 bp |
| Band | 5q14.1 | End | 78,294,762 bp |

Gene location (Mouse)
| Chr. | Chromosome 13 (mouse) |
| Band | 13 C3|13 49.22 cM | Start | 94,495,468 bp |
| Band | 13 C3|13 49.22 cM | End | 94,702,825 bp |
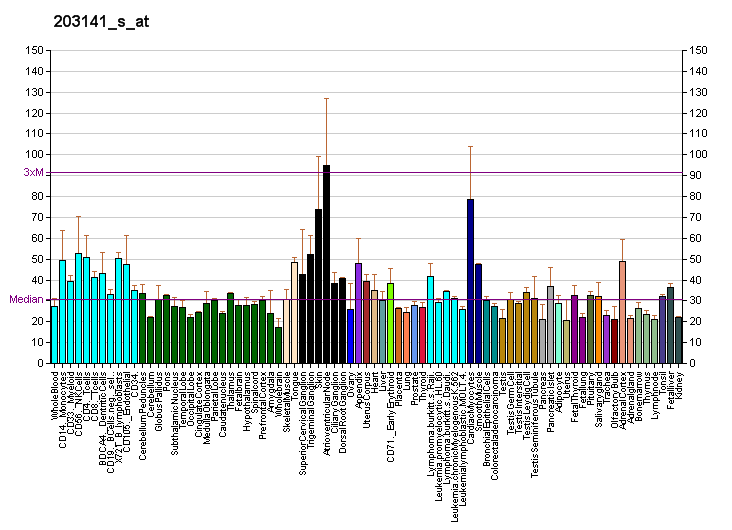

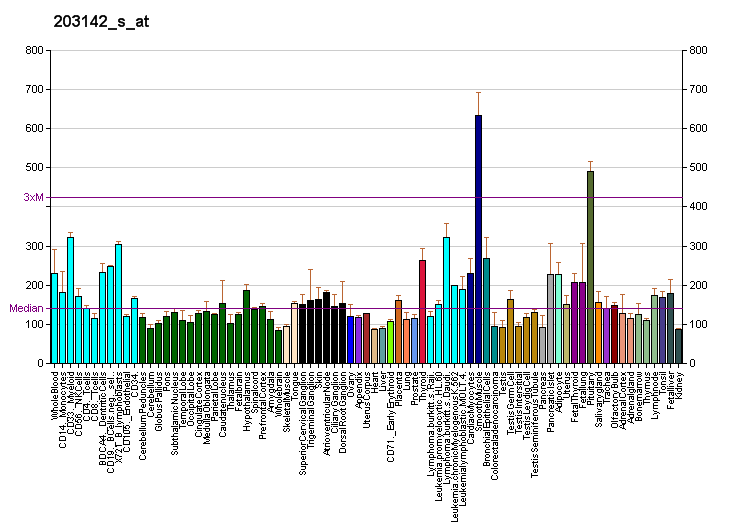
RNA expression pattern
| Bgee | Human / Mouse (ortholog); Top expressed in: tendon of biceps brachii; Achilles tendon; islet of Langerhans; anterior pituitary; monocyte; rectum; stromal cell of endometrium; beta cell; mucosa of transverse colon; smooth muscle tissue / Top expressed in: choroid plexus of fourth ventricle; Ileal epithelium; genital tubercle; transitional epithelium of urinary bladder; seminiferous tubule; secondary oocyte; tail of embryo; perirhinal cortex; entorhinal cortex; lactiferous gland; More reference expression data |
| BioGPS | More reference expression data |
Gene ontology
| Molecular function | protein phosphatase binding; GTP-dependent protein binding; protein binding |
| Cellular component | clathrin-coated vesicle membrane; lysosomal membrane; membrane coat; cytoplasmic vesicle; AP-3 adaptor complex; Golgi apparatus; membrane; clathrin adaptor complex; axon cytoplasm; synapse; postsynapse |
| Biological process | protein targeting to lysosome; protein transport; intracellular protein transport; antigen processing and presentation, exogenous lipid antigen via MHC class Ib; vesicle-mediated transport; melanosome organization; positive regulation of NK T cell differentiation; antigen processing and presentation; blood coagulation; anterograde axonal transport; anterograde synaptic vesicle transport; transport; synaptic vesicle budding from endosome |
Sources:Amigo / QuickGO
Orthologs
| Databases | NCBI: entry; OMA: entry |
| Species | Human | Mouse |
| Entrez | 8546 | 11774 |
| Ensembl | ENSG00000132842 | ENSMUSG00000021686 |
| UniProt | O00203 | Q9Z1T1 |
| RefSeq (mRNA) | NM_001271769; NM_003664 | NM_009680 |
| RefSeq (protein) | NP_001258698; NP_003655 | NP_033810 |
| Location (UCSC) | Chr 5: 78 – 78.29 Mb | Chr 13: 94.5 – 94.7 Mb |
| PubMed search |
- Wikidata
| View/Edit Human | View/Edit Mouse |

AP-3 complex subunit beta-1 is a protein that in humans is encoded by the AP3B1 gene.

== Function ==
This gene encodes a protein that may play a role in organelle biogenesis associated with melanosomes, platelet dense granules, and lysosomes. The encoded protein is part of the heterotetrameric AP-3 protein complex which interacts with the scaffolding protein clathrin. Mutations in this gene are associated with Hermansky–Pudlak syndrome type 2.

== Interactions ==
AP3B1 has been shown to interact with AP3S2.
