= AP3S2 =

Protein-coding gene in humans

Identifiers
- Aliases: AP3S2, AP3S3, sigma3b, adaptor related protein complex 3 sigma 2 subunit, adaptor related protein complex 3 subunit sigma 2
- External IDs: OMIM: 602416; MGI: 1337060; GeneCards: AP3S2

Gene location (Human)
Chr.	Chromosome 15 (human)
Band	15q26.1	Start	89,830,599 bp
Band	15q26.1	End	89,894,638 bp

Gene location (Mouse)
Chr.	Chromosome 7 (mouse)
Band	7|7 D2	Start	79,525,073 bp
Band	7|7 D2	End	79,570,397 bp
RNA expression pattern
Bgee	Human / Mouse (ortholog); Top expressed in: rectum; islet of Langerhans; monocyte; epithelium of colon; muscle of leg; gastrocnemius muscle; ventricular zone; muscle of thigh; Achilles tendon; ganglionic eminence / Top expressed in: tail of embryo; ventricular zone; genital tubercle; neural layer of retina; epiblast; dentate gyrus of hippocampal formation granule cell; neural tube; external carotid artery; facial motor nucleus; internal carotid artery; More reference expression data
BioGPS	n/a
Orthologs
Databases	NCBI: entry; OMA: entry
Species	Human	Mouse
Entrez	10239	11778
Ensembl	ENSG00000157823	ENSMUSG00000063801
UniProt	P59780	Q8BSZ2
RefSeq (mRNA)	NM_005829	NM_009682
RefSeq (protein)	NP_005820	NP_033812
Location (UCSC)	Chr 15: 89.83 – 89.89 Mb	Chr 7: 79.53 – 79.57 Mb
PubMed search
- Wikidata
View/Edit Human	View/Edit Mouse

AP-3 complex subunit sigma-2 is a protein that in humans is encoded by the AP3S2 gene.

== Interactions ==
AP3S2 has been shown to interact with AP3B1.
