= AP5Z1 =

Protein-coding gene in the species Homo sapiens

Identifiers
- Aliases: AP5Z1, KIAA0415, SPG48, zeta, adaptor related protein complex 5 zeta 1 subunit, adaptor related protein complex 5 subunit zeta 1
- External IDs: OMIM: 613653; MGI: 1924908; GeneCards: AP5Z1

Gene location (Human)
Chr.	Chromosome 7 (human)
Band	7p22.1	Start	4,775,615 bp
Band	7p22.1	End	4,794,397 bp

Gene location (Mouse)
Chr.	Chromosome 5 (mouse)
Band	5|5 G2	Start	142,449,699 bp
Band	5|5 G2	End	142,464,465 bp
RNA expression pattern
Bgee	Human / Mouse (ortholog); Top expressed in: granulocyte; tendon of biceps brachii; buccal mucosa cell; skin of leg; right adrenal cortex; mucosa of transverse colon; spleen; left adrenal gland; left adrenal cortex; sural nerve / Top expressed in: otic vesicle; granulocyte; yolk sac; Rostral migratory stream; Paneth cell; lumbar subsegment of spinal cord; calvaria; right kidney; fossa; mesenteric lymph nodes; More reference expression data
BioGPS	n/a
Gene ontology
Molecular function	protein binding
Cellular component	cytoplasm; AP-5 adaptor complex; AP-type membrane coat adaptor complex; nucleus; nucleoplasm; nuclear speck
Biological process	protein transport; endosomal transport; double-strand break repair via homologous recombination; DNA repair; cellular response to DNA damage stimulus
Sources:Amigo / QuickGO
Orthologs
Databases	NCBI: entry; OMA: entry
Species	Human	Mouse
Entrez	9907	231855
Ensembl	ENSG00000242802	ENSMUSG00000039623
UniProt	O43299	Q3U829
RefSeq (mRNA)	NM_014855; NM_001364858	NM_172725
RefSeq (protein)	NP_055670; NP_001351787	NP_766313
Location (UCSC)	Chr 7: 4.78 – 4.79 Mb	Chr 5: 142.45 – 142.46 Mb
PubMed search
- Wikidata
View/Edit Human	View/Edit Mouse

AP-5 complex subunit zeta (AP5Z1) is a protein that in humans is encoded by the AP5Z1 gene.

== Function ==
The protein encoded by this gene is one of two large subunits of the AP5 adaptor complex. Damaging variants in this gene are associated with SPG48, a type of hereditary spastic paraplegia.
