= AP3M1 =

Protein-coding gene in humans

Identifiers
- Aliases: AP3M1, adaptor related protein complex 3 mu 1 subunit, adaptor related protein complex 3 subunit mu 1
- External IDs: OMIM: 610366; MGI: 1929212; GeneCards: AP3M1

Gene location (Human)
Chr.	Chromosome 10 (human)
Band	10q22.2	Start	74,120,255 bp
Band	10q22.2	End	74,150,842 bp

Gene location (Mouse)
Chr.	Chromosome 14 (mouse)
Band	14 A3|14 11.58 cM	Start	21,081,510 bp
Band	14 A3|14 11.58 cM	End	21,102,576 bp
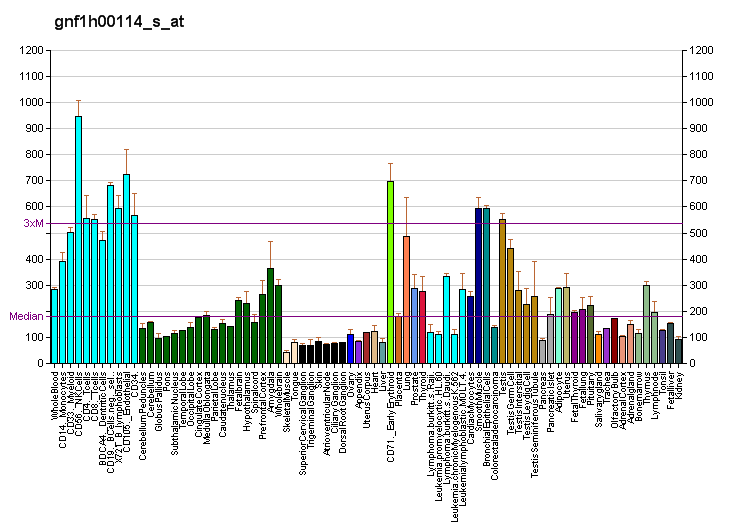

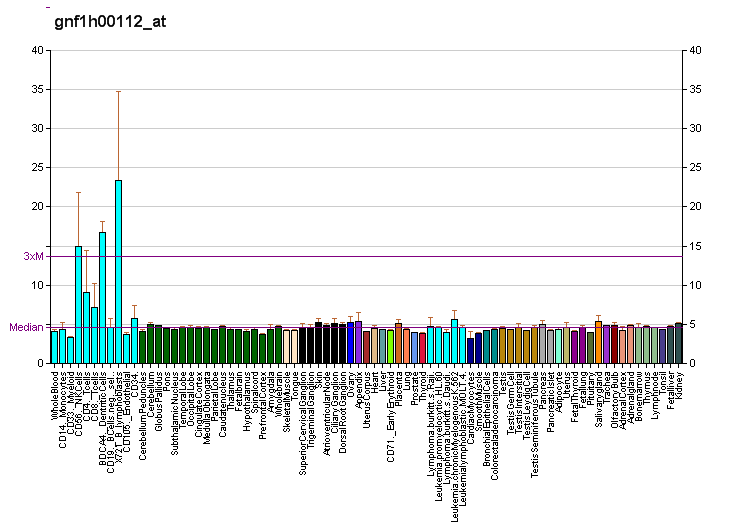
RNA expression pattern
Bgee	Human / Mouse (ortholog); Top expressed in: pancreatic ductal cell; mucosa of ileum; ganglionic eminence; ventricular zone; islet of Langerhans; smooth muscle tissue; rectum; tibialis anterior muscle; monocyte; appendix / Top expressed in: ventricular zone; secondary oocyte; spermatocyte; genital tubercle; zygote; tail of embryo; spermatid; atrioventricular junction; granulocyte; lens; More reference expression data
BioGPS	More reference expression data
Gene ontology
Molecular function	protein binding
Cellular component	lysosomal membrane; Golgi apparatus; lysosome; cytoplasmic vesicle membrane; membrane; cytoplasmic vesicle; clathrin adaptor complex; axon cytoplasm
Biological process	anterograde axonal transport; protein transport; anterograde synaptic vesicle transport; protein targeting to lysosome; intracellular protein transport; vesicle-mediated transport; transport; viral process
Sources:Amigo / QuickGO
Orthologs
Databases	NCBI: entry; OMA: entry
Species	Human	Mouse
Entrez	26985	55946
Ensembl	ENSG00000185009	ENSMUSG00000021824
UniProt	Q9Y2T2	Q9JKC8
RefSeq (mRNA)	NM_012095; NM_207012; NM_001320263; NM_001320264; NM_001320265	NM_018829
RefSeq (protein)	NP_001307192; NP_001307193; NP_001307194; NP_036227; NP_996895	NP_061299
Location (UCSC)	Chr 10: 74.12 – 74.15 Mb	Chr 14: 21.08 – 21.1 Mb
PubMed search
- Wikidata
View/Edit Human	View/Edit Mouse

AP-3 complex subunit mu-1 is a protein that in humans is encoded by the AP3M1 gene.

The protein encoded by this gene is the medium subunit of AP-3, which is an adaptor-related protein complex associated with the Golgi region as well as more peripheral intracellular structures. AP-3 facilitates the budding of vesicles from the Golgi membrane and may be directly involved in protein sorting to the endosomal/lysosomal system. AP-3 is a heterotetrameric protein complex composed of two large subunits (delta and beta3), a medium subunit (mu3), and a small subunit (sigma 3). Mutations in one of the large subunits of AP-3 have been associated with the Hermansky-Pudlak syndrome, a genetic disorder characterized by defective lysosome-related organelles. Alternatively spliced transcript variants encoding the same protein have been observed.
