= Clathrin adaptor protein =

Links clathrin to receptors in coated vesicles

Clathrin adaptor complex small chain

Identifiers
- Symbol: Clat_adaptor_s
- Pfam: PF01217
- InterPro: IPR022775
Available protein structures:
- PDB: IPR022775 PF01217 (ECOD; PDBsum)
- AlphaFold: IPR022775; PF01217

Clathrin adaptor proteins, also known as adaptins, are vesicular transport adaptor proteins associated with clathrin. The association between adaptins and clathrin are important for vesicular cargo selection and transporting. Clathrin coats contain both clathrin (acts as a scaffold) and adaptor complexes that link clathrin to receptors in coated vesicles. Clathrin-associated protein complexes are believed to interact with the cytoplasmic tails of membrane proteins, leading to their selection and concentration. Therefore, adaptor proteins are responsible for the recruitment of cargo molecules into a growing clathrin-coated pits. The two major types of clathrin adaptor complexes are the heterotetrameric vesicular transport adaptor proteins (AP1-5), and the monomeric GGA (Golgi-localising, Gamma-adaptin ear homology, ARF-binding proteins) adaptors. Adaptins are distantly related to the other main type of vesicular transport proteins, the coatomer subunits, sharing between 16% and 26% of their amino acid sequence.

Adaptor protein (AP) complexes are found in coated vesicles and clathrin-coated pits. AP complexes connect cargo proteins and lipids to clathrin at vesicle budding sites, as well as binding accessory proteins that regulate coat assembly and disassembly (such as AP180, epsins and auxilin). There are different AP complexes in mammals. AP1 is responsible for the transport of lysosomal hydrolases between the trans-Golgi network, and endosomes. AP2 adaptor complex associates with the plasma membrane and is responsible for endocytosis. AP3 is responsible for protein trafficking to lysosomes and other related organelles. AP4 is less well characterised. AP complexes are heterotetramers composed of two large subunits (adaptins), a medium subunit (mu) and a small subunit (sigma). For example, in AP1 these subunits are gamma-1-adaptin, beta-1-adaptin, mu-1 and sigma-1, while in AP2 they are alpha-adaptin, beta-2-adaptin, mu-2 and sigma-2. Each subunit has a specific function. Adaptins recognise and bind to clathrin through their hinge region (clathrin box), and recruit accessory proteins that modulate AP function through their C-terminal ear (appendage) domains. Mu recognises tyrosine-based sorting signals within the cytoplasmic domains of transmembrane cargo proteins. One function of clathrin and AP2 complex-mediated endocytosis is to regulate the number of GABA_{A} receptors available at the cell surface .

== See also ==
- List of adaptins
