= Peripheral membrane protein =

Membrane proteins that adhere temporarily to membranes with which they are associated

Peripheral membrane proteins, or extrinsic membrane proteins, are membrane proteins that adhere only temporarily to the biological membrane with which they are associated. These proteins attach to integral membrane proteins, or penetrate the peripheral regions of the lipid bilayer. The regulatory protein subunits of many ion channels and transmembrane receptors, for example, may be defined as peripheral membrane proteins. In contrast to integral membrane proteins, peripheral membrane proteins tend to collect in the water-soluble component, or fraction, of all the proteins extracted during a protein purification procedure. Proteins with GPI anchors are an exception to this rule and can have purification properties similar to those of integral membrane proteins.

The reversible attachment of proteins to biological membranes has shown to regulate cell signaling and many other important cellular events, through a variety of mechanisms. For example, the close association between many enzymes and biological membranes may bring them into close proximity with their lipid substrate(s). Membrane binding may also promote rearrangement, dissociation, or conformational changes within many protein structural domains, resulting in an activation of their biological activity. Additionally, the positioning of many proteins are localized to either the inner or outer surfaces or leaflets of their resident membrane. This facilitates the assembly of multi-protein complexes by increasing the probability of any appropriate protein–protein interactions.

Schematic representation of the different types of interaction between monotopic membrane proteins and the cell membrane: 1. interaction by an amphipathic α-helix parallel to the membrane plane (in-plane membrane helix) 2. interaction by a hydrophobic loop 3. interaction by a covalently bound membrane lipid (lipidation) 4. electrostatic or ionic interactions with membrane lipids (e.g. through a calcium ion)

== Binding to the lipid bilayer ==
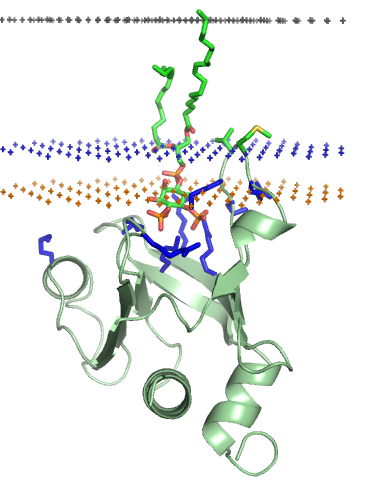
PH domain of phospholipase C delta 1. Middle plane of the lipid bilayer – black dots. Boundary of the hydrocarbon core region – blue dots (intracellular side). Layer of lipid phosphates – yellow dots.

Peripheral membrane proteins may interact with other proteins or directly with the lipid bilayer. In the latter case, they are then known as amphitropic proteins. Some proteins, such as G-proteins and certain protein kinases, interact with transmembrane proteins and the lipid bilayer simultaneously. Some polypeptide hormones, antimicrobial peptides, and neurotoxins accumulate at the membrane surface prior to locating and interacting with their cell surface receptor targets, which may themselves be peripheral membrane proteins.

The phospholipid bilayer that forms the cell surface membrane consists of a hydrophobic inner core region sandwiched between two regions of hydrophilicity, one at the inner surface and one at the outer surface of the cell membrane (see lipid bilayer article for a more detailed structural description of the cell membrane). The inner and outer surfaces, or interfacial regions, of model phospholipid bilayers have been shown to have a thickness of around 8 to 10 Å, although this may be wider in biological membranes that include large amounts of gangliosides or lipopolysaccharides. The hydrophobic inner core region of typical biological membranes may have a thickness of around 27 to 32 Å, as estimated by Small angle X-ray scattering (SAXS). The boundary region between the hydrophobic inner core and the hydrophilic interfacial regions is very narrow, at around 3 Å, (see lipid bilayer article for a description of its component chemical groups). Moving outwards away from the hydrophobic core region and into the interfacial hydrophilic region, the effective concentration of water rapidly changes across this boundary layer, from nearly zero to a concentration of around 2 M. The phosphate groups within phospholipid bilayers are fully hydrated or saturated with water and are situated around 5 Å outside the boundary of the hydrophobic core region.

Some water-soluble proteins associate with lipid bilayers irreversibly and can form transmembrane alpha-helical or beta-barrel channels. Such transformations occur in pore forming toxins such as colicin A, alpha-hemolysin, and others. They may also occur in BcL-2 like protein, in some amphiphilic antimicrobial peptides, and in certain annexins. These proteins are usually described as peripheral as one of their conformational states is water-soluble or only loosely associated with a membrane.

== Membrane binding mechanisms ==
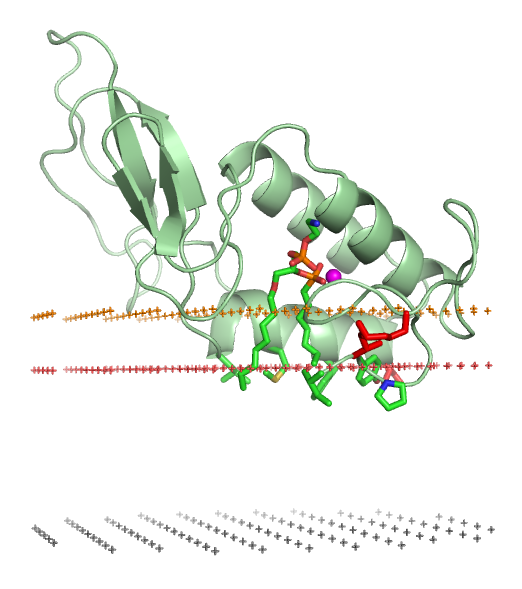
Bee venom phospholipase A2 (1poc). Middle plane of the lipid bilayer – black dots. Boundary of the hydrocarbon core region – red dots (extracellular side). Layer of lipid phosphates – yellow dots.

The association of a protein with a lipid bilayer may involve significant changes within tertiary structure of a protein. These may include the folding of regions of protein structure that were previously unfolded or a re-arrangement in the folding or a refolding of the membrane-associated part of the proteins. It also may involve the formation or dissociation of protein quaternary structures or oligomeric complexes, and specific binding of ions, ligands, or regulatory lipids.

Typical amphitropic proteins must interact strongly with the lipid bilayer in order to perform their biological functions. These include the enzymatic processing of lipids and other hydrophobic substances, membrane anchoring, and the binding and transfer of small nonpolar compounds between different cellular membranes. These proteins may be anchored to the bilayer as a result of hydrophobic interactions between the bilayer and exposed nonpolar residues at the surface of a protein, by specific non-covalent binding interactions with regulatory lipids, or through their attachment to covalently bound lipid anchors.

It has been shown that the membrane binding affinities of many peripheral proteins depend on the specific lipid composition of the membrane with which they are associated.

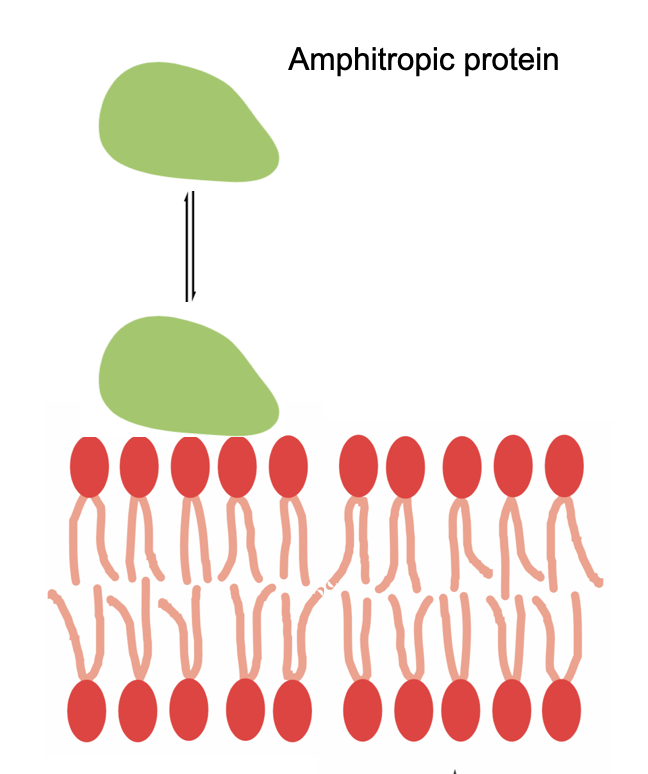
amphitropic proteins bind to hydrophobic anchor structures

=== Non-specific hydrophobic association ===
Amphitropic proteins associate with lipid bilayers via various hydrophobic anchor structures. Such as amphiphilic α-helixes, exposed nonpolar loops, post-translationally acylated or lipidated amino acid residues, or acyl chains of specifically bound regulatory lipids such as phosphatidylinositol phosphates. Hydrophobic interactions have been shown to be important even for highly cationic peptides and proteins, such as the polybasic domain of the MARCKS protein or histactophilin, when their natural hydrophobic anchors are present.

=== Covalently bound lipid anchors ===
Lipid anchored proteins are covalently attached to different fatty acid acyl chains on the cytoplasmic side of the cell membrane via palmitoylation, myristoylation, or prenylation. On the exoplasmic face of the cell membrane, lipid anchored proteins are covalently attached to the lipids glycosylphosphatidylinositol (GPI) and cholesterol. Protein association with membranes through the use of acylated residues is a reversible process, as the acyl chain can be buried in a protein's hydrophobic binding pocket after dissociation from the membrane. This process occurs within the beta-subunits of G-proteins. Perhaps because of this additional need for structural flexibility, lipid anchors are usually bound to the highly flexible segments of proteins tertiary structure that are not well resolved by protein crystallographic studies.

=== Specific protein–lipid binding ===
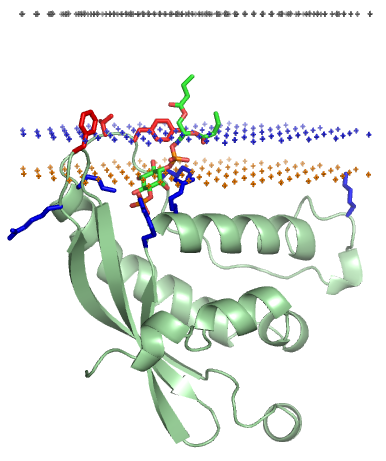
P40phox PX domain of NADPH oxidase Middle plane of the lipid bilayer – black dots. Boundary of the hydrocarbon core region – blue dots (intracellular side). Layer of lipid phosphates – yellow dots.

Some cytosolic proteins are recruited to different cellular membranes by recognizing certain types of lipid found within a given membrane. Binding of a protein to a specific lipid occurs via specific membrane-targeting structural domains that occur within the protein and have specific binding pockets for the lipid head groups of the lipids to which they bind. This is a typical biochemical protein–ligand interaction, and is stabilized by the formation of intermolecular hydrogen bonds, van der Waals interactions, and hydrophobic interactions between the protein and lipid ligand. Such complexes are also stabilized by the formation of ionic bridges between the aspartate or glutamate residues of the protein and lipid phosphates via intervening calcium ions (Ca^{2+}). Such ionic bridges can occur and are stable when ions (such as Ca^{2+}) are already bound to a protein in solution, prior to lipid binding. The formation of ionic bridges is seen in the protein–lipid interaction between both protein C2 type domains and annexins..

=== Protein–lipid electrostatic interactions ===
Any positively charged protein will be attracted to a negatively charged membrane by nonspecific electrostatic interactions. However, not all peripheral peptides and proteins are cationic, and only certain sides of membrane are negatively charged. These include the cytoplasmic side of plasma membranes, the outer leaflet of bacterial outer membranes and mitochondrial membranes. Therefore, electrostatic interactions play an important role in membrane targeting of electron carriers such as cytochrome c, cationic toxins such as charybdotoxin, and specific membrane-targeting domains such as some PH domains, C1 domains, and C2 domains.

Electrostatic interactions are strongly dependent on the ionic strength of the solution. These interactions are relatively weak at the physiological ionic strength (0.14M NaCl): ~3 to 4 kcal/mol for small cationic proteins, such as cytochrome c, charybdotoxin or hisactophilin.

== Spatial position in membrane ==
Orientations and penetration depths of many amphitropic proteins and peptides in membranes are studied using site-directed spin labeling, chemical labeling, measurement of membrane binding affinities of protein mutants, fluorescence spectroscopy, solution or solid-state NMR spectroscopy, ATR FTIR spectroscopy, X-ray or neutron diffraction, and computational methods.

Two distinct membrane-association modes of proteins have been identified. Typical water-soluble proteins have no exposed nonpolar residues or any other hydrophobic anchors. Therefore, they remain completely in aqueous solution and do not penetrate into the lipid bilayer, which would be energetically costly. Such proteins interact with bilayers only electrostatically, for example, ribonuclease and poly-lysine interact with membranes in this mode. However, typical amphitropic proteins have various hydrophobic anchors that penetrate the interfacial region and reach the hydrocarbon interior of the membrane. Such proteins "deform" the lipid bilayer, decreasing the temperature of lipid fluid-gel transition. The binding is usually a strongly exothermic reaction. Association of amphiphilic α-helices with membranes occurs similarly. Intrinsically unstructured or unfolded peptides with nonpolar residues or lipid anchors can also penetrate the interfacial region of the membrane and reach the hydrocarbon core, especially when such peptides are cationic and interact with negatively charged membranes.

== Categories ==
=== Enzymes ===
Peripheral enzymes participate in metabolism of different membrane components, such as lipids (phospholipases and cholesterol oxidases), cell wall oligosaccharides (glycosyltransferase and transglycosidases), or proteins (signal peptidase and palmitoyl protein thioesterases). Lipases can also digest lipids that form micelles or nonpolar droplets in water.

Class	Function	Physiology	Structure
Alpha/beta hydrolase fold	Catalyzes the hydrolysis of chemical bonds.	Includes bacterial, fungal, gastric and pancreatic lipases, palmitoyl protein thioesterases, cutinase, and cholinesterases	central beta sheet inserted in between two layers of alpha helices
Phospholipase A2 (secretory and cytosolic)	Hydrolysis of sn-2 fatty acid bond of phospholipids.	Lipid digestion, membrane disruption, and lipid signaling.	contains catalytic amino acid triad: aspartic acid, serine, and histidine
Phospholipase C	Hydrolyzes PIP_{2}, a phosphatidylinositol, into two second messagers, inositol triphosphate and diacylglycerol.	Lipid signaling	core structure composed of a split triosephosphate isomerase (TIM) barrel which has an active site, catalytic residues, and a Ca^{2+} binding site
Cholesterol oxidases	Oxidizes and isomerizes cholesterol to cholest-4-en-3-one.	Depletes cellular membranes of cholesterol, used in bacterial pathogenesis.	two loops of residue which act as a lid on the active site
Carotenoid oxygenase	Cleaves carotenoids.	Carotenoids function in both plants and animals as hormones (includes vitamin A in humans), pigments, flavors, floral scents and defense compounds.	composed of multiple enzymes attached together forming branch-like structures
Lipoxygenases	Iron-containing enzymes that catalyze the dioxygenation of polyunsaturated fatty acids.	In animals lipoxygenases are involved in the synthesis of inflammatory mediators known as leukotrienes.	hundreds of amino acids that makes up a protein are organized into two domains: beta-sheet N terminal and helical C terminal
Alpha toxins	Cleave phospholipids in the cell membrane, similar to Phospholipase C.	Bacterial pathogenesis, particularly by Clostridium perfringens.	soluble monomer with oligomeric pre-pore complexes
Sphingomyelinase C	A phosphodiesterase, cleaves phosphodiester bonds.	Processing of lipids such as sphingomyelin.	saposin domain and connector regions with a metallophosphate catalytic domain.
Glycosyltransferases: MurG and Transglycosidases	Catalyzes the transfer of sugar moieties from activated donor molecules to specific acceptor molecules, forming glycosidic bonds.	Biosynthesis of disaccharides, oligosaccharides and polysaccharides (glycoconjugates), MurG is involved in bacterial peptidoglycan biosynthesis.	three glycine rich loops: one in the C terminal and two in the N terminal.
Ferrochelatase	Converts protoporphyrin IX into heme.	Involved in porphyrin metabolism, protoporphyrins are used to strengthen egg shells.	polypeptide folded into two domains that each have a four-stranded parallel beta sheet flanked by alpha helices
Myotubularin-related protein family	Lipid phosphatase that dephosphorylates PtdIns3P and PtdIns(3,5)P2.	Required for muscle cell differentiation.	contains a GRAM domain, SET interacting domain, and a PDZ binding domain.
Dihydroorotate dehydrogenases	Oxidation of dihydroorotate (DHO) to orotate.	Biosynthesis of pyrimidine nucleotides in prokaryotic and eukaryotic cells.	composed of two domains: alpha/beta barrel domain that contains the active site and an alpha-helical domain that forms the opening tunnel to the active site
Glycolate oxidase	Catalyses the oxidation of α-hydroxycarboxylic acids to the corresponding α-ketoacids.	In green plants, the enzyme participates in photorespiration. In animals, the enzyme participates in production of oxalate.	β8/α8 fold containing alpha helices, beta strands, and loops and turns

=== Membrane-targeting domains ("lipid clamps") ===
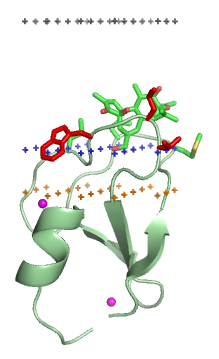
C1 domain of PKC-delta (1ptr) Middle plane of the lipid bilayer – black dots. Boundary of the hydrocarbon core region – blue dots (cytoplasmic side). Layer of lipid phosphates – yellow dots.

Membrane-targeting domains associate specifically with head groups of their lipid ligands embedded into the membrane. These lipid ligands are present in different concentrations in distinct types of biological membranes (for example, PtdIns3P can be found mostly in membranes of early endosomes, PtdIns(3,5)P2 in late endosomes, and PtdIns4P in the Golgi). Hence, each domain is targeted to a specific membrane.

- C1 domains and phorbol esters.
- C2 domains bind phosphatidylserine, phosphatidylcholine or PtdIns(3,4)P2 or PtdIns(4,5)P2.
- Pleckstrin homology domains, PX domains, and Tubby domains bind different phosphoinositides
- FYVE domains are more specific for PtdIns3P.
- ENTH domains bind PtdIns(3,4)P2 or PtdIns(4,5)P2.
- ANTH domain binds PtdIns(4,5)P2.
- Proteins from ERM (ezrin/radixin/moesin) family bind PtdIns(4,5)P2.
- Other phosphoinositide-binding proteins include phosphotyrosine-binding domain and certain PDZ domains. They bind PtdIns(4,5)P2.
- Discoidin domains of blood coagulation factors
- ENTH, VHS and ANTH domains

=== Structural domains ===
Structural domains mediate attachment of other proteins to membranes. Their binding to membranes can be mediated by calcium ions (Ca^{2+}) that form bridges between the acidic protein residues and phosphate groups of lipids, as in annexins or GLA domains.

Class	Function	Physiology	Structure
Annexins	Calcium-dependent intracellular membrane/ phospholipid binding.	Functions include vesicle trafficking, membrane fusion and ion channel formation.	
Synapsin I	Coats synaptic vesicles and binds to several cytoskeletal elements.	Functions in the regulation of neurotransmitter release.	
Synuclein	Unknown cellular function.	Thought to play a role in regulating the stability and/or turnover of the plasma membrane. Associated with both Parkinson's disease and Alzheimer's disease.	
GLA-domains of the coagulation system	Gamma-carboxyglutamate (GLA) domains are responsible for the high-affinity binding of calcium ions.	Involved in function of clotting factors in the blood coagulation cascade.	
Spectrin and α-actinin-2	Found in several cytoskeletal and microfilament proteins.	Maintenance of plasma membrane integrity and cytoskeletal structure.	

=== Transporters of small hydrophobic molecules ===
These peripheral proteins function as carriers of non-polar compounds between different types of cell membranes or between membranes and cytosolic protein complexes. The transported substances are phosphatidylinositol, tocopherol, gangliosides, glycolipids, sterol derivatives, retinol, fatty acids, water, macromolecules, red blood cells, phospholipids, and nucleotides.

- Glycolipid transfer proteins
- Lipocalins including retinol binding proteins and fatty acid-binding proteins
- Polyisoprenoid-binding protein, such as YceI protein domain
- Ganglioside GM2 activator proteins
- CRAL-TRIO domain (α-Tocopherol and phosphatidylinositol sec14p transfer proteins)
- Sterol carrier proteins
- Phosphatidylinositol transfer proteins and STAR domains
- Oxysterol-binding protein

=== Electron carriers ===
These proteins are involved in electron transport chains. They include cytochrome c, cupredoxins, high potential iron protein, adrenodoxin reductase, some flavoproteins, and others.

=== Polypeptide hormones, toxins, and antimicrobial peptides ===
Many hormones, toxins, inhibitors, or antimicrobial peptides interact specifically with transmembrane protein complexes. They can also accumulate at the lipid bilayer surface, prior to binding their protein targets. Such polypeptide ligands are often positively charged and interact electrostatically with anionic membranes.

Some water-soluble proteins and peptides can also form transmembrane channels. They usually undergo oligomerization, significant conformational changes, and associate with membranes irreversibly. 3D structure of one such transmembrane channel, α-hemolysin, has been determined. In other cases, the experimental structure represents a water-soluble conformation that interacts with the lipid bilayer peripherally, although some of the channel-forming peptides are rather hydrophobic and therefore were studied by NMR spectroscopy in organic solvents or in the presence of micelles.

Class	Proteins	Physiology
Venom toxins	Scorpion venom; Snake venom; Conotoxins; Poneratoxin (insect)	Well known types of biotoxins include neurotoxins, cytotoxins, hemotoxins and necrotoxins. Biotoxins have two primary functions: predation (snake, scorpion and cone snail toxins) and defense (honeybee and ant toxins).
Sea anemone toxins	Sea anemone sodium channel inhibitory toxin; Neurotoxin III; Cytolysins	Inhibition of sodium and potassium channels and membrane pore formation are the primary actions of over 40 known Sea anemone peptide toxins. Sea anemone are carnivorous animals and use toxins in predation and defense; anemone toxin is of similar toxicity as the most toxic organophosphate chemical warfare agents.
Bacterial toxins	Perfringolysin O; Botulinum toxin B; Heat-stable enterotoxin B; δ-Endotoxins; Bacteriocins, such as microcin); Lantibiotic peptides, such as nisin); Gramicidin S	Microbial toxins are the primary virulence factors for a variety of pathogenic bacteria. Some toxins, are Pore forming toxins that lyse cellular membranes. Other toxins inhibit protein synthesis or activate second messenger pathways causing dramatic alterations to signal transduction pathways critical in maintaining a variety of cellular functions. Several bacterial toxins can act directly on the immune system, by acting as superantigens and causing massive T cell proliferation, which overextends the immune system. Botulinum toxin is a neurotoxin that prevents neuro-secretory vesicles from docking/fusing with the nerve synapse plasma membrane, inhibiting neurotransmitter release.
Fungal toxins	Cyclic lipopeptide antibiotics Surfactin and daptomycin; Peptaibols	These peptides are characterized by the presence of an unusual amino acid, α-aminoisobutyric acid, and exhibit antibiotic and antifungal properties due to their membrane channel-forming activities.
Antimicrobial peptides	HP peptide; Saposin B and NK-lysin; Lactoferricin B; Magainin, and Pleurocidin	The modes of action by which antimicrobial peptides kill bacteria is varied and includes disrupting membranes, interfering with metabolism, and targeting cytoplasmic components. In contrast to many conventional antibiotics these peptides appear to be bacteriocidal instead of bacteriostatic.
Defensins	Insect defensins; Plant defensins, including Cyclotides and thionins	Defensins are a type of antimicrobial peptide; and are an important component of virtually all innate host defenses against microbial invasion. Defensins penetrate microbial cell membranes by way of electrical attraction, and form a pore in the membrane allowing efflux, which ultimately leads to the lysis of microorganisms.
Neuronal peptides	Tachykinin peptides	These proteins excite neurons, evoke behavioral responses, are potent vasodilatators, and are responsible for contraction in many types of smooth muscle.
Apoptosis regulators	Bcl-2	Members of the Bcl-2 family govern mitochondrial outer membrane permeability. Bcl-2 itself suppresses apoptosis in a variety of cell types including lymphocytes and neuronal cells.

== See also ==
- Lipoproteins
- Membrane proteins
