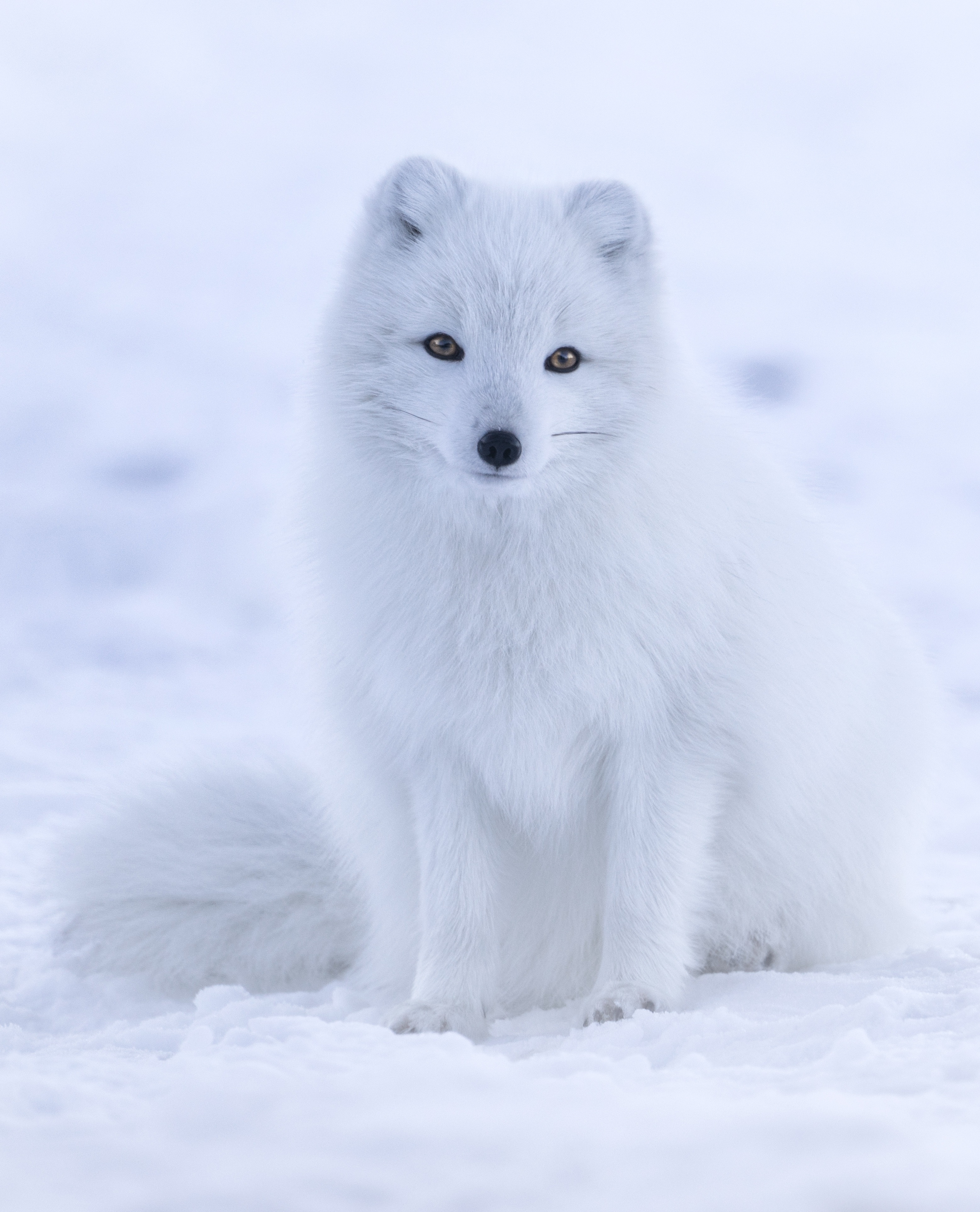
- Winter coat, Iceland
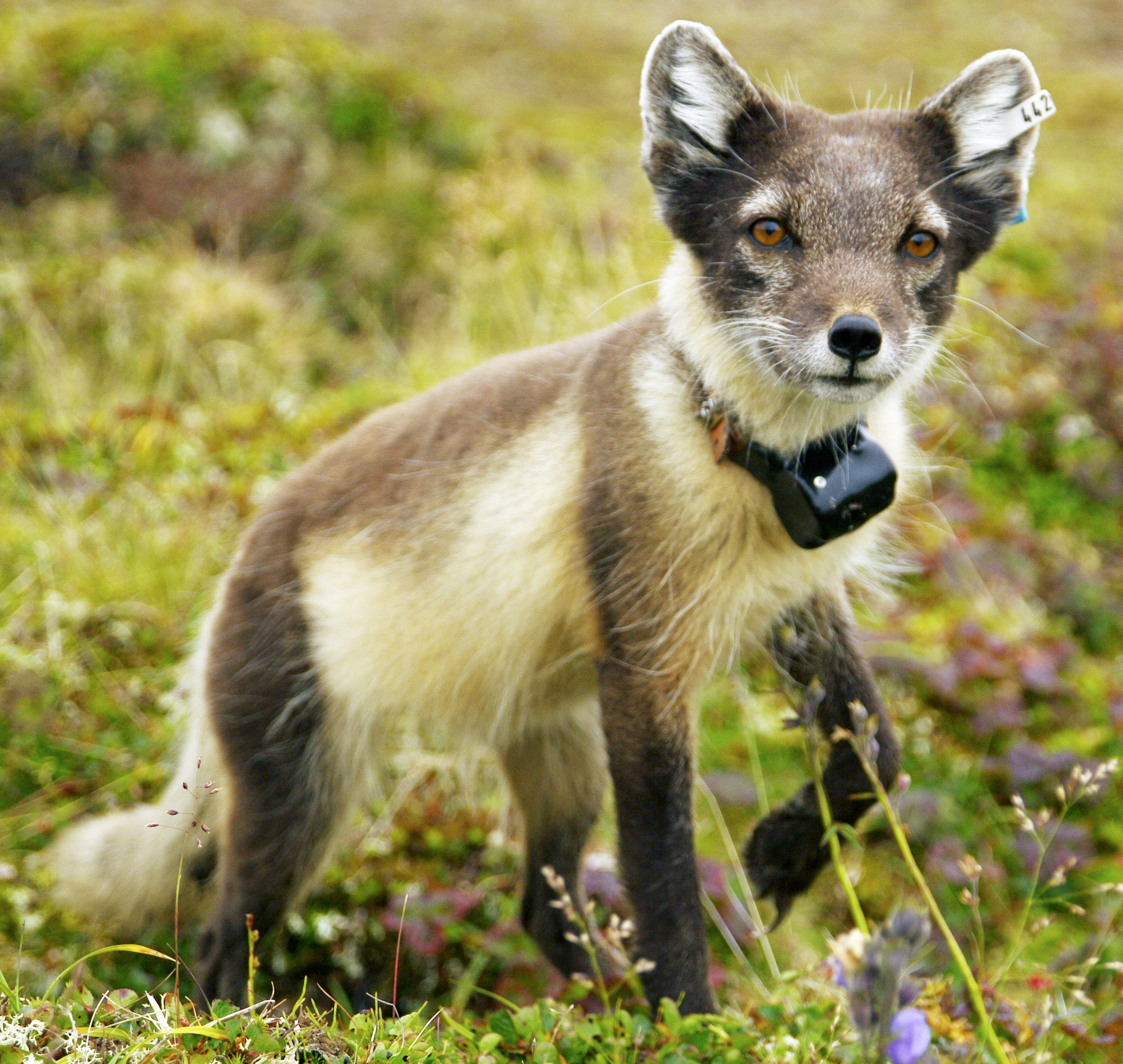
- Summer coat with radio collar, Russia

Conservation status
- Least Concern (IUCN 3.1)

- Secure (NatureServe)

Scientific classification
- Kingdom: Animalia
- Phylum: Chordata
- Class: Mammalia
- Order: Carnivora
- Family: Canidae
- Genus: Vulpes
- Species: V. lagopus

Binomial name
- Vulpes lagopus (Linnaeus, 1758)
- Arctic fox range

Synonyms
- Alopex lagopus (Linnaeus, 1758); Canis lagopus (Linnaeus, 1758); Canis fuliginosus (Bechstein, 1799); Canis groenlandicus (Bechstein, 1799); Vulpes arctica (Oken, 1816); Vulpes hallensis (Merriam, 1900); Vulpes pribilofensis (Merriam, 1903); Vulpes beringensis (Merriam, 1903)

= Arctic fox =

Species of fox

The Arctic fox (Vulpes lagopus), also known as the white fox, polar fox, or snow fox, is a small species of fox native to the Arctic regions of the Northern Hemisphere and common throughout the Arctic tundra. It is well adapted to living in cold environments, and is known for its thick, warm fur that can be used as camouflage against snow in the winter. It has a large and fluffy tail. In the wild, most individuals do not live past their first year but some exceptional ones survive up to 11 years. Its body length ranges from 46 to 68 cm (18 to 27 in), with a generally rounded body shape to minimize the escape of body heat.

The Arctic fox preys on many small creatures such as lemmings, voles, ringed seal pups, fish, waterfowl, and seabirds. It also eats carrion, berries, seaweed, and insects and other small invertebrates. Arctic foxes form monogamous pairs during the breeding season and they stay together to raise their young in complex underground dens. Occasionally, other family members may assist in raising their young. Natural predators of the Arctic fox include golden eagles, Arctic wolves, polar bears, wolverines, red foxes, and brown bears.

== Description ==
The Arctic fox is smaller than the red fox, standing 25–30 cm (9.8–11.8 in) tall at the shoulder. Males weigh 3.5 kg (7.7 lb) on average, with a range of 3.2–9.4 kg (7.1–20.7 lb), while females average 2.9 kg (6.4 lb), with a range of 1.4–3.2 kg (3.1–7.1 lb). The average head-to-rear length of males is 55 cm (22 in), ranging from 46–68 cm (18–27 in), while females average 52 cm (20 in) with a range of 41–55 cm (16–22 in). Foxes that live further north are smaller than more southern foxes. The tail is about one third the length of the body.

=== Fur coat ===
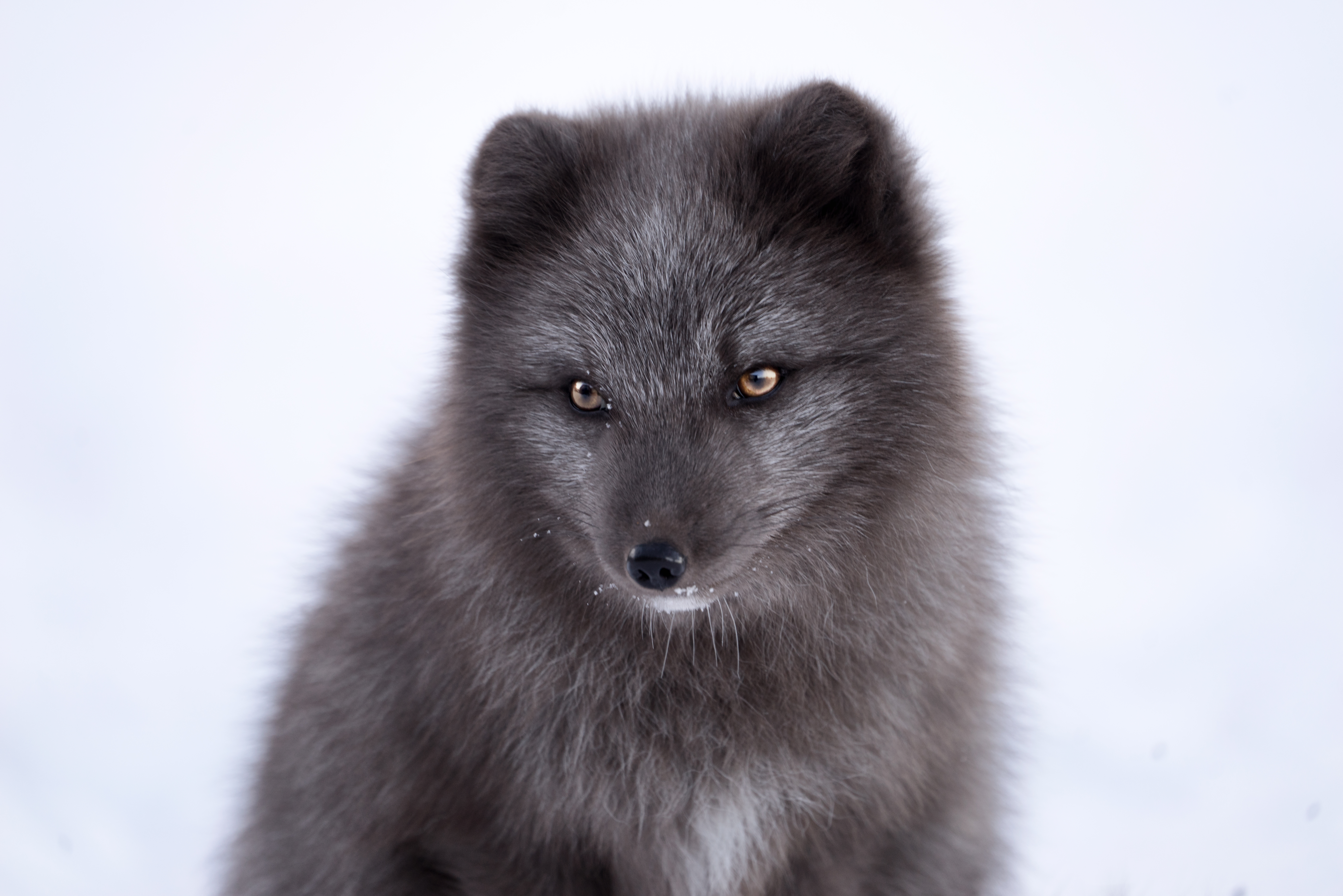
The blue morph in winter, Iceland

Arctic foxes shed twice a year, switching between their summer coat, which is darker, and their winter coat, which is lighter. The summer coat is short, and the winter coat is long and thick in order to retain heat. The winter coat is twice the length of the summer coat.

There are two genetically distinct coat color morphs: white and blue. The white morph is generally brown with lighter brown-to-cream sides and belly in the summer, and becomes entirely white in the winter. The blue morph is generally black, brown, or grey in the summer, becoming slightly lighter in the winter. Two similar mutations to MC1R cause the blue color and the relative lack of seasonal color change. Although the blue allele is dominant over the white allele, 90% of the global population, 97–99% of the continental circumpolar population and 84–97% of the Svalbard population is white. The blue morph is most common in Iceland and Fennoscandia, where it comprises 65–70% and 25–30% of the population respectively. The fur of the Arctic fox provides the best insulation of any mammal.

=== Adaptations to the cold ===
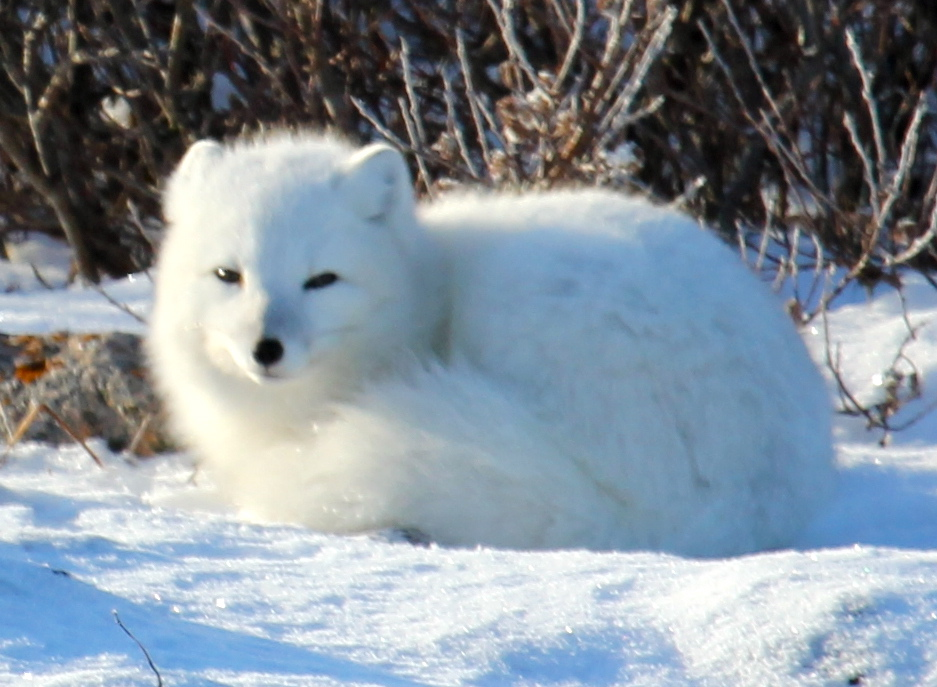
A fox's thick winter coat helps keep its body temperature near 38 °C (100 °F). Foxes also have fur on the soles of their feet and reduced blood flow to their legs to help keep them warm.

Among its adaptations for survival in the cold is its dense, multilayered winter coat, of which 70% is fine underfur, providing excellent insulation. The Arctic fox has a low surface area to volume ratio, as evidenced by its generally compact body shape, short muzzle and legs, and short, thick ears. Since less of its surface area is exposed to the Arctic cold, less heat escapes from its body.

The regions that have the greatest heat loss are the nose, ears, legs, and feet, which is useful in the summer for thermal heat regulation. The Arctic fox has a beneficial mechanism in their nose for evaporative cooling like dogs, which keeps the brain cool during the summer and exercise. About 22% of the total body surface area of the Arctic fox dissipates heat quickly compared to red foxes at 33%. The thermal conductivity of Arctic fox fur in the summer and winter is the same; however, the thermal conductance of the Arctic fox in the winter is lower than the summer since fur thickness increases by 140%. In the summer, the thermal conductance of the Arctic foxes body is 114% higher than the winter, but their body core temperature is constant year-round.

One way that Arctic foxes regulate their body temperature is by utilizing a countercurrent heat exchange in the blood of their legs. Arctic foxes can constantly keep their feet above the tissue freezing point (−1 °C (30 °F)) when standing on cold substrates without losing mobility or feeling pain. They do this by increasing vasodilation and blood flow to a capillary rete in the pad surface, which is in direct contact with the snow rather than the entire foot. They selectively vasoconstrict blood vessels in the center of the foot pad, which conserves energy and minimizes heat loss. Arctic foxes maintain the temperature in their paws independently from the core temperature. If the core temperature drops, the pad of the foot will remain constantly above the tissue freezing point.

The average mass specific basal metabolic rate (BMR) and total BMR are 37% and 27% lower in the winter than the summer. The Arctic fox decreases its BMR by slowing down its metabolism in the winter to conserve fat storage and minimize energy requirements. The lower critical temperature of the Arctic fox is at −7 °C (19 °F) in the winter and 5 °C (41 °F) in the summer. It was commonly believed that the Arctic fox had a lower critical temperature below −40 °C (−40 °F). However, some scientists have concluded that this statistic is not accurate since it was never tested using the proper equipment.

The Arctic fox contains advantageous genes to overcome extreme cold and starvation periods. Transcriptome sequencing has identified two genes that are under positive selection: Glycolipid transfer protein domain containing 1 (GLTPD1) and V-akt murine thymoma viral oncogene homolog 2 (AKT2). GLTPD1 is involved in the fatty acid metabolism, while AKT2 pertains to the glucose metabolism and insulin signaling.

=== Senses ===
The Arctic fox has a functional hearing range between 125 Hz and 16 kHz with a sensitivity that is ≤ 60 dB in air, and an average peak sensitivity of 24 dB at 4 kHz. Overall, the Arctic foxes' hearing is less sensitive than the dog and the kit fox. The Arctic fox and the kit fox have a low upper-frequency limit compared to the domestic dog and other carnivores. The Arctic fox can easily hear lemmings burrowing under 4-5 inches of snow. When it has located its prey, it pounces and punches through the snow to catch its prey.

The Arctic fox also has a keen sense of smell. They can smell carcasses that are often left by polar bears anywhere from 10 to 40 km (6.2 to 24.9 mi). It is possible that they use their sense of smell to also track down polar bears. Additionally, Arctic foxes can smell and find frozen lemmings under 46–77 cm (18–30 in) of snow, and can detect a subnivean seal lair under 150 cm (59 in) of snow.

== Behavior and ecology ==
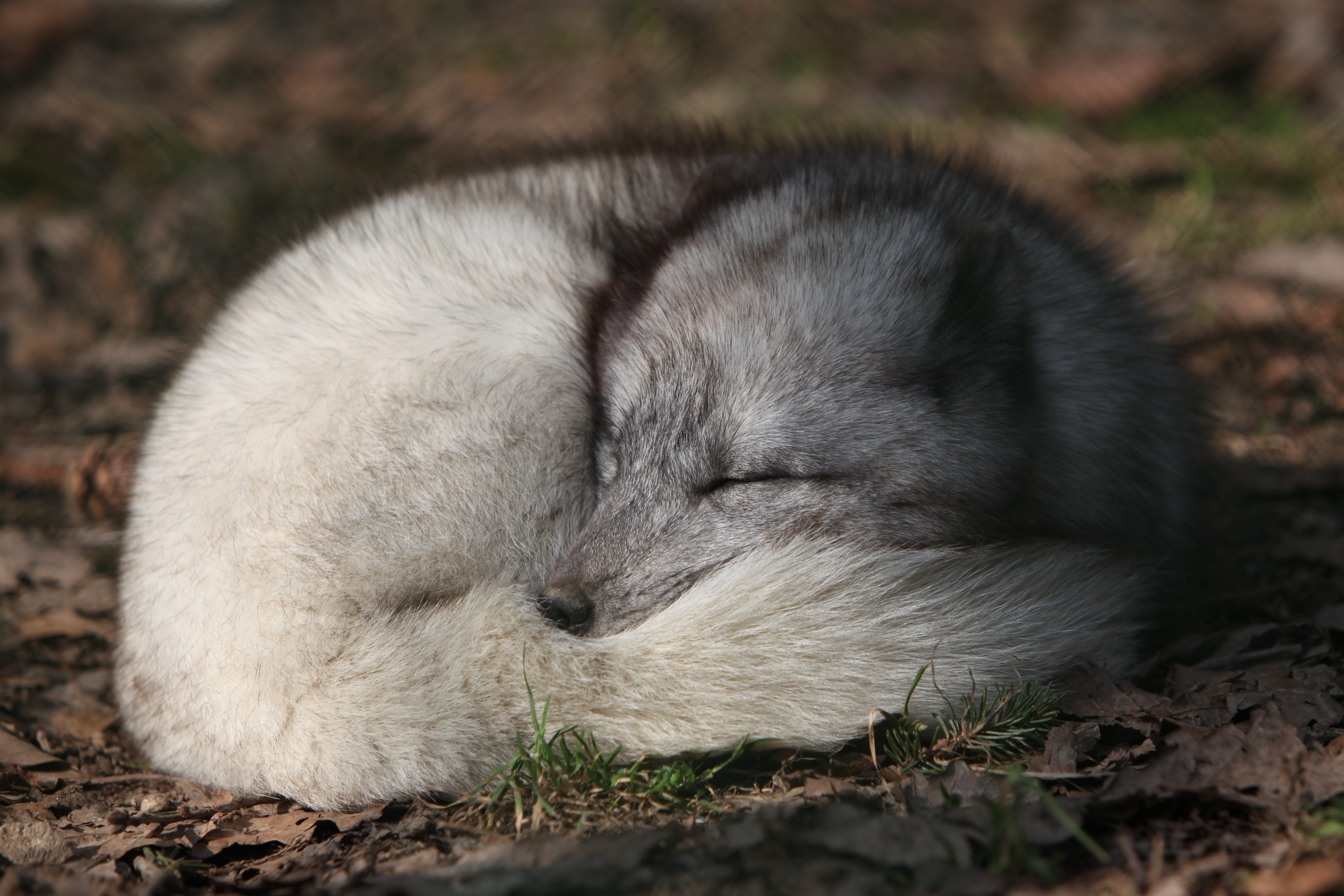
A sleeping Arctic fox with its tail wrapped around itself and over its face

Arctic foxes must endure a temperature difference of up to 90–100 °C (160–180 °F) between the external environment and their internal core temperature. To prevent heat loss, the Arctic fox curls up tightly tucking its legs and head under its body and behind its furry tail. This position gives the fox the smallest surface area to volume ratio and protects the least insulated areas. Arctic foxes also stay warm by getting out of the wind and residing in their dens. Although the Arctic foxes are active year-round and do not hibernate, they attempt to preserve fat by reducing their locomotor activity. They build up their fat reserves in the autumn, sometimes increasing their body weight by more than 50%. This provides greater insulation during the winter and a source of energy when food is scarce.

=== Reproduction ===
In the spring, the Arctic fox's attention switches to reproduction and a home for their potential offspring. They live in large dens in frost-free, slightly raised ground. These are complex systems of tunnels covering as much as 1,000 m^{2} (11,000 sq ft) and are often in eskers, long ridges of sedimentary material deposited in formerly glaciated regions. These dens may be in existence for many decades and are used by many generations of foxes.

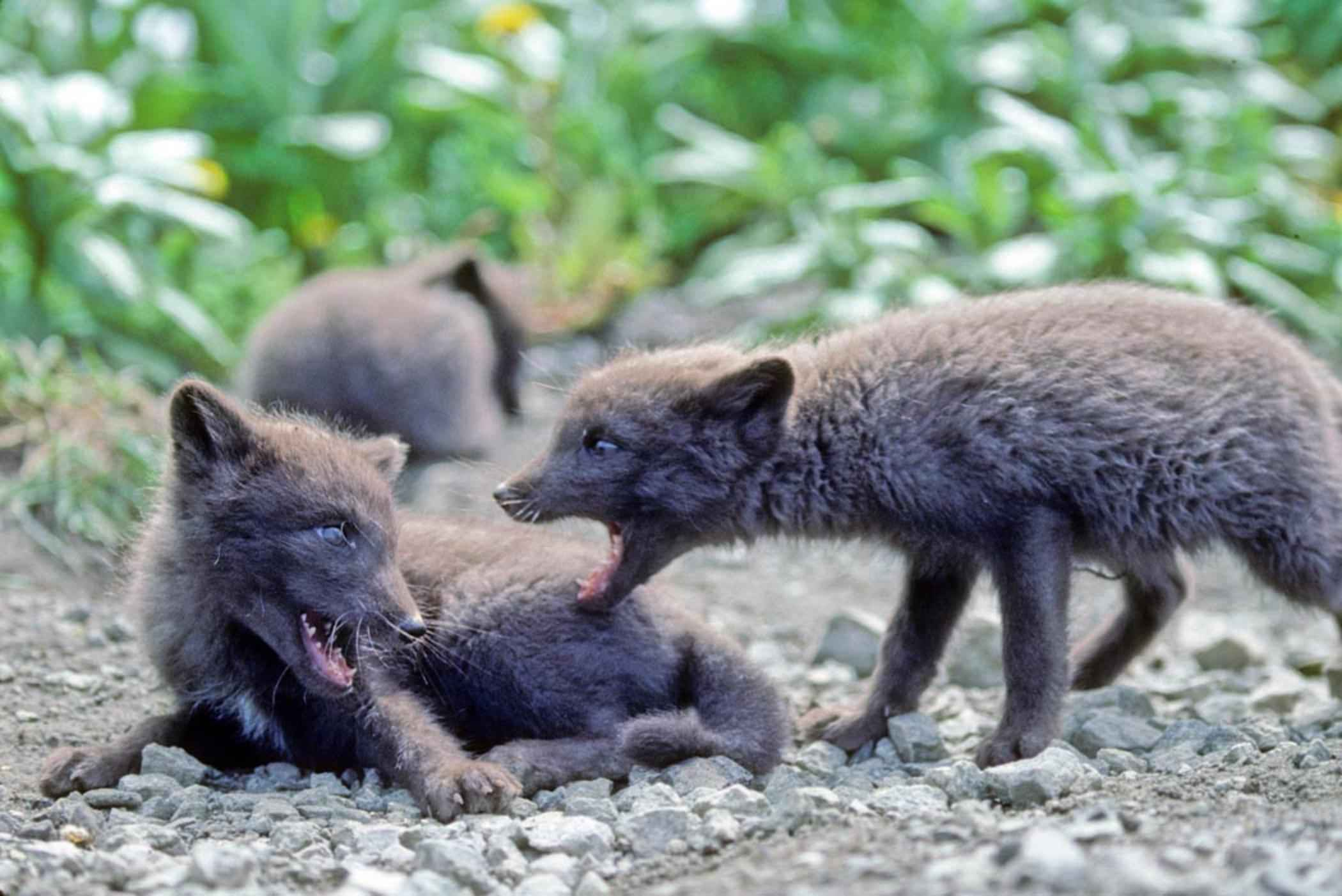
Pups in summer, Alaska

Arctic foxes tend to select dens that are easily accessible with many entrances, and that are clear from snow and ice making it easier to burrow in. The Arctic fox builds and chooses dens that face southward towards the sun, which makes the den warmer. Arctic foxes prefer large, maze-like dens for predator evasion and a quick escape especially when red foxes are in the area. Natal dens are typically found in rugged terrain, which may provide more protection for the pups. But, the parents will also relocate litters to nearby dens to avoid predators. When red foxes are not in the region, Arctic foxes will use dens that the red fox previously occupied. Shelter quality is more important to the Arctic fox than the proximity of spring prey to a den.

Breeding usually takes place in April and May, and the gestation period is about 52 days. In the late spring or early summer, the fox gives birth to its young, called pups. Litters may contain from 3 to as many as 25 pups (the largest litter size in the order Carnivora). Litter size varies considerably by region; generally, white morph foxes, who tend to live inland, mainly prey on lemmings. Because of this, white foxes' reproduction rates reflect the lemming population density, which cyclically fluctuates every 3–5 years. When lemmings are abundant, the white fox can give birth to 6–18 pups, but they often do not reproduce when food is scarce. The blue morph, on the other hand, tends to live on the coast, where food availability is relatively consistent: they will have around 5–6 pups each year.

The pups weigh only 60–90 g (2.1–3.2 oz) when they're born. They are blind and deaf until 14–16 days old. The pups emerge from the den at 3 to 4 weeks old, and are weaned by 7 weeks. Their fur remains dark until 8 weeks of age.

Arctic foxes are primarily monogamous and both parents will care for the offspring. When predators and prey are abundant, Arctic foxes are more likely to be promiscuous (exhibited in both males and females) and display more complex social structures. Larger packs of foxes consisting of breeding or non-breeding males or females can guard a single territory more proficiently to increase pup survival. When resources are scarce, competition increases and the number of foxes in a territory decreases. On the coasts of Svalbard, the frequency of complex social structures is larger than inland foxes that remain monogamous due to food availability. In Scandinavia, there are more complex social structures compared to other populations due to the presence of the red fox. Also, conservationists are supplying the declining population with supplemental food. One unique case, however, is Iceland where monogamy is the most prevalent. The older offspring (1-year-olds) often remain within their parent's territory even though predators are absent and there are fewer resources, which may indicate kin selection.

Lifespan averages 3–4 years past puphood, but some foxes reach as old as 11. The oldest age ever recorded for an Arctic fox was age 16, in captivity.

=== Diet ===
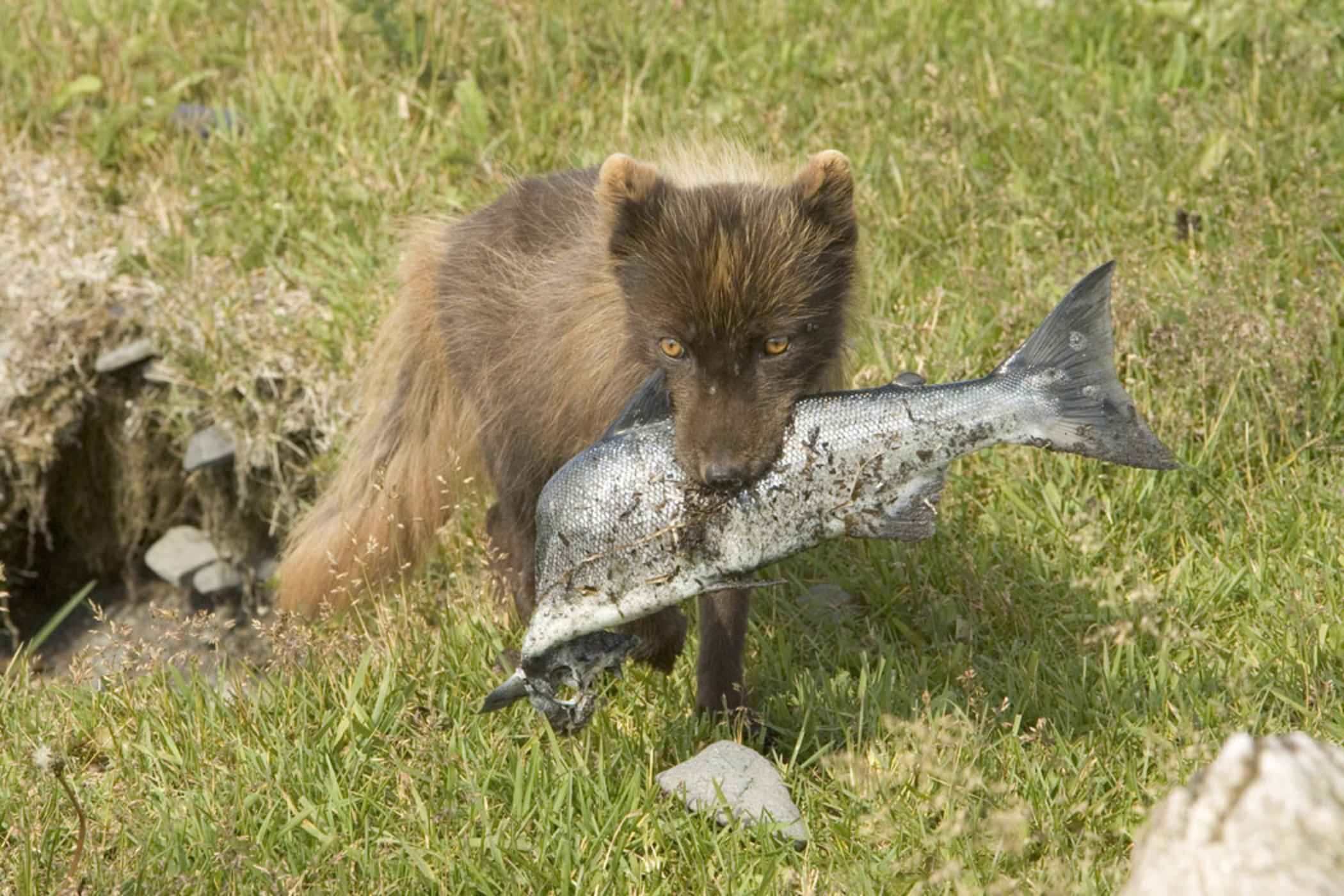
An Arctic fox with a salmon in its mouth, Alaska

Arctic foxes generally eat any small animal they can find, including lemmings, voles, other rodents, hares, birds, eggs, fish, and carrion. They scavenge on carcasses left by larger predators such as wolves and polar bears, and in times of scarcity also eat their feces. In areas where they are present, lemmings are their most common prey, and a family of foxes can eat dozens of lemmings each day. In some locations in northern Canada, a high seasonal abundance of migrating birds that breed in the area may provide an important food source. On the coast of Iceland and other islands, their diet consists predominantly of birds. During April and May, the Arctic fox also preys on ringed seal pups when the young animals are confined to a snow den and are relatively helpless. They also consume berries and seaweed, so they may be considered omnivores. This fox is a significant bird-egg predator, consuming eggs of all except the largest tundra bird species.

Arctic foxes survive harsh winters and food scarcity by either hoarding food or storing body fat subcutaneously and viscerally. At the beginning of winter, one Arctic fox has approximately 14740 kJ of energy storage from fat alone. Using the lowest BMR value measured in Arctic foxes, an average sized fox of 3.5 kg (7.7 lb) would need 471 kJ/day during the winter to survive. In Canada, Arctic foxes acquire from snow goose eggs at a rate of 2.7–7.3 eggs/h and store 80–97% of them. Scats provide evidence that they eat the eggs during the winter after caching. Isotope analysis shows that eggs can still be eaten after a year, and the metabolizable energy of a stored goose egg only decreases by 11% after 60 days; a fresh egg has about 816 kJ. Eggs stored in the summer are accessed the following spring prior to reproduction.

=== Predators ===
Predators of Arctic foxes include large birds of prey, such as bald eagles, golden eagles, hawks, and snowy owls, and fellow carnivorans such as wolves, brown bears, polar bears, wolverines, and their cousins, the red fox. Domestic dogs are an introduced threat, occasionally targeting Arctic foxes.

== Taxonomy ==
Vulpes lagopus is a 'true fox' belonging to the genus Vulpes of the fox tribe Vulpini, which consists of 12 extant species. It is classified under the subfamily Caninae of the canid family Canidae. Although it has previously been assigned to its own monotypic genus Alopex, more recent genetic evidence places it in the genus Vulpes along with the majority of other foxes.

The cladogram below is based on the phylogeny of Lindblad-Toh (2005) modified to incorporate recent findings on Vulpes.

1890 illustration of arctic fox as Canis lagopus by John Gerrard Keulemans, showing both winter and summer coats

Arctic fox within Vulpes
- Vulpes
  - - Vulpes zerda (Fennec fox)
    - Vulpes cana (Blanford's fox)
  - - Vulpes chama (Cape fox)
    - - - - Vulpes vulpes (Red fox)
          - Vulpes rueppellii (Rüppell's fox)
        - - Vulpes corsac (Corsac fox)
          - Vulpes ferrilata (Tibetan fox)
      - - Vulpes macrotis (Kit fox)
        - Vulpes lagopus (Arctic fox)

It was originally described by Carl Linnaeus in the 10th edition of Systema Naturae in 1758 as Canis lagopus. The type specimen was recovered from Lapland, Sweden. The generic name vulpes is Latin for "fox". The specific name lagopus is derived from Ancient Greek λαγώς (lagōs, "hare") and πούς (pous, "foot"), referring to the hair on its feet similar to those found in cold-climate species of hares.

The Arctic fox and the red fox (Vulpes vulpes) diverged approximately 3.17MYA. Additionally, the Arctic fox diverged from its sister group, the kit fox (Vulpes macrotis), at about 0.9MYA.

=== Origins ===
The origins of the Arctic fox have been described by the "out of Tibet" hypothesis. On the Tibetan Plateau, fossils of the extinct ancestral Arctic fox (Vulpes qiuzhudingi) from the early Pliocene (5.08–3.6 MYA) were found along with many other precursors of modern mammals that evolved during the Pliocene (5.3–2.6 MYA). It is believed that this ancient fox is the ancestor of the modern Arctic fox. Globally, the Pliocene was about 2–3 °C warmer than today, and the Arctic during the summer in the mid-Pliocene was 8 °C warmer. By using stable carbon and oxygen isotope analysis of fossils, researchers claim that the Tibetan Plateau experienced tundra-like conditions during the Pliocene and harbored cold-adapted mammals that later spread to North America and Eurasia during the Pleistocene Epoch (2.6 million-11,700 years ago).

=== Subspecies ===
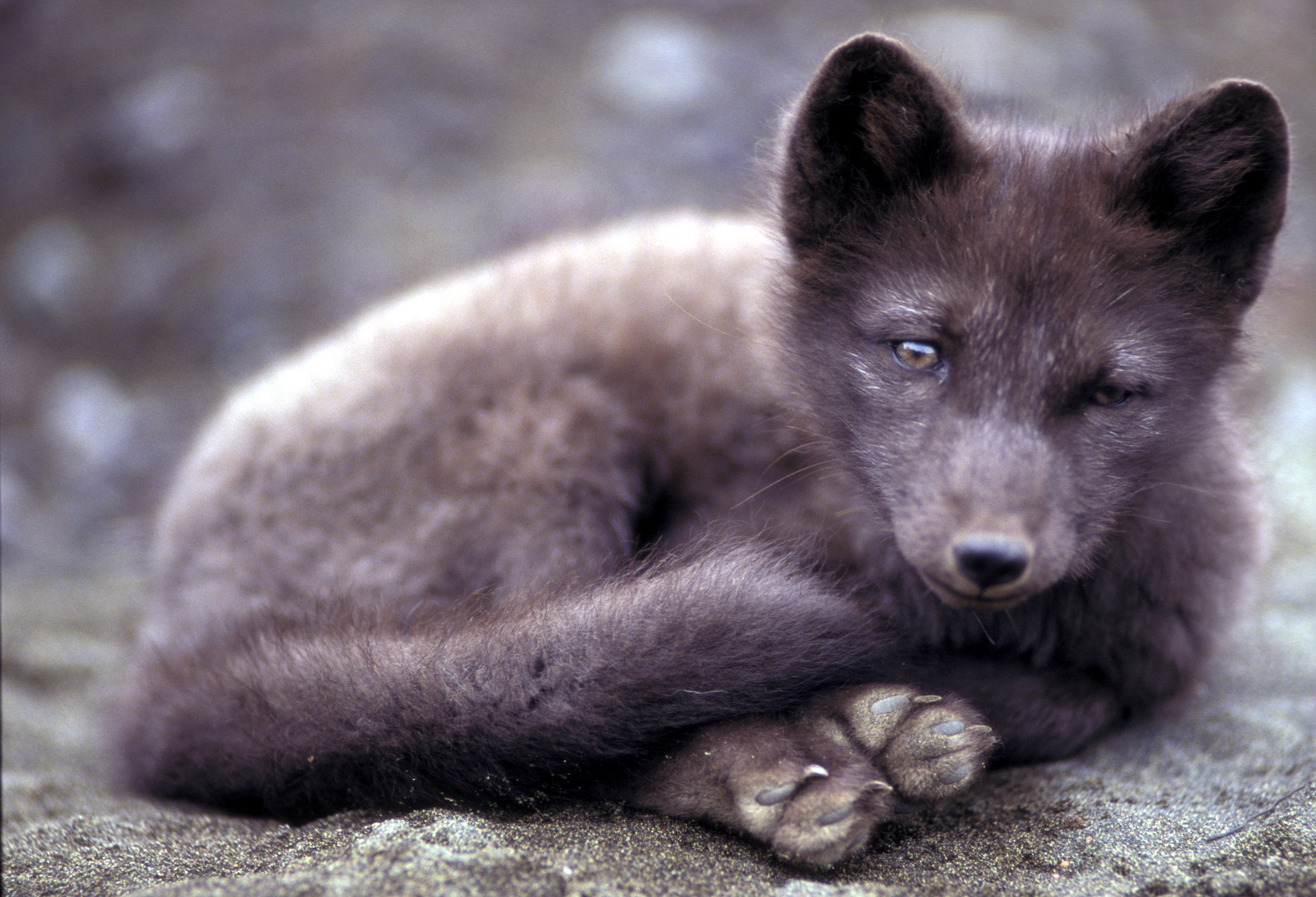
Blue morph pup of the Pribilof Islands Arctic fox

Besides the nominate subspecies, the common Arctic fox, V. l. lagopus, four other subspecies of this fox have been described:

- Bering Islands Arctic fox, V. l. beringensis
- Greenland Arctic fox, V. l. foragoapusis
- Iceland Arctic fox, V. l. fuliginosus
- Pribilof Islands Arctic fox, V. l. pribilofensis

== Distribution and habitat ==
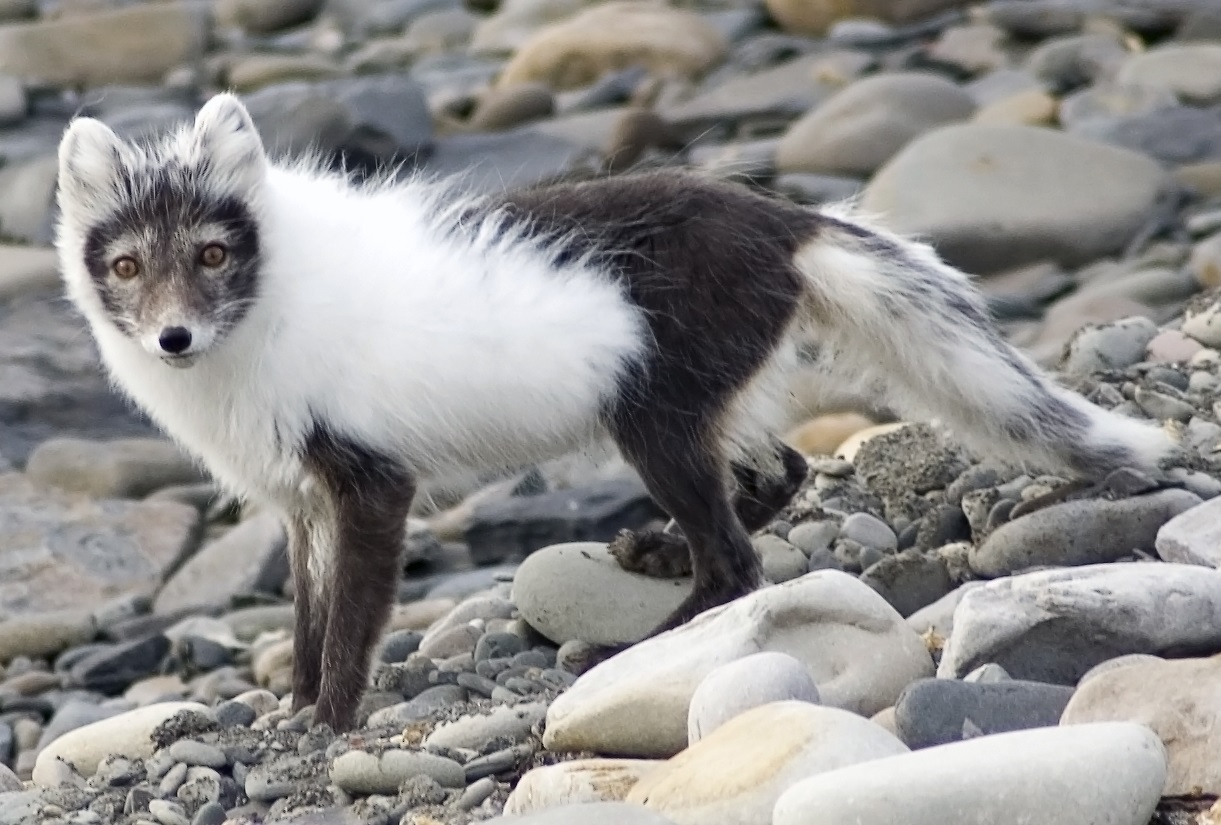
Halfway through moulting into summer coat, Svalbard

The Arctic fox has a circumpolar distribution and occurs in Arctic tundra habitats in northern Europe, northern Asia, and North America. Its range includes Iceland, Fennoscandia, Svalbard, and other islands in the Barents Sea, northern Russia, islands in the Bering Sea, Greenland, Alaska, and Canada as far south as Hudson Bay. In the late 19th century, it was introduced into the Aleutian Islands southwest of Alaska. However, the population on the Aleutian Islands is currently being eradicated in conservation efforts to preserve the local bird population. It mostly inhabits tundra and pack ice, but is also present in Canadian boreal forests (northeastern Alberta, northern Saskatchewan, northern Manitoba, Northern Ontario, Northern Quebec, and Newfoundland and Labrador) and the Kenai Peninsula in Alaska. They are found at elevations up to 3,000 m (9,800 ft) above sea level and have been seen on sea ice close to the North Pole.

The Arctic fox is the only land mammal native to Iceland. It came to the isolated North Atlantic island at the end of the last ice age, walking over the frozen sea. The Arctic Fox Center in Súðavík contains an exhibition on the Arctic fox and conducts studies on the influence of tourism on the population. Its range during the last ice age was much more extensive than it is now, and fossil remains of the Arctic fox have been found over much of northern Europe and Siberia.

The Arctic fox is locally extinct on Jan Mayen. It used to be locally extinct on Bear Island, until it was reintroduced naturally by crossing sea ice.

The color of the fox's coat also determines where they are most likely to be found. The white morph mainly lives inland and blends in with the snowy tundra, while the blue morph occupies the coasts because its dark color blends in with the cliffs and rocks.

=== Migrations and travel ===
During the winter, 95% of Arctic foxes utilize commuting trips, which remain within the fox's home range. Commuting trips in Arctic foxes last less than 3 days and occur between 0–2.9 times a month. Nomadism is found in 3.4% of the foxes, and loop migrations (where the fox travels to a new range, then returns to its home range) are the least common at 1%. Arctic foxes in Canada that undergo nomadism and migrations voyage from the Canadian archipelago to Greenland and northwestern Canada. The duration and distance traveled between males and females is not significantly different.

Arctic foxes closer to goose colonies (located at the coasts) are less likely to migrate. Meanwhile, foxes experiencing low-density lemming populations are more likely to make sea ice trips. Residency is common in the Arctic fox population so that they can maintain their territories. Migratory foxes have a mortality rate >3 times higher than resident foxes. Nomadic behavior becomes more common as the foxes age.

In July 2019, the Norwegian Polar Institute reported the story of a yearling female which was fitted with a GPS tracking device and then released by their researchers on the east coast of Spitsbergen in the Svalbard group of islands. The young fox crossed the polar ice from the islands to Greenland in 21 days, a distance of 1,512 km (940 mi). She then moved on to Ellesmere Island in northern Canada, covering a total recorded distance of 3,506 km (2,179 mi) in 76 days, before her GPS tracker stopped working. She averaged just over 46 km (29 mi) a day, and managed as much as 155 km (96 mi) in a single day.

== Conservation status ==
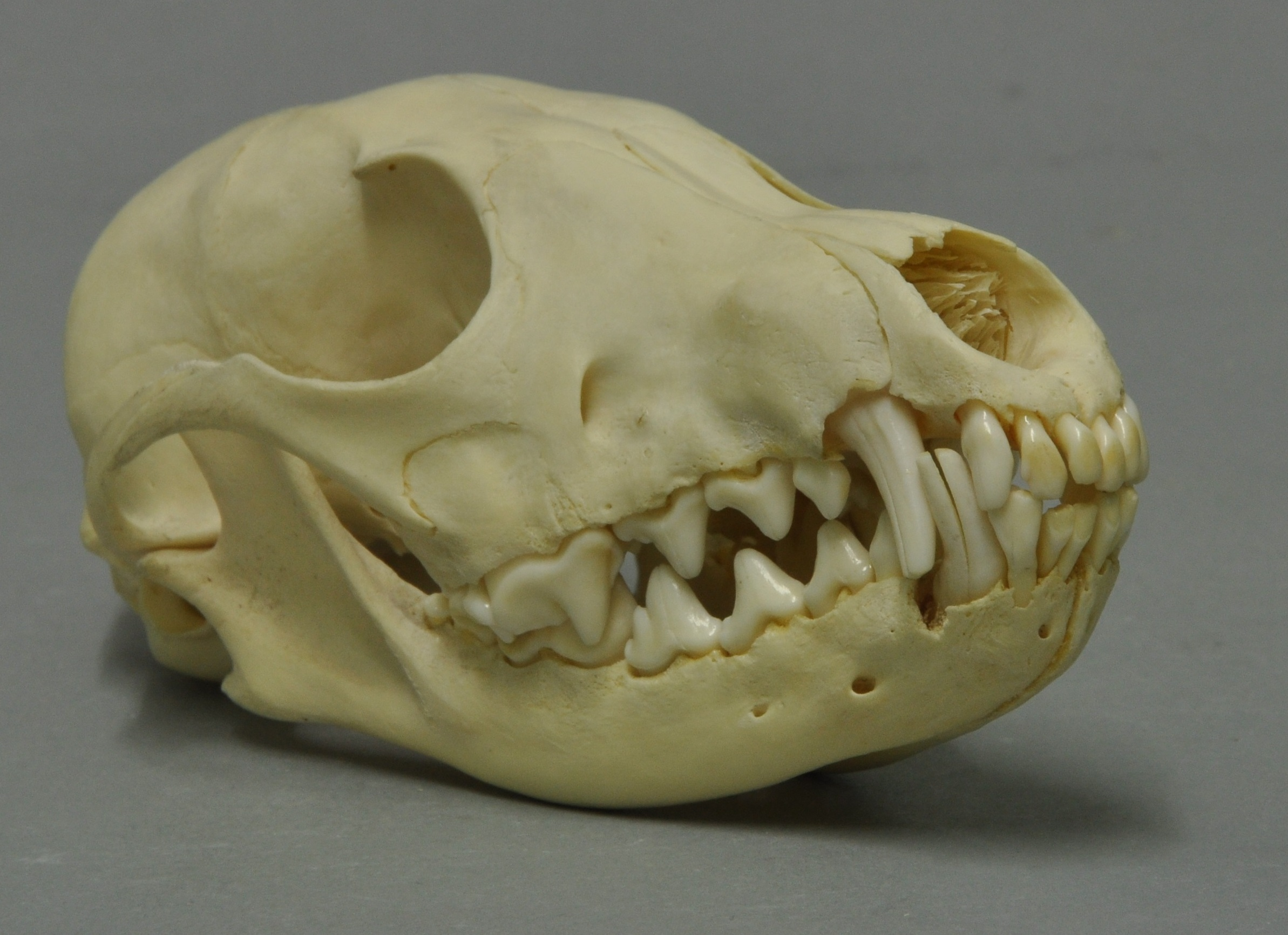
An Arctic fox skull

The Arctic fox has been assessed as least concern on the IUCN Red List since 2004. However, the Scandinavian mainland population has been endangered, despite being legally protected from hunting and persecution for several decades. The estimate of the adult population in all of Norway, Sweden, and Finland was fewer than 200 individuals in 2012. Of these, especially in Finland, the Arctic fox was even classified as critically endangered, because even though the animal was declared a protected species in Finland in 1940, the population had not recovered despite that. As a result, the populations of Arctic fox have been carefully studied and inventoried in places such as the Vindelfjällens Nature Reserve (Sweden), which has the Arctic fox as its symbol. A series of Norwegian–Swedish–Finnish conservation projects which ran from 2010 to 2026, Felles Fjellrev, helped increase the Nordic population to 400–500 individuals. As of 2026, the Arctic fox is listed as endangered in the Fennoscandian region.

The abundance of the Arctic fox tends to fluctuate in a cycle along with the population of lemmings and voles (a 3- to 4-year cycle). The populations are especially vulnerable during the years when the prey population crashes, and uncontrolled trapping has almost eradicated two subpopulations.

The pelts of Arctic foxes with a slate-blue coloration were especially valuable. They were transported to various previously fox-free Aleutian Islands during the 1920s. The program was successful in terms of increasing the population of blue foxes, but their predation of Aleutian Canada geese conflicted with the goal of preserving that species.

The Arctic fox is losing ground to the larger red fox. This has been attributed to climate change—the camouflage value of its lighter coat decreases with less snow cover. Red foxes dominate where their ranges begin to overlap by killing Arctic foxes and their kits. An alternative explanation of the red fox's gains involves the gray wolf. Historically, it has kept red fox numbers down, but as the wolf has been hunted to near extinction in much of its former range, the red fox population has grown larger, and it has taken over the niche of top predator. In areas of northern Europe, programs are in place that allow the hunting of red foxes in the Arctic fox's previous range.

As with many other game species, the best sources of historical and large-scale population data are hunting bag records and questionnaires. Several potential sources of error occur in such data collections. In addition, numbers vary widely between years due to the large population fluctuations. However, the total population of the Arctic fox must be in the order of several hundred thousand animals.

The world population of Arctic foxes is thus not endangered, but two Arctic fox subpopulations are. One is on Medny Island (Commander Islands, Russia), which was reduced by some 85–90%, to around 90 animals, as a result of mange caused by an ear tick introduced by dogs in the 1970s. The population is currently under treatment with antiparasitic drugs, but the result is still uncertain.

The other threatened population is the one in Fennoscandia (Norway, Sweden, Finland, and Kola Peninsula). This population decreased drastically around the start of the 20th century as a result of extreme fur prices, which caused severe hunting also during population lows. The population has remained at a low density for more than 90 years, with additional reductions during the last decade. The total population estimate for 1997 is around 60 adults in Sweden, 11 adults in Finland, and 50 in Norway. From Kola, there are indications of a similar situation, suggesting a population of around 20 adults. Even after local lemming peaks, the Arctic fox population tends to collapse back to levels dangerously close to nonviability. After the Felles Fjellrev conservation projects, the Fennoscandian population has increased to 400–500 individuals.

The Arctic fox is classed as a "prohibited new organism" under New Zealand's Hazardous Substances and New Organisms Act 1996, preventing it from being imported into the country.

== See also ==
- Arctic rabies virus
