= Glycolipid transfer protein =

Glycolipid transfer protein (GLTP)
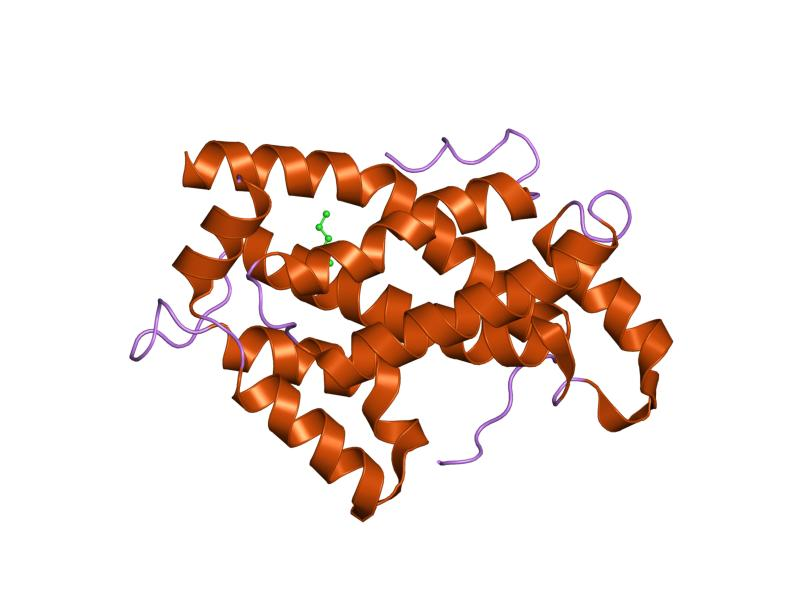

Identifiers
- Symbol: GLTP
- Pfam: PF08718
- InterPro: IPR014830
- OPM superfamily: 84
- OPM protein: 1swx
Available protein structures:
- PDB: IPR014830 PF08718 (ECOD; PDBsum)
- AlphaFold: IPR014830; PF08718

Glycolipid transfer protein is a cytosolic protein that catalyses the transfer of glycolipids between different intracellular membranes.

It was discovered by Raymond J. Metz and Norman S. Radin in 1980 and partially purified and characterized in 1982.

Recent reviews on structure and possible function are available.

This protein transports primarily different glycosphingolipids and glyceroglycolipids between intracellular membranes, but not phospholipids. It might be also involved in translocation of glucosylceramides. It was found in brain, kidney, spleen, lung, cerebellum, liver and heart.

== Human proteins containing this domain ==
GLTP; PLEKHA8; PLEKHA9;
