= Felles Fjellrev =

Arctic fox conservation projects

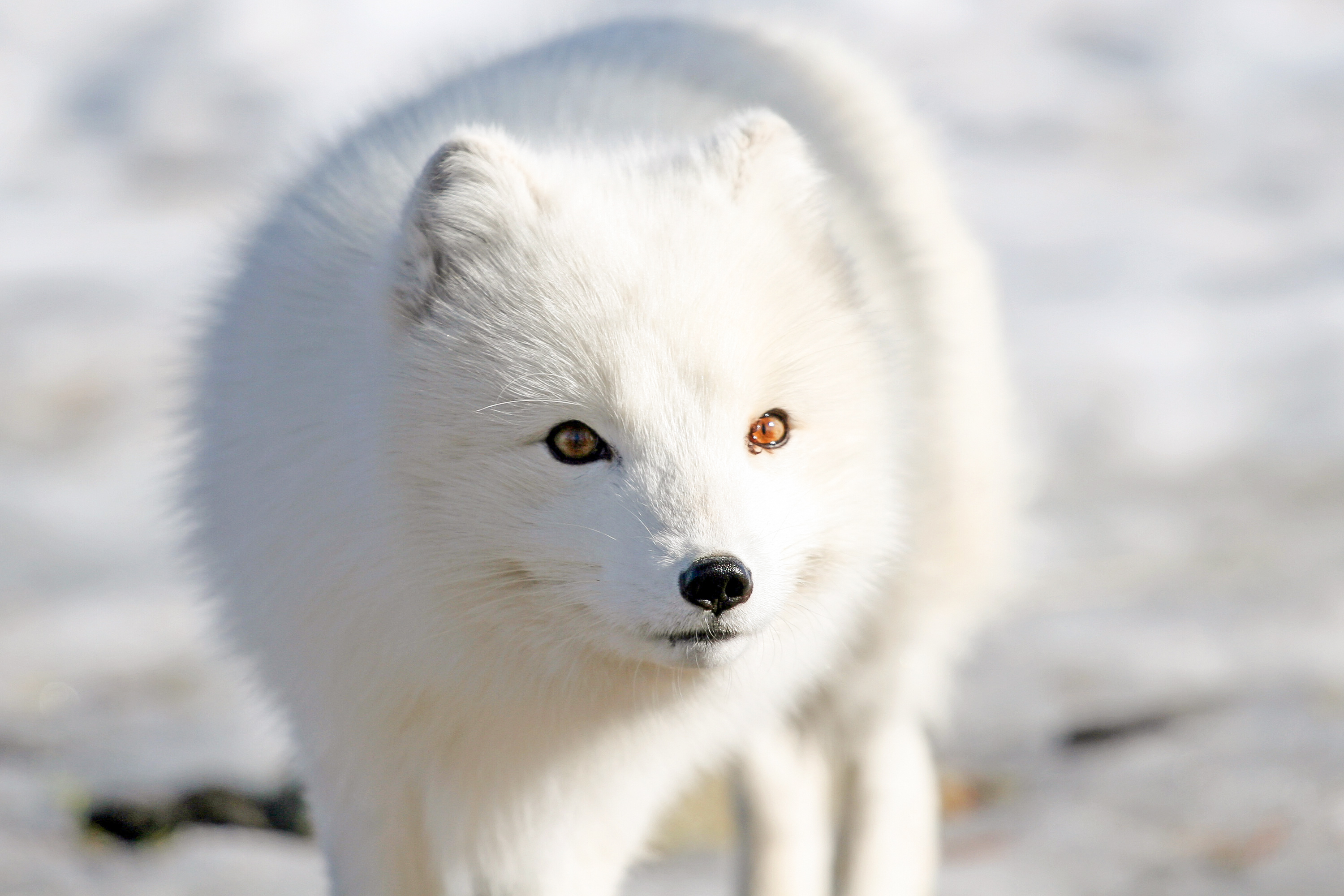
An Arctic fox in Norway.

Felles Fjellrev was a series of Norwegian–Swedish–Finnish conservation projects that ran from 2010 to 2026 to support the Arctic fox. The Fennoscandian population had been red-listed and considered critically endangered.

The initiative began in 2010 as a collaboration between Norway and Sweden and was expanded in 2017 to include Finland. In 2016, the project received new funding from the European Union.

The measures included releasing Arctic foxes into the wild, vaccinating Arctic fox cubs, supplementary feeding, and culling individuals of the much larger red fox, which threatened to displace the Arctic fox. The larger red fox can easily take over Arctic fox dens. The small population had also resulted in problems with inbreeding. All three countries also had their own national conservation measures for the Arctic fox; a Norwegian Arctic fox breeding facility is located in Oppdal.

The initiative ended in 2026 after the population in the project area had increased from 40–60 Arctic foxes around the turn of the millennium to 400–500 in 2026.
