= PLEKHA8 =

Protein-coding gene in the species Homo sapiens

Identifiers
- Aliases: PLEKHA8, FAPP2, pleckstrin homology domain containing A8
- External IDs: OMIM: 608639; MGI: 2681164; GeneCards: PLEKHA8

Gene location (Human)
Chr.	Chromosome 7 (human)
Band	7p14.3	Start	30,027,404 bp
Band	7p14.3	End	30,130,483 bp

Gene location (Mouse)
Chr.	Chromosome 6 (mouse)
Band	6|6 B3	Start	54,572,096 bp
Band	6|6 B3	End	54,622,824 bp
RNA expression pattern
Bgee	Human / Mouse (ortholog); Top expressed in: ventricular zone; placenta; ganglionic eminence; mucosa of ileum; bone marrow cell; testicle; visceral pleura; gonad; epithelium of colon; parietal pleura / Top expressed in: hand; secondary oocyte; zygote; primary oocyte; superior cervical ganglion; Gonadal ridge; abdominal wall; endocardial cushion; spermatocyte; vas deferens; More reference expression data
BioGPS	n/a
Gene ontology
Molecular function	phosphatidylinositol-4-phosphate binding; ceramide binding; lipid binding; glycolipid transfer activity; glycolipid binding; lipid transfer activity; ceramide 1-phosphate binding; ceramide 1-phosphate transfer activity
Cellular component	cytoplasm; trans-Golgi network; membrane; Golgi membrane; nucleoplasm; Golgi apparatus; cytosol
Biological process	protein transport; ER to Golgi ceramide transport; lipid transport; glycolipid transport; phosphatidylinositol biosynthetic process; intermembrane lipid transfer; ceramide transport; ceramide 1-phosphate transport
Sources:Amigo / QuickGO
Orthologs
Databases	NCBI: entry; OMA: entry
Species	Human	Mouse
Entrez	84725	231999
Ensembl	ENSG00000106086	ENSMUSG00000005225
UniProt	Q96JA3	Q80W71
RefSeq (mRNA)	NM_001197026; NM_001197027; NM_032639; NM_001350973; NM_001350974 NM_001350975; NM_001363473; NM_001363474	NM_001001335; NM_001164361
RefSeq (protein)	NP_001183955; NP_001183956; NP_116028; NP_001337902; NP_001337903 NP_001337904; NP_001350402; NP_001350403	NP_001001335; NP_001157833
Location (UCSC)	Chr 7: 30.03 – 30.13 Mb	Chr 6: 54.57 – 54.62 Mb
PubMed search
- Wikidata
View/Edit Human	View/Edit Mouse

Pleckstrin homology domain containing A8 is a protein that in humans is encoded by the PLEKHA8 gene.
