= YceI protein domain =

YceI
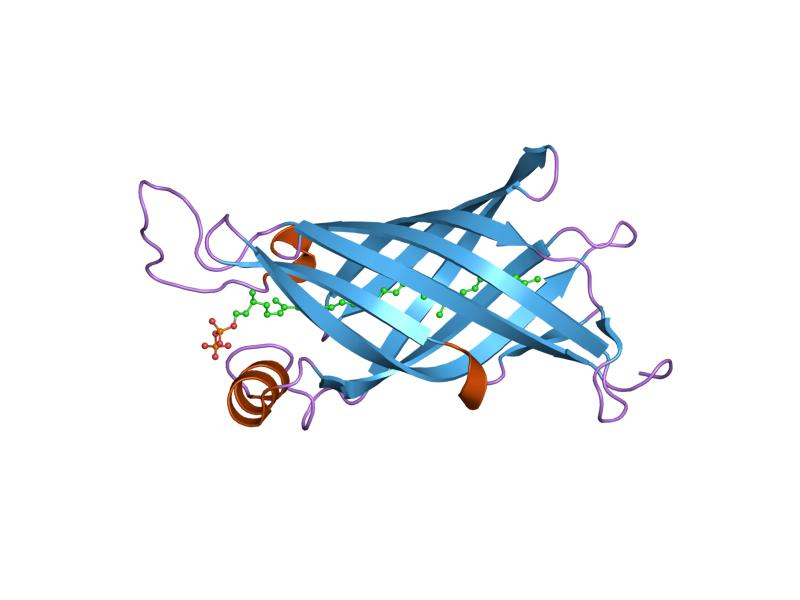
- Crystal structure of the polyisoprenoid-binding protein, TT1927B, from Thermus thermophilus hb8

Identifiers
- Symbol: YceI
- Pfam: PF04264
- InterPro: IPR007372
- SCOP2: 1uf6 / SCOPe / SUPFAM
- OPM superfamily: 101
- OPM protein: 3hpe
Available protein structures:
- PDB: IPR007372 PF04264 (ECOD; PDBsum)
- AlphaFold: IPR007372; PF04264

In molecular biology, Yce-I protein domain is a putative periplasmic protein. This entry represents the lipid-binding protein YceI from Escherichia coli and the polyisoprenoid-binding protein TTHA0802 from Thermus thermophilus. Its role is to help aid the biosynthesis of isoprenoid, an important molecule found in all living organisms.

== Structure ==
Both of these proteins share a common domain with an 8-stranded beta-barrel fold. This resembles the lipocalin fold, although no sequence homology exists with lipocalins. In TTHA0802, the protein binds the polyisoprenoid chain within the pore of the barrel via hydrophobic interactions. Sequence homologues of this core structure are present in a wide range of bacteria and archaea.

== Function ==
The crystal structures suggests that this family of proteins plays an important role in isoprenoid quinone metabolism or in transport or storage. In both cases, the protein is a homodimer, each monomer being characterized by a lipocalin fold.
