= GLTP =

Protein-coding gene in humans

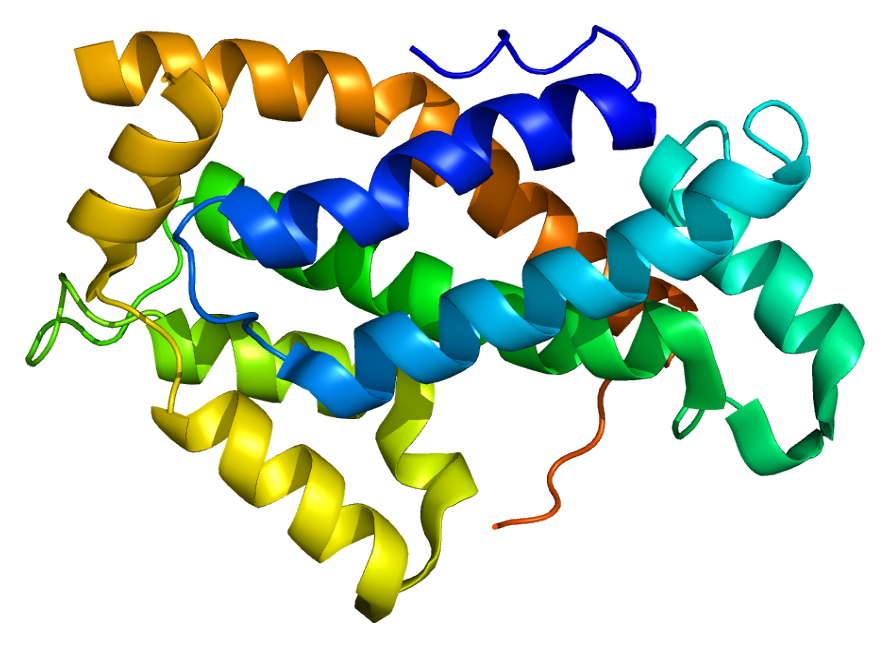

Identifiers
- Aliases: GLTP, glycolipid transfer protein
- External IDs: OMIM: 608949; MGI: 1929253; GeneCards: GLTP
Available structures
PDB	Ortholog search: PDBe RCSB
PDB	List of PDB id codes 1SWX, 1SX6, 2EUK, 2EUM, 2EVD, 2EVL, 2EVS, 2EVT, 3RIC, 3RWV, 3RZN, 3S0I, 3S0K, 4GH0, 4GHP, 4GHS, 4GIX, 4GJQ, 4GVT, 4GXD, 4GXG, 4H2Z

Gene location (Human)
Chr.	Chromosome 12 (human)
Band	12q24.11	Start	109,850,945 bp
Band	12q24.11	End	109,880,541 bp

Gene location (Mouse)
Chr.	Chromosome 5 (mouse)
Band	5|5 F	Start	114,807,459 bp
Band	5|5 F	End	114,829,045 bp
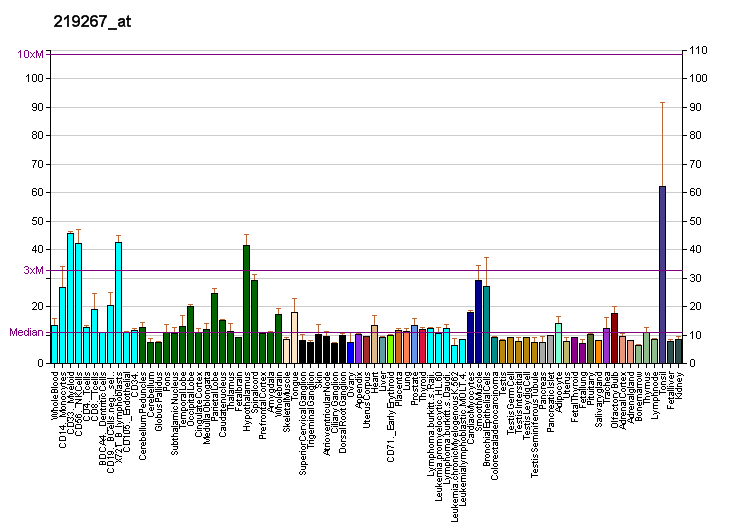
RNA expression pattern
Bgee	Human / Mouse (ortholog); Top expressed in: skin of arm; gingival epithelium; human penis; skin of thigh; vulva; mucosa of pharynx; oral cavity; skin of hip; nasal epithelium; mucosa of ileum / Top expressed in: skin of external ear; superior surface of tongue; epidermis; lip; transitional epithelium of urinary bladder; hair follicle; skin of back; esophagus; skin of abdomen; condyle; More reference expression data
BioGPS	More reference expression data
Gene ontology
Molecular function	protein binding; lipid binding; glycolipid transfer activity; glycolipid binding; lipid transfer activity; identical protein binding; ceramide 1-phosphate binding; ceramide 1-phosphate transfer activity
Cellular component	cytoplasm; cytosol; membrane
Biological process	lipid transport; glycosphingolipid metabolic process; glycolipid transport; intermembrane lipid transfer; ceramide transport; ceramide 1-phosphate transport
Sources:Amigo / QuickGO
Orthologs
Databases	NCBI: entry; OMA: entry
Species	Human	Mouse
Entrez	51228	56356
Ensembl	ENSG00000139433	ENSMUSG00000011884
UniProt	Q9NZD2	Q9JL62
RefSeq (mRNA)	NM_016433	NM_019821
RefSeq (protein)	NP_057517	NP_062795
Location (UCSC)	Chr 12: 109.85 – 109.88 Mb	Chr 5: 114.81 – 114.83 Mb
PubMed search
- Wikidata
View/Edit Human	View/Edit Mouse

Glycolipid transfer protein is a protein that in humans is encoded by the GLTP gene.

The protein encoded by this gene is similar to bovine and porcine proteins which accelerate transfer of certain glycosphingolipids and glyceroglycolipids between membranes. It is thought to be a cytoplasmic protein.
