= VPS25 =

Protein-coding gene in the species Homo sapiens

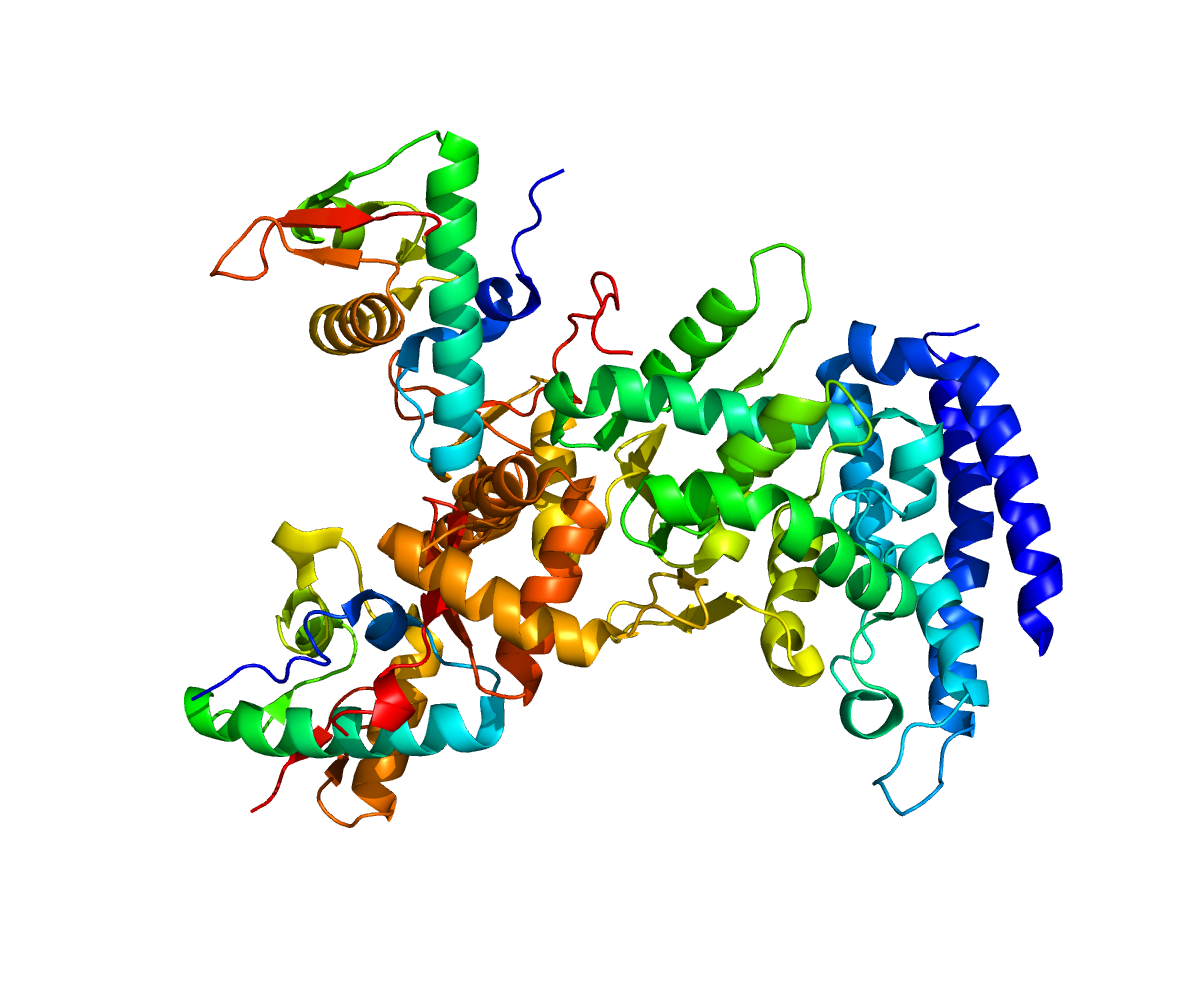

Identifiers
- Aliases: VPS25, DERP9, EAP20, FAP20, vacuolar protein sorting 25 homolog
- External IDs: OMIM: 610907; MGI: 106354; GeneCards: VPS25
Available structures
PDB	Ortholog search: PDBe RCSB
PDB	List of PDB id codes 2ZME, 3CUQ, 3HTU

Gene location (Human)
Chr.	Chromosome 17 (human)
Band	17q21.2	Start	42,773,449 bp
Band	17q21.2	End	42,779,599 bp

Gene location (Mouse)
Chr.	Chromosome 11 (mouse)
Band	11 D|11 64.48 cM	Start	101,144,533 bp
Band	11 D|11 64.48 cM	End	101,150,375 bp
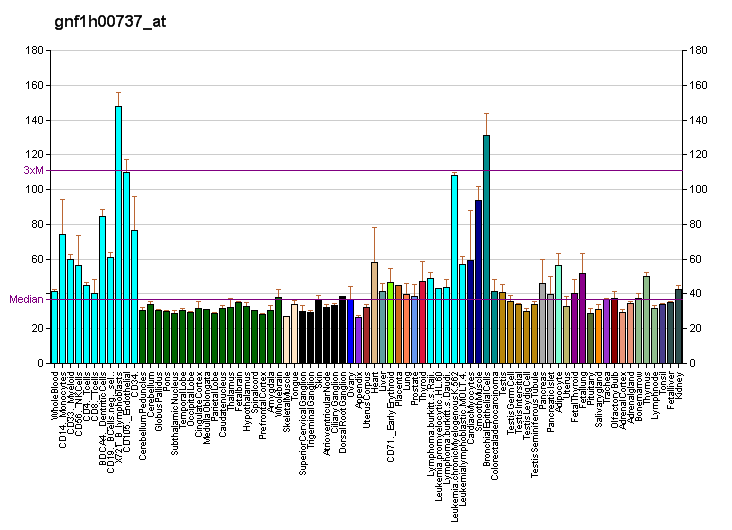
RNA expression pattern
Bgee	Human / Mouse (ortholog); Top expressed in: mucosa of transverse colon; rectum; islet of Langerhans; skin of arm; right uterine tube; mucosa of ileum; body of stomach; smooth muscle tissue; stromal cell of endometrium; olfactory zone of nasal mucosa / Top expressed in: yolk sac; tail of embryo; genital tubercle; right kidney; lip; embryo; embryo; granulocyte; muscle of thigh; blastocyst; More reference expression data
BioGPS	More reference expression data
Gene ontology
Molecular function	protein homodimerization activity; protein N-terminus binding; structural molecule activity; protein binding
Cellular component	cytoplasm; cytosol; endosome; membrane; nucleoplasm; endosome membrane; extracellular exosome; nucleus; ESCRT II complex
Biological process	regulation of transcription, DNA-templated; multivesicular body assembly; transcription, DNA-templated; endosomal transport; protein transport; protein transport to vacuole involved in ubiquitin-dependent protein catabolic process via the multivesicular body sorting pathway; macroautophagy; negative regulation of epidermal growth factor-activated receptor activity; transport; multivesicular body sorting pathway
Sources:Amigo / QuickGO
Orthologs
Databases	NCBI: entry; OMA: entry
Species	Human	Mouse
Entrez	84313	28084
Ensembl	ENSG00000131475	ENSMUSG00000078656
UniProt	Q9BRG1	Q9CQ80
RefSeq (mRNA)	NM_032353	NM_001284411; NM_001284412; NM_001284414; NM_026776
RefSeq (protein)	NP_115729; NP_115729.1	NP_001271340; NP_001271341; NP_001271343; NP_081052
Location (UCSC)	Chr 17: 42.77 – 42.78 Mb	Chr 11: 101.14 – 101.15 Mb
PubMed search
- Wikidata
View/Edit Human	View/Edit Mouse

ESCRT-II complex subunit
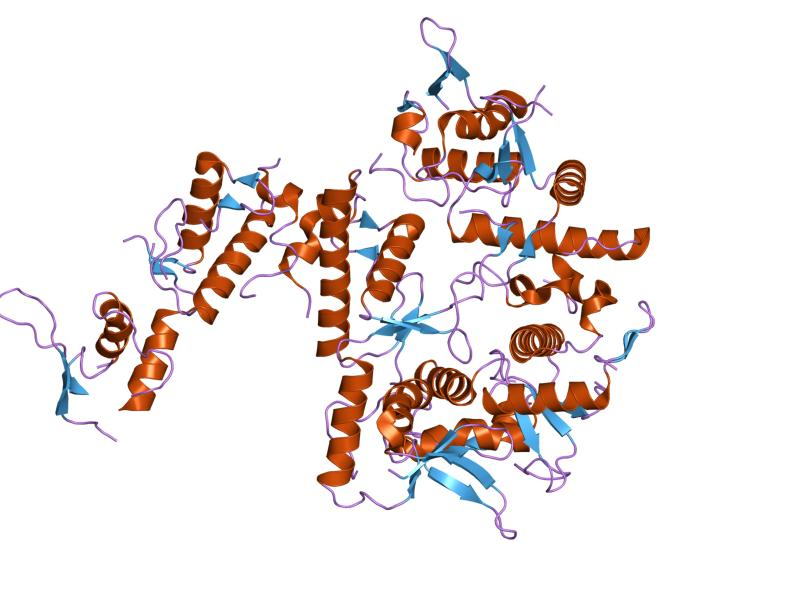
- crystal structure of subunit vps25 of the endosomal trafficking complex escrt-ii

Identifiers
- Symbol: ESCRT-II
- Pfam: PF05871
- InterPro: IPR008570
Available protein structures:
- PDB: IPR008570 PF05871 (ECOD; PDBsum)
- AlphaFold: IPR008570; PF05871

Vacuolar protein-sorting-associated protein 25 is a protein that in humans is encoded by the VPS25 gene.

It is a component of the endosome-associated complex ESCRT-II (Endosomal Sorting Complexes Required for Transport protein II). ESCRT (ESCRT-I, -II, -III) complexes orchestrate efficient sorting of ubiquitinated transmembrane receptors to lysosomes via multivesicular bodies (MVBs). ESCRT-II recruits the transport machinery for protein sorting at MVB. In addition, the human ESCRT-II has been shown to form a complex with RNA polymerase II elongation factor ELL in order to exert transcriptional control activity. ESCRT-II transiently associates with the endosomal membrane and thereby initiates the formation of ESCRT-III, a membrane-associated protein complex that functions immediately downstream of ESCRT-II during sorting of MVB cargo. ESCRT-II in turn functions downstream of ESCRT-I, a protein complex that binds to ubiquitinated endosomal cargo.

ESCRT-II is a trilobal complex composed of two copies of vps25, one copy of vps22 and the C-terminal region of vps36. The crystal structure of vps25 revealed two winged-helix domains, the N-terminal domain of vps25 interacting with vps22 and vps36.
