= ESCRT =

Protein pathway in cells

The endosomal sorting complexes required for transport (ESCRT) proteins are part of a pathway inside cells that helps sort and move other proteins. One of their main jobs is to form structures called multivesicular bodies (MVBs) which help sending of certain proteins, especially ones tagged for removal, to compartments in the cell called lysosomes where they get broken down.

The ESCRT system is made up of five separate cytosolic, peripheral membrane protein complexes, known as ESCRT-0, ESCRT-I, ESCRT-II, ESCRT-III and Vps4. Together with a number of accessory proteins, these ESCRT complexes enable a unique mode of membrane remodeling that results in membranes budding away from the cytoplasm. These ESCRT components have been isolated and studied in a number of organisms including yeast and humans.

The ESCRT machinery plays a vital role in a number of cellular processes including multivesicular body (MVB) biogenesis and cytokinetic abscission. Multivesicular body (MVB) biogenesis is a process in which ubiquitin-tagged proteins enter organelles called endosomes via the formation of vesicles. Cells break down damaged membrane proteins within two main complexes: the proteasome and the lysosome. A small tag called ubiquitin gets attached to them. The tag leads proteins to either the proteasome or the lysosome for destruction. For the lysosomal route the tagged proteins are sent into small compartments inside the cell called endosomes, specifically a kind called multivesicular bodies (MVBs), MVBs are made when part of the endosome membrane folds inward and forms intralumenal vesicles. These intraluminal vesicles carry the proteins meant to be destroyed, and when an MVB joins with a lysosome, the vesicles and the proteins inside get broken down.

When autophagy does not work well like in cells with ESCRT mutations the cell cannot get rid of clumps of damaged proteins very well. These protein clumps are commonly seen in neurodegenerative disease like Alzheimer's or Parkinson's.

Cytokinetic abscission is the process where the intercellular bridge (ICB) between two daughter cells is cut, completing cell division. In many animal cells, the ESCRT-III machinery is responsible for this process. The ICB is initially under high tension, which can prevent proper abscission in epithelial cells by interfering with the assembly of ESCRT-III.

== ESCRT complexes and accessory proteins ==
The ESCRT system is like a team of cellular machines of ESCRT protein complexes and accessory proteins that help manage and remodel cell membranes.

The ESCRT complexes are needed for membrane-cutting events in the cell: MVBs (Multivesicular Bodies) are used to sort and recycle cell component, then viruses like HIV-1 bud off from the cell, and during the final steps of cell division (cytokinesis) when two cells physically separate.

Even though all these processes involve similar types of membrane shaping, they don't all need the same ESCRT complexes, For example the ESCRT-II complex is not needed for HIV-1 to bud from the cell and its exact role in cytokinesis is still unclear.

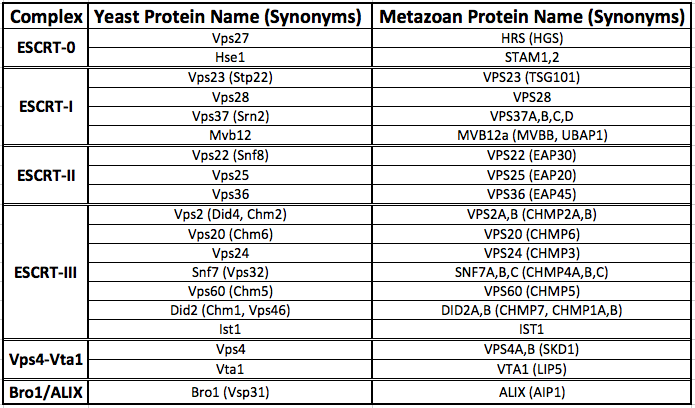
Summary of ESCRT machinery and accessory proteins.

Each of the ESCRT complexes and accessory proteins has unique structures that enable distinct biochemical functions. A number of synonyms exist for each protein component of the ESCRT machinery, both for yeast and metazoans.

A summary table of all of these proteins is provided at the table beside.

== ESCRT-0 ==
The ESCRT-0 complex plays a vital role in the generation of multivesicular bodies by binding and clustering ubiquitinated proteins and/or receptors on the surface of a cell. The complex is then responsible for binding to a lipid on the endosomal membrane, which recruits these tagged proteins to the endosome. Once properly localized, these proteins are then taken into the endosome via vesicles, forming multivesicular bodies, and are eventually delivered to the lysosome where they are degraded. This process is essential as it is the major pathway for the degradation of damaged proteins that have passed through the Golgi. The components of the ESCRT-0 complex exist as follows:

The complex is a 1:1 heterodimer of Vps27 (vacuolar protein sorting protein 27) and Hse1. Vps27 and Hse1 dimerize through antiparallel coiled-coil GAT (so named after proteins GGA and Tom1) domains. Both Vps27 and Hse1 contain an amino-terminal VHS domain (so named because it is contained in Vps27, HRS, and STAM proteins). These VHS domains bind the ubiquitin on proteins the cell aims to degrade. Ubiquitin can also associate with ubiquitin interacting motifs such as the one on Hse1 or the double-sided domain found on Vps27. A FYVE domain (named after the four proteins in which it was initially identified: Fab1p, YOTB, Vac1, and EEA1) is found sandwiched between the VHS and ubiquitin interacting motif domains of Vps27. Phosphatidylinositol 3-phosphate, a common endosomal lipid, binds to this FYVE domain resulting in the recruitment of ESCRT-0 to the endosome. Research has made comprehensive analysis of the interaction between the ESCRT-0 complex and ubiquitin using isothermal titration calorimetry, this technique has been used for measures molecular binding strength. Research shows five main results:

1. Ubiquitin Binding Behavior: Binding to the different ubiquitin-binding domains (UBDs) within ESCRT-0 is non-cooperative, meaning each domain interacts with ubiquitin independently.
2. Binding Affinity: The Hrs subunit contains a double ubiquitin interacting motif (DUIM). This DUIM has a binding affinity more than as twice as strong as the UBDs found in the STAM subunit and this indicates that Hrs in the primary ubiquitin binding protein within the ESCRT-0 complex.
3. Localization in the Cell (In Vivo): Both Hrs and STAM are found on endosomal membranes.
4. Complex Formation: By using atomic force microscopy, researchers observed that ESCRT-0 mainly forms: Heterodimers (one Hrs + one STAM). Heterotetramers (likely two of each) in the presence of lipid membranes. Hydrodynamic analysis of ESCRT-0 inside cells confirmed that it primarily exists as a heterotetramer
5. Updated Functional Model: based on these results, the researchers proposed a revised model where ESCRT-0 plays a central role in recruiting and concentrating ubiquitinated cargo at the endosome for degradation.

== ESCRT-I ==
The role of the ESCRT-I complex is to assist in the generation of multivesicular bodies by clustering ubiquitinated proteins and acting as a bridge between the ESCRT-0 and ESCRT-II complexes. It also plays a role in membrane recognition and remodeling during membrane abscission by forming rings on either side of the midbody in dividing cells. ESCRT-I is also responsible for recruiting ESCRT-III, which forms the constriction zone just before the cells separate. Furthermore, ESCRT-I contributes to viral budding by interacting with specific viral proteins, leading to the recruitment of additional ESCRT machinery to the potential site of viral release.

The ESCRT-I complex is a heterotetramer (1:1:1:1) composed of Vps23, Vps28, Vps37, and Mvb12. The assembled heterotetramer appears as a rod-shaped stalk formed by Vps23, Vps37, and Mvb12 with a fanned cap composed of single helices from Vps23, Vps28, and Vps37. Vps23 contains a ubiquitin E2 variant domain, which is responsible for binding of ubiquitin, the ESCRT-0 complex, and to the PTAP (proline, threonine, alanine, proline) motif of viral Gag proteins. Immediately following this domain is a proline-rich motif (GPPX₃Y), which directs ESCRT-I to the midbody during membrane abscission. Mvb12 can also bind ubiquitin via its carboxy-terminus. Vps28 facilitates the interaction between ESCRT-I and ESCRT-II by associating with the GLUE domain (GRAM-Like Ubiquitin-binding in EAP45) of Vps36 through its carboxy-terminal four-helix bundle domain.

Finally, the ESCRT-I complex co-assembles with ESCRT-II on membranes to form a 1:1 supercomplex that facilitates the budding of the limiting membrane of the multivesicular body (MVB) into its lumen. Interestingly, in processes such as HIV-1 budding and cytokinesis where ESCRT machinery is not required for bud formation. ESCRT-I appears to function independently of ESCRT-II and is likely involved mainly in recruiting ESCRT-III. Structurally, ESCRT-I subunits heterotetramerize through two contiguous but distinct core regions. Vps23, Vps37, and Mvb12 form a 13 nm-long stalk that includes an unusual antiparallel coiled-coil structure. Meanwhile, Vps23, Vps28, and Vps37 contribute to a headpiece region composed of three pairs of antiparallel helices, arranged in a fan-like shape. Together, the stalk and headpiece form a single rigid structure approximately 18 nm in length.

== ESCRT-II ==
The ESCRT-II complex plays a more critical role that ESCRT-I in multivesicular body (MVB) biogenesis, as its overexpression can rescue the loss of ESCRT-I function in yeast, whereas the reverse is not true. Despite its central function in MVB formation and membrane budding, ESCRT is not essential for HIV-1 budding or cytokinesis. Unlike ESCRT-0 and ESCRT-I, ESCRT-II binds ubiquitinated cargo at a single site and acts as a key bridging complex between the upstream ESCRT machinery (ESCRT-0 and -I) and the downstream ESCRT-III complex, which performs membrane scission. ESCRT-II may also be involved in linking MVBs to microtubules through interactions with RILP, Rab7, and dynein motor proteins.

Structurally, ESCRT-II forms a Y-shaped complex, with Vps22 and Vps36 at the base and two Vps25 subunits as the arms. Vps22 and Vps36 interact tightly through their winged-helix (WH) domains and are mutually required for folding and stability, while the Vps25 subunits are more loosely attached and do not interact with each other. The second WH domain of Vps25 mediates interaction with the ESCRT-III subunit Vps20, and both Vps25 mediates interaction with the ESCRT-III subunit Vps20, and both Vps25 copies are essential for proper function.

Additionally, the N-terminus of Vps22 contains a basic helix that aids in membrane targeting without lipid specificity, In yeast, Vps36 features a GLUE domain containing two inserted NpI4 Zinc fingers (NZF1 and NZF2), which mediate binding to the Vps28 subunit of ESCRT-I and to ubiquitin, respectively. In mammals, the GLUE domain of VPS36 lacks these zinc fingers but can bind ubiquitin directly. Furthermore, the linker region between the GLUE and WH1 domains of yeast Vps36 may serve as a secondary binding site for ESCRT-I, a region that is conserved in the human homolog, although its role remains unconfirmed.

The ESCRT-II complex functions primarily during the biogenesis of multivesicular bodies and the delivery of ubiquitin tagged proteins to the endosome. Ubiquitin-tagged proteins are transferred sequentially from ESCRT-0 to ESCRT-I and then to ESCRT-II. ESCRT-II associates with ESCRT-III, which pinches off the cargo containing vesicle. The specific aspects of ESCRT-II are as follows:

ESCRT-II is a heterotetramer (2:1:1) composed of two Vps25 subunits, one Vps22 subunit, and one Vps36 subunit. Vps25 molecules contain PPXY motifs, which bind to winged-helix (WH) motifs of Vps22 and Vps36 forming a Y-shaped complex with Vps22 and Vps36 at the base and the Vps25 subunits forming the arms. Vps25 molecules also contain WH motifs that mediate the interaction between ESCRT-II and ESCRT-III. Vps36 includes a GLUE domain that binds phosphatidylinositol 3-phosphate and Vps28 subunit of ESCRT-I. Two zinc finger domains are looped into the GLUE domain of yeast Vps36. One of these zinc finger domains binds the carboxy-terminal domain of Vps28 while the other interacts with ubiquitin.

== ESCRT-III ==
The ESCRT-III complex is unique among ESCRT components in several ways. Unlike ESCRT complexes 0–II, ESCRT-III subunits do not contain any known ubiquitin-binding domains. These subunits exist in the cytosol as inactive monomers or possibly as heterodimers and only polymerize into the active ESCRT-III complex upon membrane association. Once assembled, this complex becomes detergent-insoluble and is relatively resistant to conventional biochemical methods.

In Archaea, only homologs of ESCRT-III and Vps4 are found, where they participate in cell division indicating an evolutionarily conserved core function.

In yeast, the core functional subunits of ESCRT-III are Vps20, Snf7, Vps24 and Vps2, which assemble sequentially in the specific order. Vps20, Snf7, and Vps24 are sufficient for membrane scission, while Vps2 is essential for coupling the complex to the Vps4 recycling machinery. Additional yeast subunits Did2, Ist1, and Vps60 are nonessential but participate in later stages. Did2 and Vps60 help recruit and activate the Vps4–Vta1 complex for subunit recycling, whereas Ist1 inhibits Vps4 activity.

Certain subunits form preferential binary pairings: Vps20 with Snf7, Vps24 with Vps2, and Did2 with Ist1. Vps60, however, is an exception and binds more tightly to Vta1 than to other ESCRT-III proteins. The stoichiometry of ESCRT-III assembly is not well defined. In yeast, Snf7 is the most abundant subunit, present at several-fold higher levels compared to others. Notably, Snf7 alone or combinations like Vps24 + Vps2 or Ist1 + Did2 can form helical tubes similar in size to the necks of budding HIV-1 particles or the intralumenal vesicles (ILVs) of multivesicular bodies (MVBs).

ESCRT-III is likely the most critical component of the ESCRT machinery, as it participates in all ESCRT-mediated processes. During membrane abscission and viral budding, ESCRT-III forms long filaments that coil around the site of membrane constriction just before membrane cleavage. This function is mediated through interactions with the centralspindlin complex. These filamentous structures also act as a ring-like fence during MVB formation, preventing cargo proteins from leaking into the cytosol.

Unlike other ESCRT components, ESCRT-III exists only transiently and includes both essential and nonessential subunits. The essential subunits must assemble in the order Vps20, Snf7, Vps24, and then Vps2 for proper function. Vps20 nucleates Snf7 polymer formation, followed by Vps24 capping the complex and recruiting Vps2. Vps2 then brings the AAA-ATPase Vps4 to the complex.

In their free cytosolic state, ESCRT-III subunits are "closed," with their C-terminal regions folding back onto themselves in an autoinhibitory manner that stabilizes the monomers. Most essential and nonessential ESCRT-III subunits contain MIT-interacting motifs (MIMs) at their carboxy-terminus, enabling them to bind Vps4 and the AAA-ATPase spastin.

The ESCRT-III complex is likely the most important component of the ESCRT machinery because it plays a role in all ESCRT-mediated processes. During membrane abscission and viral budding, ESCRT-III forms long filaments that coil around the site of membrane constriction just prior to membrane cleavage. This mediation of abscission occurs through interactions with the centralspindlin complex. These filamentous structures are also present during multivesicular body formation and function as a ring-like fence that plugs the budding vesicle to prevent cargo proteins from escaping into the cell's cytosol. ESCRT-III exists and functions as follows:

The ESCRT-III complex differs from all other ESCRT machinery in that it exists only transiently and contains both essential and nonessential components. The essential subunits must assemble in the proper order (Vps20, Snf7, Vps24, then Vps2) for the machinery to function. Nonessential subunits include Vps60, Did2, and Ist1. Vps20 initiates assembly of ESCRT-III by acting as a nucleator of Snf7 polymer assembly. Vps24 then associates with Snf7 to cap the complex and recruit Vps2. Vps2 then brings Vps4 to the complex. All "free" cytosolic forms of each subunit are considered closed. That is the carboxy-terminal portion of each subunit folds up onto itself in an autoinhibitory manner stabilizing the monomeric subunits. The carboxy-terminus of most ESCRT-III subunits, both essential and nonessential, contain MIMs (MIT (microtubule interacting and transport domain) interacting motif) motifs. These motifs are responsible for binding Vps4 and the AAA-ATPase spastin.

== Vps4-Vta1 ==
Vps4 is an essential protein in eukaryotic cells, playing a pivotal role in the disassembly of the ESCRT-III complex—a process crucial for various cellular functions such as multivesicular body biogenesis, cytokinesis, and viral budding. To fulfill these roles, Vps4 comprises several distinct domains, each with specific functions.

The N-terminal MIT domain (Microtubule Interacting and Trafficking) is responsible for binding to ESCRT-III subunits by interacting with MIM sequences (MIT Interacting Motifs) present in these subunits. This domain is essential for recruiting Vps4 to sites where the ESCRT-III complex needs to be disassembled. Following the MIT domain is a flexible linker of approximately 40 amino acids, connecting it to the central AAA-ATPase cassette. This cassette consists of a large AAA-ATPase domain with a mix of α-helices and β-strands, and a small AAA-ATPase domain primarily composed of α-helices. Within the small AAA-ATPase domain lies an inserted β-domain, which is crucial for interaction with the cofactor Vta1. The C-terminal region of Vps4 contains a unique helix that also contributes to the protein's function.

Vta1 acts as a cofactor for Vps4 and is necessary for its optimal activity. The protein comprises two N-terminal MIT domains that mediate binding to ESCRT-III subunits, particularly Vps60 and Did2. These interactions are vital for Vta1's role in stimulating Vps4's activity. A flexible linker connects the MIT domains to the C-terminal VSL domain (Vps4, SBP1, LIP5), which enables Vta1 dimerization and is essential for binding to Vps4. Through this binding, Vta1 promotes the formation of the Vps4 dodecamer and enhances its ATPase activity, which is crucial for the efficient disassembly of the ESCRT-III complex.

In the figure beside; (A) Electron density calculated from a 2Fo-Fc synthesis in which the residues shown in orange were omitted. Density is contoured at 1 s.(B) Ribbon model for the 1:1 complex in the asymmetric unit. (C) Interaction of Vta1 with the molecular surface of Vps4, with the latter colored by atom type (carbon, green; oxygen, red; nitrogen, blue). The interaction between Vps4 and Vta1 is therefore critical for regulating ESCRT-III dynamics. The MIT domain in Vps4 ensures proper localization by binding to ESCRT-III subunits, while the AAA-ATPase domain drives the energy-dependent process of disassembling the complex. Vta1 amplifies this process by stabilizing Vps4's oligomeric form and increasing its enzymatic activity, ensuring efficient recycling of ESCRT components for repeated use in the cell.

== Structure and function of Bro1 in endosomal sorting ==
The regulation of the endosomal sorting pathway relies heavily on Bro1, which effectively recruits deubiquitinases to the ESCRT-III complex. This recruitment enables the removal of ubiquitin tags from proteins destined for lysosomal degradation, just before the formation of multivesicular bodies (MVBs). Bro1 also helps stabilize the ESCRT-III complex during this process.

Bro1 contains a Bro1 domain that binds to Snf7, the main structural subunit of the ESCRT-III complex. Through this interaction, Bro1 is localized to sites of endosomal membrane abscission. Doa4, a deubiquitinase, is also recruited to the same site via its interaction with Bro1. Doa4 removes ubiquitin from cargo proteins before their delivery to the lysosome. Alix, the mammalian homolog of Bro1, along with other late endosomal proteins, contains a conserved Bro1 domain of approximately 160 residues. Structural studies have revealed that the Bro1 domain in yeast is composed of a folded core of 367 residues. This extended domain is both necessary and sufficient for binding to Snf7 and for Bro1's localization to late endosomes.

Structurally, the Bro1 domain resembles a boomerang with a filled-in concave face and includes three tetratricopeptide repeat (TPR) subdomains. Snf7 binds to a conserved hydrophobic patch on Bro1—an interaction essential for complex formation and correct sorting of cargo proteins. These findings highlight a conserved mechanism by which Bro1 domain-containing proteins are targeted to endosomal membranes via interaction with Snf7 and its orthologs.

In the figure Beside can we see (A) Electron density from MAD map contoured at 1.0 σ.(B and C) Two views of the overall structure. The N-terminal region is colored cyan; the N-terminal (non-TPR) portion of the helical solenoid is colored green; the β sheet is colored yellow; the TPR domain is colored magenta; and the C-terminal region is colored orange.

== Multivesicular body biogenesis and cargo shuttling ==
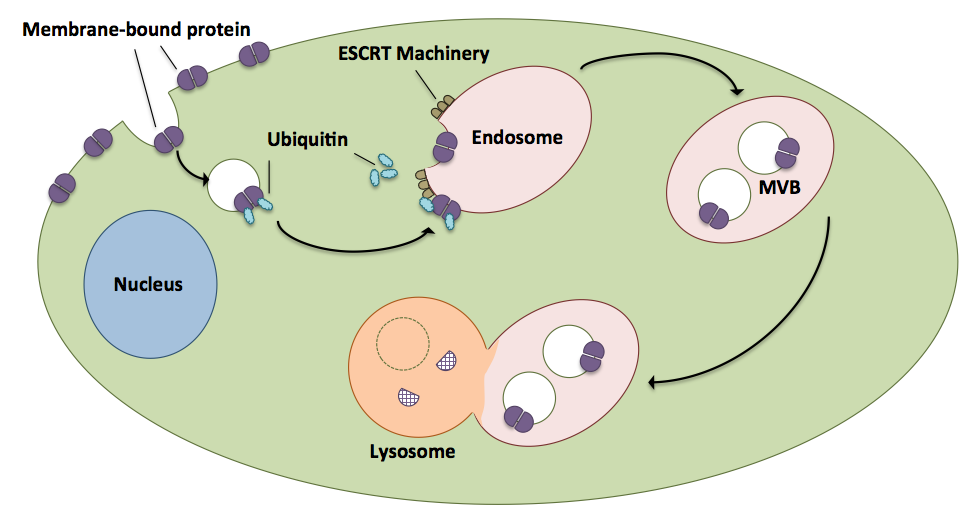
Trafficking of membrane bound proteins to the lysosome using ESCRT machinery. Membrane bound proteins are taken into the cell via endocytosis. Ubiquitin tags on the protein are recognized by ESCRT machinery and recruited to the endosome. Multivesicular bodies are formed, which then fuse with the lysosome where these proteins are degraded. Adapted from.

Multivesicular bodies play a large role in the transport of ubiquitinated proteins and receptors to a lysosome. ESCRT complexes transport ubiquitinated cargo to cellular vesicles that bud directly into the cell's endosomal compartment, forming multivesicular bodies. These multivesicular bodies eventually fuse with the lysosome causing degradation of the cargo. A more in-depth description of the process, including associated machinery, exists as follows:

1. ESCRT-0 components Vps27 and Hse1 each bind to ubiquitinated cargo.
2. Vps27 binds to phosphatidylinositol 3-phosphate, an endosomal lipid, which then recruits the entire complex to an endosome.
3. Vps27 binds the Vps23 subunit of ESCRT-I, bringing ESCRT-I to the endosome. ESCRT-I can also bind ubiquitinated proteins.
4. Vps36 associates with ESCRT-I subunit Vps28, resulting in the recruitment of the ESCRT-II complex.
5. Vps25 subunit of ESCRT-II binds to and activates Vps20 of the ESCRT-III complex.
6. Vps20 nucleates the formation of Snf7 strands that are then capped by Vps24.
7. Vps24 recruits Vps2, which brings Vps4 to the complex.
8. Vps4 forms a pore made of two hexameric rings upon which Vta1 binds. This Vps4-Vta1 complex triggers the disassembly of ESCRT-III and marks the end of multivesicular body formation.

== Membrane abscission ==
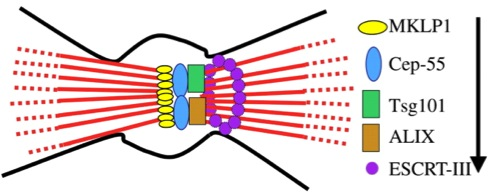
Recruitment of ESCRT Complexes to the Midbody. Cep-55 binds MKLP1. Cep-55 recruits ESCRT-I and ALIX. ESCRT-I and ALIX recruit ESCRT-III. ESCRT-III forms spiral around membrane neck between daughter cells leading to constriction and cleavage. Adapted from.

Membrane abscission during cytokinesis is the process by which the membrane connecting two daughter cells is cleaved during cell division. Since it is conserved in a number of archaea, membrane abscission is considered to be the earliest role for ESCRT machinery. The process begins when the centrosomal protein Cep55 is recruited to the midbody of dividing cells in association with MKLP1, a mitotic kinesin-like protein that associates with microtubules. Cep55 then recruits the Vps23 subunit of ESCRT-I and accessory protein ALIX, which form into rings on either side of the midbody. ESCRT-I and ALIX recruit ESCRT-III via its Snf7 subunit. ESCRT-III subunits Vps20, Snf7, Vps24, Vps2, and Did2 assemble into a spiral-shaped filament that encircles cargo and drives membrane scission. These structures form independently of the ESCRT-I subunit Vps23. The formation of this spiral-like structure deforms the membrane and the AAA-ATPase spastin is brought in by Did2 and Ist1 to cleave the microtubules formed at the midbody. Vps4 then catalyzes the disassembly of the ESCRT-III complex resulting in two newly separated daughter cells. The process of membrane abscission was described using metazoan proteins as the process has been studied to a greater extent in metazoans.

== Viral budding ==
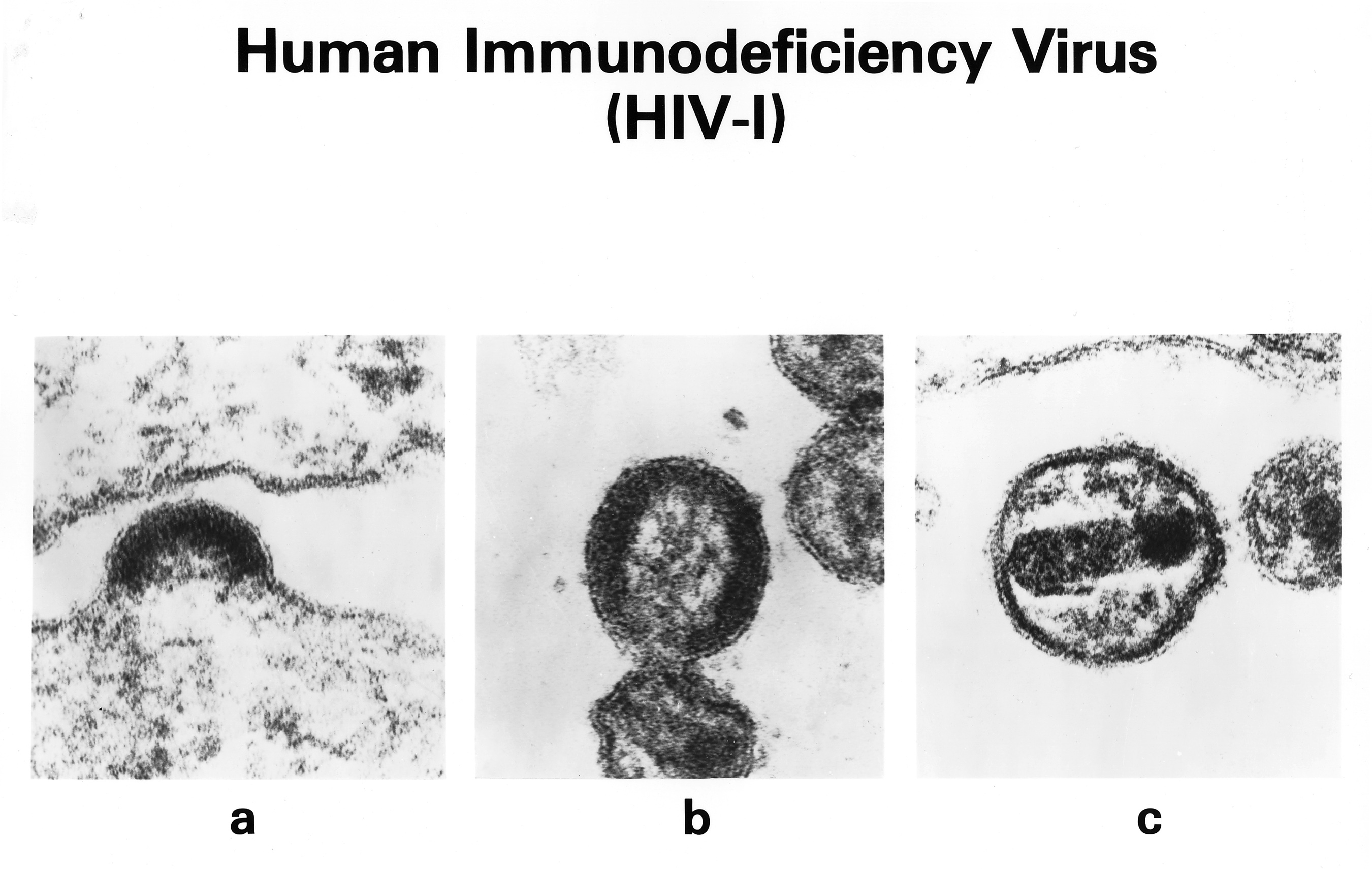
Retroviral budding of HIV. A) Accumulation of viral proteins under the cell membrane causes the virus to protrude outward. B) A constriction is formed by the ESCRT complexes at the base of membrane protrusion causing formation of a virus containing vesicle. C) The bud pinches off leaving a free extracellular virion.

During viral budding, free virions escape from cells by hijacking the host cell's ESCRT machinery. Retroviruses, including HIV-1 and human T-lymphotropic virus, as well as enveloped viruses like the Ebola virus, rely on the ESCRT system to exit host cells. Viral Gag proteins, which are the primary structural components of retroviral coats, initiate the process by interacting with both TSG101 of the ESCRT-I complex and the accessory protein ALIX. ESCRT-III subunits, including the essential components CHMP4 and CHMP2, are recruited to the budding site, where they constrict and sever the neck of the bud in a manner similar to membrane abscission during cell division.

Afterward, Vps4 recycles the ESCRT-III subunits and returns them to the cytosol, enabling the release of the virus from the cell. This viral budding process depends on metazoan proteins, as most research on viral release has been conducted in metazoan organisms.

=== Virus-encoded ESCRT ===
Most enveloped viruses hijack the host ESCRT machinery for envelopment and budding. However, certain groups of large DNA viruses were found to encode their own components of the ESCRT system. In particular, ESCRT-III is broadly conserved in mirusviruses, herpes-like viruses infecting protists, and occasionally in viruses of the phylum Nucleocytoviricota. A subset of mirusviruses was also found to encode homologs of the Vps4 ATPase as well as Vps55 and Vps68. The viral ESCRT-III genes were found to be transcribed and in the case of the only experimentally characterized mirusvirus also translated during infection. The conservation of ESCRT genes in mirusviruses suggests autonomous membrane remodeling during envelopment of these viruses.
