= LRSAM1 =

Protein-coding gene in the species Homo sapiens

Identifiers
- Aliases: LRSAM1, CMT2P, RIFLE, TAL, leucine rich repeat and sterile alpha motif containing 1
- External IDs: OMIM: 610933; MGI: 2684789; GeneCards: LRSAM1
Enzyme activity
EC #	BRENDA	ExPASy	KEGG	MetaCyc
2.3.2.27	↗	↗	↗	↗

Gene location (Human)
Chr.	Chromosome 9 (human)
Band	9q33.3-q34.11	Start	127,451,489 bp
Band	9q33.3-q34.11	End	127,503,499 bp

Gene location (Mouse)
Chr.	Chromosome 2 (mouse)
Band	2|2 B	Start	32,815,228 bp
Band	2|2 B	End	32,851,626 bp
RNA expression pattern
Bgee	Human / Mouse (ortholog); Top expressed in: apex of heart; sural nerve; skin of leg; skin of abdomen; left ventricle; right hemisphere of cerebellum; right frontal lobe; muscle layer of sigmoid colon; anterior cingulate cortex; Brodmann area 9 / Top expressed in: hypothalamus; granulocyte; placenta; white adipose tissue; neural layer of retina; cerebellar cortex; quadriceps femoris muscle; skeletal muscle tissue; olfactory bulb; mesencephalon; More reference expression data
BioGPS	n/a
Gene ontology
Molecular function	ubiquitin protein ligase activity; metal ion binding; ubiquitin-protein transferase activity; protein binding; transferase activity; volume-sensitive anion channel activity
Cellular component	cytoplasm; membrane; cytosol; plasma membrane; ion channel complex
Biological process	negative regulation of endocytosis; positive regulation of autophagosome assembly; protein polyubiquitination; positive regulation of xenophagy; viral budding; autophagy; protein catabolic process; protein ubiquitination; protein transport; ubiquitin-dependent endocytosis; protein autoubiquitination; signal transduction; anion transmembrane transport; inorganic anion transport
Sources:Amigo / QuickGO
Orthologs
Databases	NCBI: entry; OMA: entry
Species	Human	Mouse
Entrez	90678	227738
Ensembl	ENSG00000148356	ENSMUSG00000026792
UniProt	Q6UWE0	Q80ZI6
RefSeq (mRNA)	NM_001005373; NM_001005374; NM_001190723; NM_138361; NM_001384142 NM_001384143; NM_001384144	NM_199302; NM_001379439; NM_001379440; NM_001379441; NM_001379442 NM_001379443
RefSeq (protein)	NP_001005373; NP_001005374; NP_001177652; NP_612370; NP_001371071 NP_001371072; NP_001371073	NP_955006; NP_001366368; NP_001366369; NP_001366370; NP_001366371 NP_001366372
Location (UCSC)	Chr 9: 127.45 – 127.5 Mb	Chr 2: 32.82 – 32.85 Mb
PubMed search
- Wikidata
View/Edit Human	View/Edit Mouse

E3 ubiquitin-protein ligase LRSAM1, previously known as Tsg101-associated ligase (Tal), is an enzyme that in humans is encoded by the LRSAM1 gene.

== Clinical significance ==
Mutations in LRSAM1 have been reported in the peripheral neuropathy Charcot-Marie-Tooth type 2P (OMIM 614436), while disruption of the mouse Lrsam1 gene has been shown to sensitize peripheral axons to acrylamide-induced degeneration.

== Interactions ==
LRSAM1 has been shown to interact with TSG101.
