= TSG101 =

Protein-coding gene in the species Homo sapiens

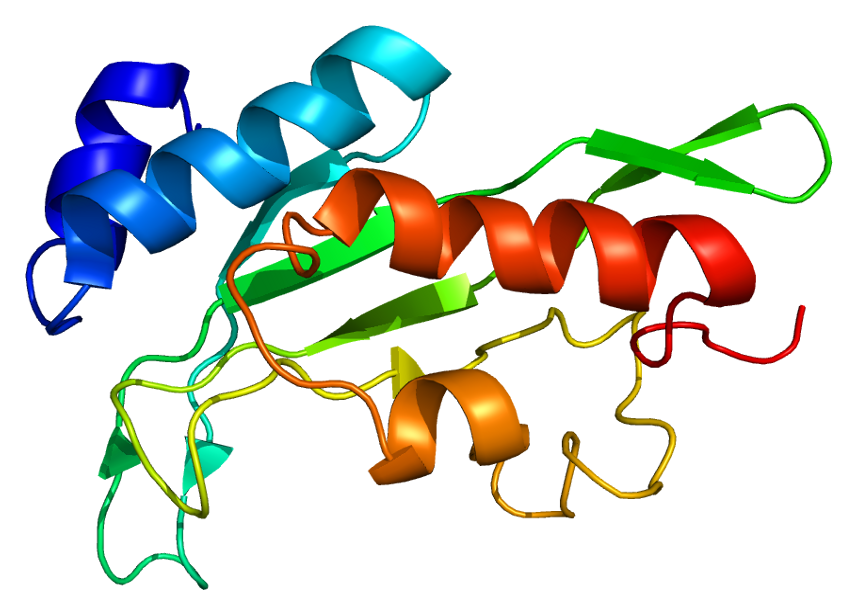

Identifiers
- Aliases: TSG101, TSG10, VPS23, tumor susceptibility 101
- External IDs: OMIM: 601387; MGI: 106581; GeneCards: TSG101
Available structures
PDB	Ortholog search: PDBe RCSB
PDB	List of PDB id codes 1KPP, 1KPQ, 1M4P, 1M4Q, 1S1Q, 2F0R, 3IV1, 3OBQ, 3OBS, 3OBU, 3OBX, 3P9G, 3P9H, 4EJE, 4YC1, 4ZNY

Gene location (Human)
Chr.	Chromosome 11 (human)
Band	11p15.1	Start	18,468,336 bp
Band	11p15.1	End	18,526,951 bp

Gene location (Mouse)
Chr.	Chromosome 7 (mouse)
Band	7|7 B3	Start	46,538,697 bp
Band	7|7 B3	End	46,569,717 bp
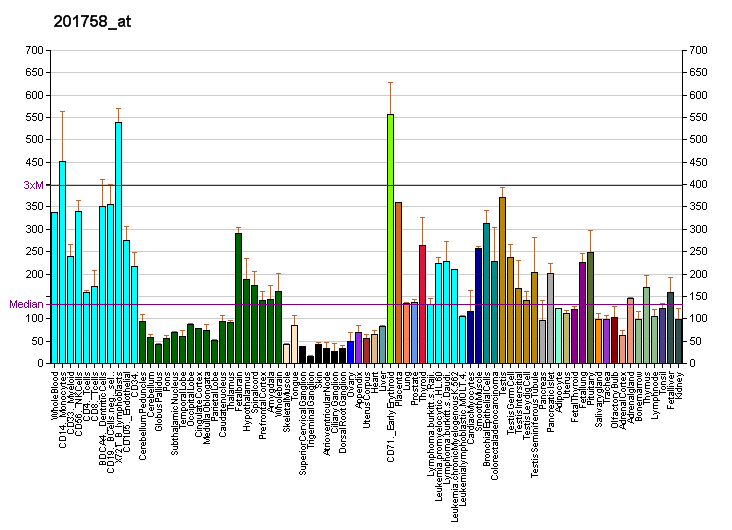
RNA expression pattern
Bgee	Human / Mouse (ortholog); Top expressed in: oocyte; secondary oocyte; gonad; ganglionic eminence; islet of Langerhans; amniotic fluid; gingival epithelium; gastrocnemius muscle; rectum; parotid gland / Top expressed in: tail of embryo; ganglionic eminence; ventricular zone; genital tubercle; maxillary prominence; mandibular prominence; neural tube; medial ganglionic eminence; neural layer of retina; muscle of thigh; More reference expression data
BioGPS	More reference expression data
Gene ontology
Molecular function	DNA binding; protein homodimerization activity; transcription corepressor activity; calcium-dependent protein binding; ubiquitin binding; protein binding; nuclear receptor coactivator activity; virion binding; ubiquitin protein ligase binding; protein-containing complex binding
Cellular component	cytoplasm; multivesicular body; endosome; late endosome; membrane; late endosome membrane; plasma membrane; early endosome; nucleolus; endosome membrane; extracellular exosome; ESCRT I complex; nucleus; cytosol; host cell; microtubule organizing center; cytoskeleton; early endosome membrane; Flemming body
Biological process	intracellular transport of virus; cell differentiation; positive regulation of ubiquitin-dependent endocytosis; regulation of extracellular exosome assembly; viral budding via host ESCRT complex; viral life cycle; endosome to lysosome transport; multivesicular body assembly; protein monoubiquitination; viral budding; keratinocyte differentiation; cell division; endosomal transport; autophagosome maturation; regulation of cell growth; protein transport; ubiquitin-dependent protein catabolic process via the multivesicular body sorting pathway; regulation of MAP kinase activity; positive regulation of exosomal secretion; cell cycle; regulation of growth; negative regulation of transcription, DNA-templated; negative regulation of cell population proliferation; viral process; exosomal secretion; macroautophagy; negative regulation of epidermal growth factor receptor signaling pathway; negative regulation of epidermal growth factor-activated receptor activity; transport; extracellular transport; positive regulation of nucleic acid-templated transcription
Sources:Amigo / QuickGO
Orthologs
Databases	NCBI: entry; OMA: entry
Species	Human	Mouse
Entrez	7251	22088
Ensembl	ENSG00000074319	ENSMUSG00000014402
UniProt	Q99816	Q61187
RefSeq (mRNA)	NM_006292	NM_021884; NM_001348088; NM_001348089
RefSeq (protein)	NP_006283	NP_068684; NP_001335017; NP_001335018
Location (UCSC)	Chr 11: 18.47 – 18.53 Mb	Chr 7: 46.54 – 46.57 Mb
PubMed search
- Wikidata
View/Edit Human	View/Edit Mouse

Tumor susceptibility gene 101, also known as TSG101, is a human gene that encodes for a cellular protein of the same name.

== Function ==
The protein encoded by this gene belongs to a group of apparently inactive homologs of ubiquitin-conjugating enzymes. The gene product contains a coiled-coil domain that interacts with stathmin, a cytosolic phosphoprotein implicated in tumorigenesis. The protein may play a role in cell growth and differentiation and act as a negative growth regulator. In vitro steady-state expression of this tumor susceptibility gene appears to be important for maintenance of genomic stability and cell cycle regulation. Mutations and alternative splicing in this gene occur in high frequency in breast cancer and suggest that defects occur during breast cancer tumorigenesis and/or progression.

The main role of TSG101 is to participate in the ESCRT (endosomal sorting complexes required for transport) pathway. This pathway facilitates reverse topology budding and formation of multivesicular bodies (MVB) which deliver cargo destined for degradation to the lysosomes. TSG101 recognises a short linear motif, P(T/S)AP, via the UEV protein domain of the VPS23/TSG101 subunit. The assembly of the ESCRT-I complex is directed by the C-terminal steadiness box (SB) of VPS23, the N-terminal half of VPS28, and the C-terminal half of VPS37. The structure is primarily composed of three long, parallel helical hairpins, each corresponding to a different subunit. The additional domains and motifs extending beyond the core serve as gripping tools for ESCRT-I critical functions.

== Viral hijacking ==
TSG101 plays an important role in the pathogenesis of HIV and other viruses. In uninfected cells, TSG101 functions in the biogenesis of the multivesicular body (MVB), which suggests that HIV may bind TSG101 in order to gain access to the downstream machinery that catalyzes MVB vesicle budding.

== Interactions ==
TSG101 has been shown to interact with:

- EP300,
- HGS,
- LRSAM1,
- P21,
- P53, and
- VPS28.

== Orthologue, Vps23 ==
Vps23_core
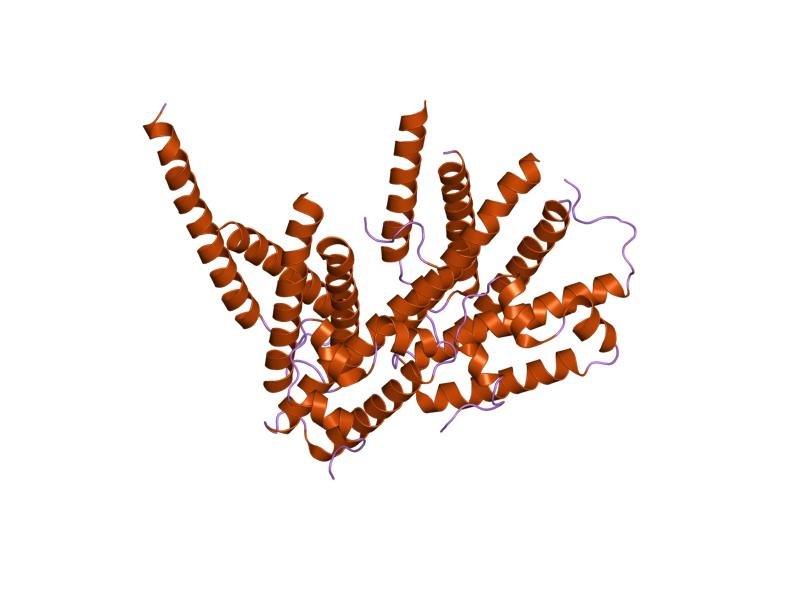
- escrt-i core

Identifiers
- Symbol: Vps23_core
- Pfam: PF09454
- InterPro: IPR017916
Available protein structures:
- PDB: IPR017916 PF09454 (ECOD; PDBsum)
- AlphaFold: IPR017916; PF09454

In humans, the orthologue of vps23 which has a component of ESCRT-1 is called Tsg101. Mutations in Tsg-101 have been linked to cervical, breast, prostate and gastrointestinal cancers. In molecular biology, vps23 (vacuolar protein sorting) is a protein domain. Vps proteins are components of the ESCRTs (endosomal sorting complexes required for transport) which are required for protein sorting at the early endosome. More specifically, vps23 is a component of ESCRT-I. The ESCRT complexes form the machinery driving protein sorting from endosomes to lysosomes. ESCRT complexes are central to receptor down-regulation, lysosome biogenesis and budding of HIV.

== Structure ==
Yeast ESCRT-I consists of three protein subunits, VPS23, VPS28, and VPS37. In humans, ESCRT-I comprises TSG101, VPS28, and one of four potential human VPS37 homologues.

== See also ==
- FGI-104 - an ESCRT inhibitor being researched as a broad spectrum antiviral
