= VPS28 =

Protein-coding gene in the species Homo sapiens

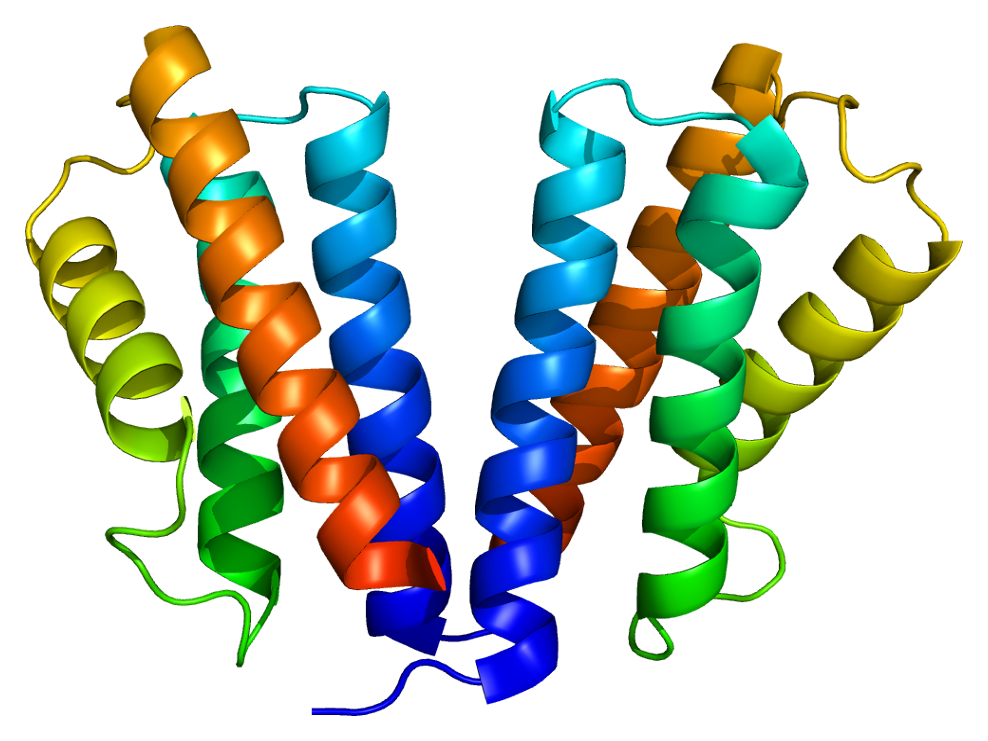

Identifiers
- Aliases: VPS28, ESCRT-I subunit, VPS28 subunit of ESCRT-I
- External IDs: OMIM: 611952; MGI: 1914164; GeneCards: VPS28

Gene location (Human)
Chr.	Chromosome 8 (human)
Band	8q24.3	Start	144,423,601 bp
Band	8q24.3	End	144,428,563 bp

Gene location (Mouse)
Chr.	Chromosome 15 (mouse)
Band	15|15 D3	Start	76,506,287 bp
Band	15|15 D3	End	76,510,286 bp
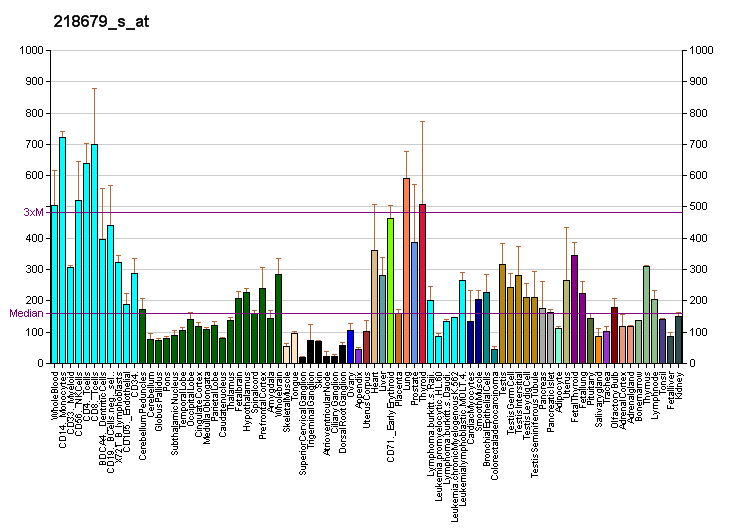
RNA expression pattern
Bgee	Human / Mouse (ortholog); Top expressed in: right uterine tube; left testis; apex of heart; right lobe of thyroid gland; right ovary; left ovary; duodenum; fundus; right testis; left lobe of thyroid gland / Top expressed in: ankle joint; facial motor nucleus; right lung lobe; central gray substance of midbrain; vestibular membrane of cochlear duct; anterior horn of spinal cord; transitional epithelium of urinary bladder; nucleus of stria terminalis; granulocyte; adrenal gland; More reference expression data
BioGPS	More reference expression data
Gene ontology
Molecular function	protein-containing complex binding; ubiquitin binding; protein binding
Cellular component	cytoplasm; cytosol; endosome; membrane; late endosome membrane; plasma membrane; early endosome; endosome membrane; extracellular exosome; ESCRT I complex; host cell
Biological process	intracellular transport of virus; positive regulation of ubiquitin-dependent endocytosis; positive regulation of protein catabolic process; viral budding via host ESCRT complex; viral life cycle; multivesicular body assembly; endosomal transport; negative regulation of protein ubiquitination; protein transport; ubiquitin-dependent protein catabolic process via the multivesicular body sorting pathway; protein transport to vacuole involved in ubiquitin-dependent protein catabolic process via the multivesicular body sorting pathway; macroautophagy; transport; endosome transport via multivesicular body sorting pathway
Sources:Amigo / QuickGO
Orthologs
Databases	NCBI: entry; OMA: entry
Species	Human	Mouse
Entrez	51160	66914
Ensembl	ENSG00000160948; ENSG00000285339	ENSMUSG00000115987
UniProt	Q9UK41; Q548N1	Q9D1C8
RefSeq (mRNA)	NM_016208; NM_183057	NM_025842; NM_001305668
RefSeq (protein)	NP_057292; NP_898880; NP_057292.1	NP_001292597; NP_080118
Location (UCSC)	Chr 8: 144.42 – 144.43 Mb	Chr 15: 76.51 – 76.51 Mb
PubMed search
- Wikidata
View/Edit Human	View/Edit Mouse

Vacuolar protein sorting-associated protein 28 homolog is a protein that in humans is encoded by the VPS28 gene.

== Function ==
This gene encodes a protein involved in endosomal sorting of cell surface receptors via a multivesicular body/late endosome pathway. The encoded protein is one of the three subunits of the ESCRT-I complex (endosomal complexes required for transport) involved in the sorting of ubiquitinated protein. The two other subunits of ESCRT-I are vacuolar protein sorting 23 (VPS23), also known as tumor susceptibility gene 101 (TSG101), and vacuolar protein sorting 37 (VPS37). Two alternative transcripts encoding different isoforms have been described. Additional alternative transcripts may exist but the proteins encoded by these transcripts have not been verified experimentally.

== Interactions ==
VPS28 has been shown to interact with TSG101.
