= SNF8 =

Protein-coding gene in the species Homo sapiens

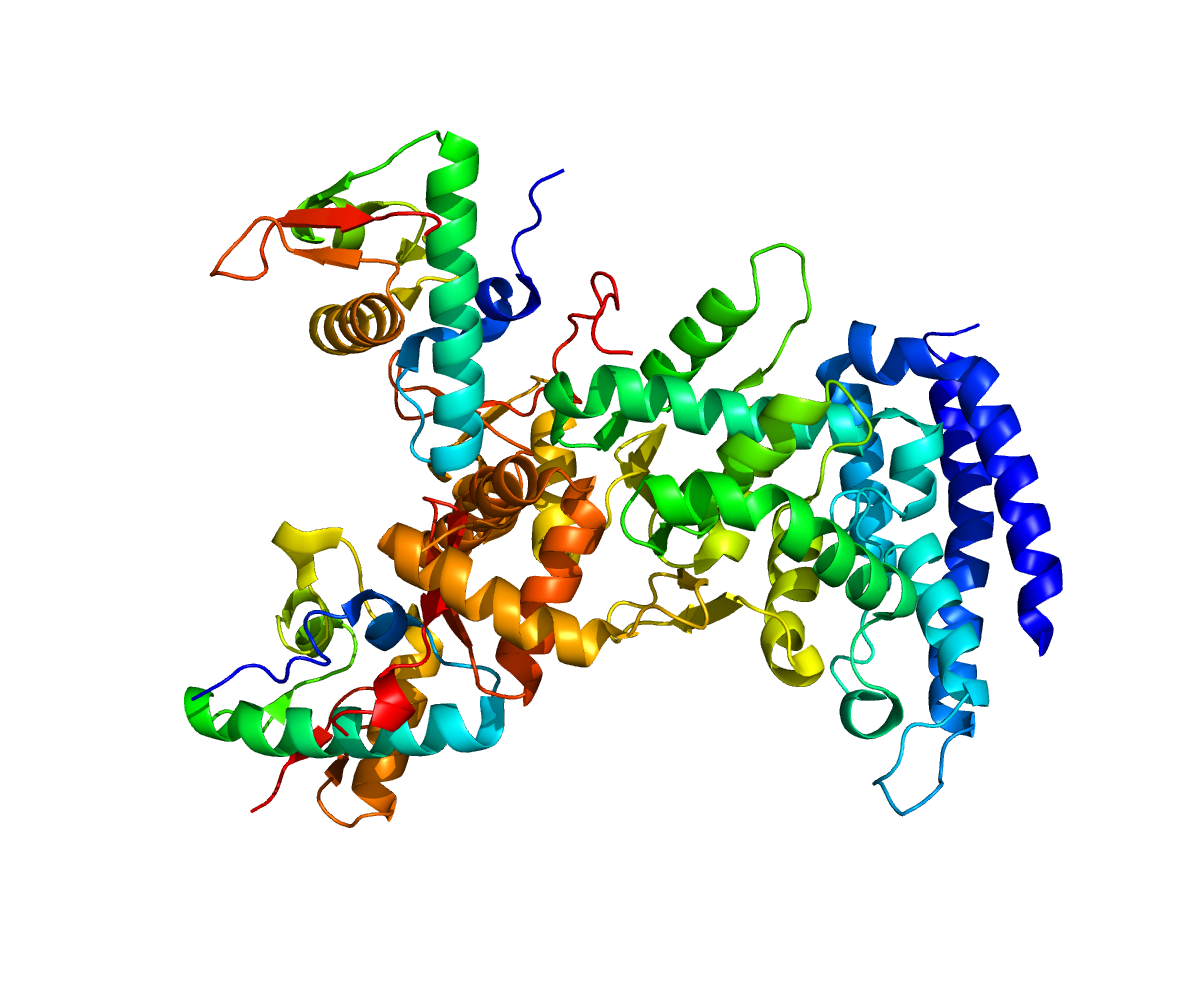

Identifiers
- Aliases: SNF8, Dot3, EAP30, VPS22, ESCRT-II complex subunit, SNF8 subunit of ESCRT-II
- External IDs: OMIM: 610904; MGI: 1343161; GeneCards: SNF8
Available structures
| PDB | Ortholog search: PDBe RCSB |
| PDB | List of PDB id codes 2ZME, 3CUQ |

Gene location (Human)
| Chr. | Chromosome 17 (human) |
| Band | 17q21.32 | Start | 48,929,316 bp |
| Band | 17q21.32 | End | 48,944,842 bp |

Gene location (Mouse)
| Chr. | Chromosome 11 (mouse) |
| Band | 11 D|11 59.24 cM | Start | 95,925,711 bp |
| Band | 11 D|11 59.24 cM | End | 95,938,256 bp |
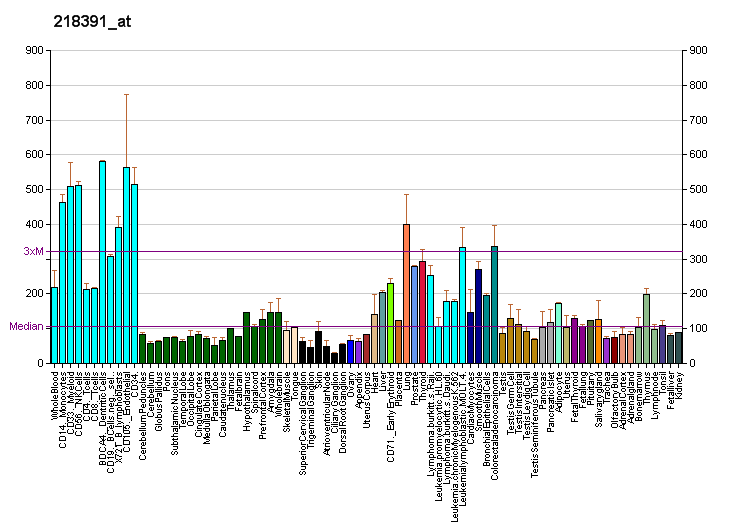
RNA expression pattern
| Bgee | Human / Mouse (ortholog); Top expressed in: apex of heart; mucosa of transverse colon; gastric mucosa; stromal cell of endometrium; left coronary artery; ganglionic eminence; right auricle of heart; right adrenal gland; popliteal artery; tibial arteries / Top expressed in: embryo; yolk sac; morula; dentate gyrus of hippocampal formation granule cell; epiblast; blastocyst; right kidney; superior frontal gyrus; facial motor nucleus; duodenum; More reference expression data |
| BioGPS | More reference expression data |
Gene ontology
| Molecular function | protein homodimerization activity; protein N-terminus binding; transcription factor binding; protein C-terminus binding; channel regulator activity; protein binding |
| Cellular component | cytoplasm; recycling endosome; cytosol; endosome; membrane; late endosome membrane; transcription regulator complex; plasma membrane; nucleoplasm; perinuclear region of cytoplasm; endosome membrane; extracellular exosome; nucleus; ESCRT II complex |
| Biological process | regulation of transcription, DNA-templated; positive regulation of protein catabolic process; multivesicular body sorting pathway; regulation of transcription by RNA polymerase II; multivesicular body assembly; regulation of multivesicular body size involved in endosome transport; transcription, DNA-templated; endosomal transport; regulation of protein complex stability; positive regulation of gene expression; early endosome to late endosome transport; endocytic recycling; regulation of protein catabolic process; protein transport; regulation of MAP kinase activity; positive regulation of exosomal secretion; protein transport to vacuole involved in ubiquitin-dependent protein catabolic process via the multivesicular body sorting pathway; macroautophagy; regulation of molecular function; transport |
Sources:Amigo / QuickGO
Orthologs
| Databases | NCBI: entry; OMA: entry |
| Species | Human | Mouse |
| Entrez | 11267 | 27681 |
| Ensembl | ENSG00000159210 | ENSMUSG00000006058 |
| UniProt | Q96H20 | Q9CZ28 |
| RefSeq (mRNA) | NM_007241; NM_001317192; NM_001317193; NM_001317194 | NM_033568; NM_001356362 |
| RefSeq (protein) | NP_001304121; NP_001304122; NP_001304123; NP_009172 | NP_291046; NP_001343291 |
| Location (UCSC) | Chr 17: 48.93 – 48.94 Mb | Chr 11: 95.93 – 95.94 Mb |
| PubMed search |
- Wikidata
| View/Edit Human | View/Edit Mouse |

Vacuolar-sorting protein SNF8 is a protein that in humans is encoded by the SNF8 gene. It is a part of ESCRT-II complex.
