= VTA1 =

Protein-coding gene in the species Homo sapiens

Identifiers
- Aliases: VTA1, C6orf55, DRG-1, DRG1, LIP5, My012, SBP1, HSPC228, vesicle trafficking 1, 6orf55
- External IDs: OMIM: 610902; MGI: 1913451; GeneCards: VTA1
Available structures
PDB	Ortholog search: PDBe RCSB
PDB	List of PDB id codes 2LXL, 2LXM, 4TXP, 4TXQ, 4TXR, 4U7E

Gene location (Human)
Chr.	Chromosome 6 (human)
Band	6q24.1-q24.2	Start	142,147,162 bp
Band	6q24.1-q24.2	End	142,224,685 bp

Gene location (Mouse)
Chr.	Chromosome 10 (mouse)
Band	10|10 A2	Start	14,530,499 bp
Band	10|10 A2	End	14,581,304 bp
RNA expression pattern
Bgee	Human / Mouse (ortholog); Top expressed in: ganglionic eminence; pancreatic epithelial cell; amniotic fluid; deltoid muscle; ventricular zone; tibialis anterior muscle; islet of Langerhans; vastus lateralis muscle; skin of arm; mucosa of ileum / Top expressed in: zygote; medial ganglionic eminence; secondary oocyte; genital tubercle; neural layer of retina; tail of embryo; granulocyte; primary oocyte; dentate gyrus of hippocampal formation granule cell; right kidney; More reference expression data
BioGPS	n/a
Gene ontology
Molecular function	protein C-terminus binding; protein binding
Cellular component	cytoplasm; cytosol; endosome; endosome membrane; extracellular exosome; membrane; nucleoplasm; intracellular membrane-bounded organelle
Biological process	protein transport; endosomal transport; multivesicular body assembly; viral life cycle; multivesicular body sorting pathway; ESCRT III complex disassembly; macroautophagy; transport
Sources:Amigo / QuickGO
Orthologs
Databases	NCBI: entry; OMA: entry
Species	Human	Mouse
Entrez	51534	66201
Ensembl	ENSG00000009844	ENSMUSG00000019868
UniProt	Q9NP79	Q9CR26
RefSeq (mRNA)	NM_016485; NM_001286371; NM_001286372	NM_025418
RefSeq (protein)	NP_001273300; NP_001273301; NP_057569	NP_079694
Location (UCSC)	Chr 6: 142.15 – 142.22 Mb	Chr 10: 14.53 – 14.58 Mb
PubMed search
- Wikidata
View/Edit Human	View/Edit Mouse

Vacuolar protein sorting-associated protein VTA1 homolog is a protein that in humans is encoded by the VTA1 gene.
