= VPS36 =

Protein-coding gene in the species Homo sapiens

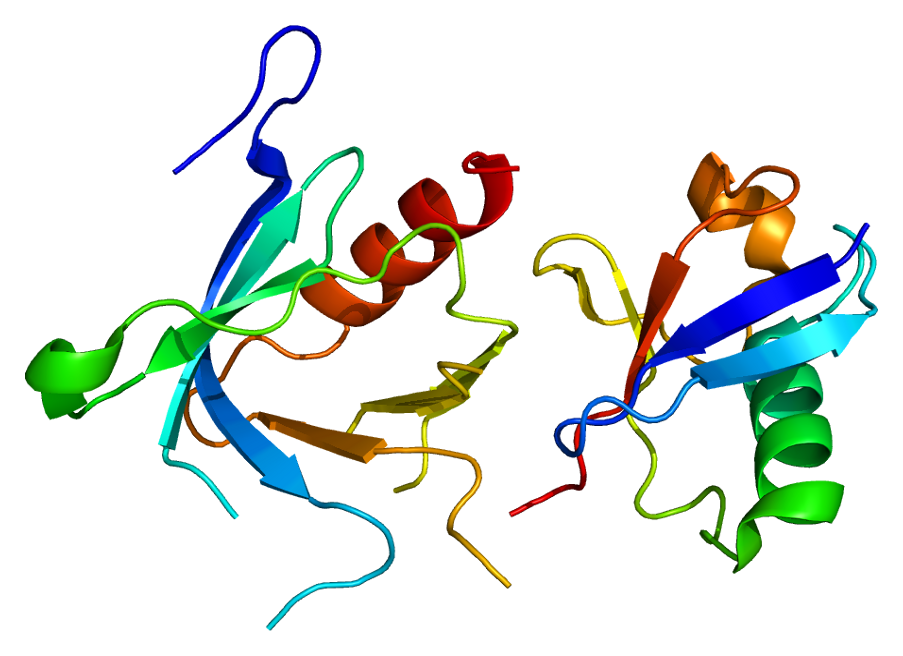

Identifiers
- Aliases: VPS36, C13orf9, EAP45, CGI-145, vacuolar protein sorting 36 homolog
- External IDs: OMIM: 610903; MGI: 1917410; GeneCards: VPS36
Available structures
PDB	Ortholog search: PDBe RCSB
PDB	List of PDB id codes 2HTH, 2ZME, 3CUQ

Gene location (Human)
Chr.	Chromosome 13 (human)
Band	13q14.3	Start	52,412,602 bp
Band	13q14.3	End	52,450,634 bp

Gene location (Mouse)
Chr.	Chromosome 8 (mouse)
Band	8|8 A2	Start	22,682,825 bp
Band	8|8 A2	End	22,710,859 bp
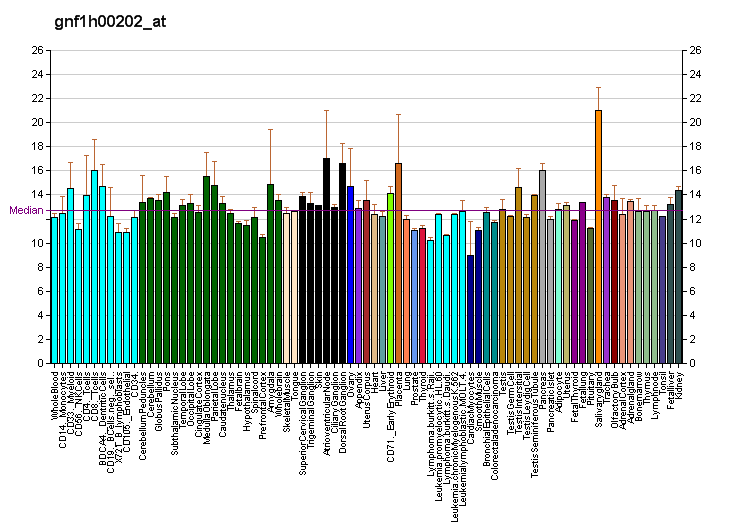
RNA expression pattern
Bgee	Human / Mouse (ortholog); Top expressed in: skin of arm; mucosa of ileum; skin of hip; skin of thigh; pancreatic epithelial cell; pancreatic ductal cell; tibialis anterior muscle; endothelial cell; skin of abdomen; gingival epithelium / Top expressed in: trigeminal ganglion; urothelium; transitional epithelium of urinary bladder; Paneth cell; hair follicle; ureter; medullary collecting duct; otic vesicle; endocardial cushion; spermatid; More reference expression data
BioGPS	More reference expression data
Gene ontology
Molecular function	phosphatidylinositol-3-phosphate binding; protein C-terminus binding; ubiquitin binding; protein binding; lipid binding
Cellular component	cytoplasm; cytosol; late endosome; membrane; late endosome membrane; lysosome; extracellular exosome; nucleus; endosome; ESCRT II complex
Biological process	regulation of transcription, DNA-templated; multivesicular body assembly; transcription, DNA-templated; endosomal transport; protein transport; protein transport to vacuole involved in ubiquitin-dependent protein catabolic process via the multivesicular body sorting pathway; macroautophagy; transport; endosome transport via multivesicular body sorting pathway
Sources:Amigo / QuickGO
Orthologs
Databases	NCBI: entry; OMA: entry
Species	Human	Mouse
Entrez	51028	70160
Ensembl	ENSG00000136100	ENSMUSG00000031479
UniProt	Q86VN1	Q91XD6
RefSeq (mRNA)	NM_016075; NM_001282168; NM_001282169	NM_027338; NM_001368379
RefSeq (protein)	NP_001269097; NP_001269098; NP_057159	NP_081614; NP_001355308
Location (UCSC)	Chr 13: 52.41 – 52.45 Mb	Chr 8: 22.68 – 22.71 Mb
PubMed search
- Wikidata
View/Edit Human	View/Edit Mouse

Vacuolar protein-sorting-associated protein 36 is a protein that in humans is encoded by the VPS36 gene.
