= Chromosome 9 =

Human chromosome

- Human chromosome 9 pair after G-banding: One is from the mother, one is from the father.

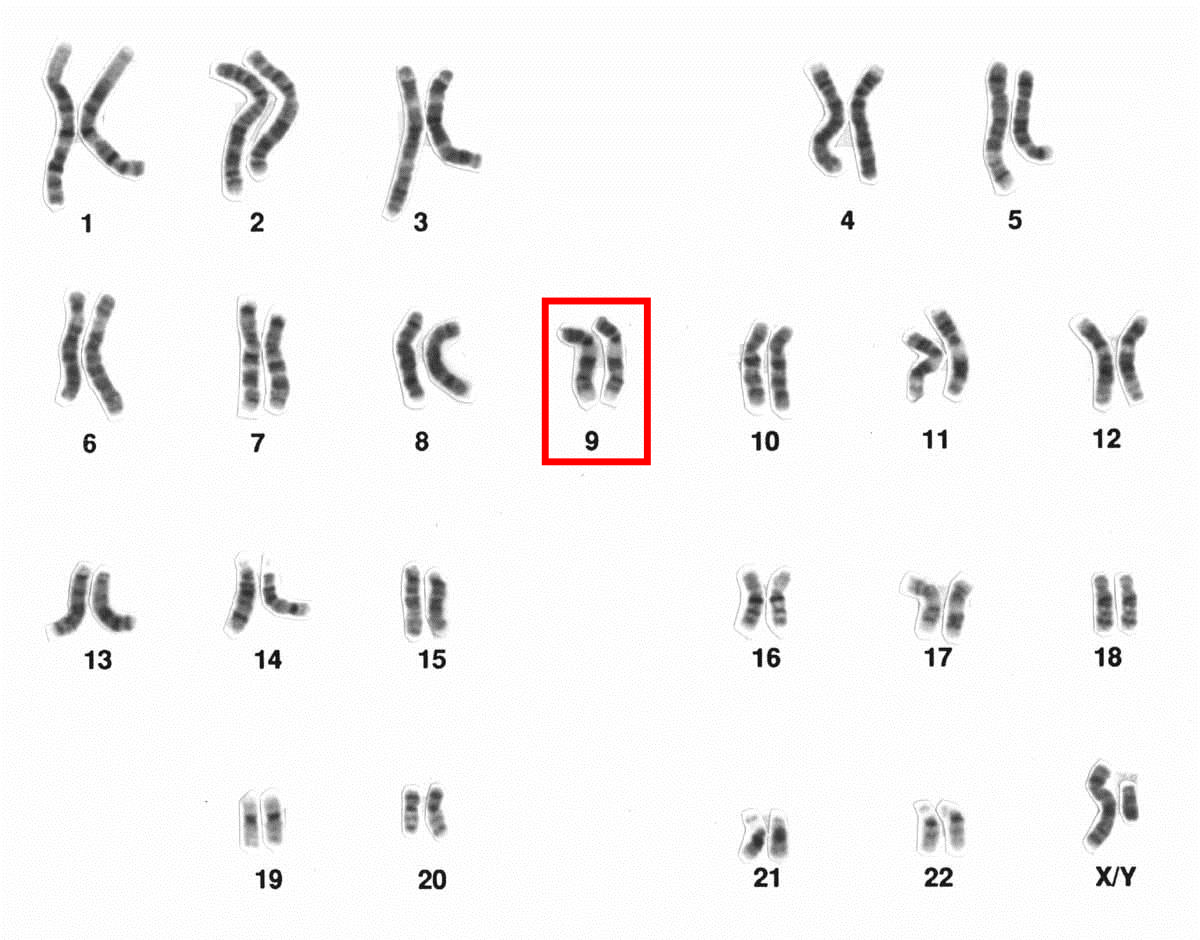
- Chromosome 9 pair in human male karyogram

Features
- Length (bp): 150,617,247 bp (CHM13)
- No. of genes: 739 (CCDS)
- Type: Autosome
- Centromere position: Submetacentric (43.0 Mbp)

Complete gene lists
- CCDS: Gene list
- HGNC: Gene list
- UniProt: Gene list
- NCBI: Gene list

External map viewers
- Ensembl: Chromosome 9
- Entrez: Chromosome 9
- NCBI: Chromosome 9
- UCSC: Chromosome 9

Full DNA sequences
- RefSeq: NC_000009 (FASTA)
- GenBank: CM000671 (FASTA)

Chromosome 9 is one of the 23 pairs of chromosomes in humans. Humans normally have two copies of this chromosome, as they normally do with all chromosomes. Chromosome 9 spans about 138 million base pairs of nucleic acids (the building blocks of DNA) and represents between 4.0 and 4.5% of the total DNA in cells.

== Genes ==
=== Number of genes ===
These are some of the gene count estimates of human chromosome 9. Because researchers use different approaches to genome annotation, their predictions of the number of genes on each chromosome varies (for technical details, see gene prediction). Among various projects, the collaborative consensus coding sequence project (CCDS) takes an extremely conservative strategy. So CCDS's gene number prediction represents a lower bound on the total number of human protein-coding genes.

Estimated by	Protein-coding genes	Noncoding RNA genes	Pseudogenes	Source	Release date
CCDS	739	—	—		2016-09-08
HGNC	749	246	590		2017-05-12
Ensembl	775	788	663		2017-03-29
UniProt	812	—	—		2018-02-28
NCBI	822	830	738		2017-05-19

=== Gene list ===
The following is a partial list of genes on human chromosome 9. For a complete list, see the link in the infobox on the right.

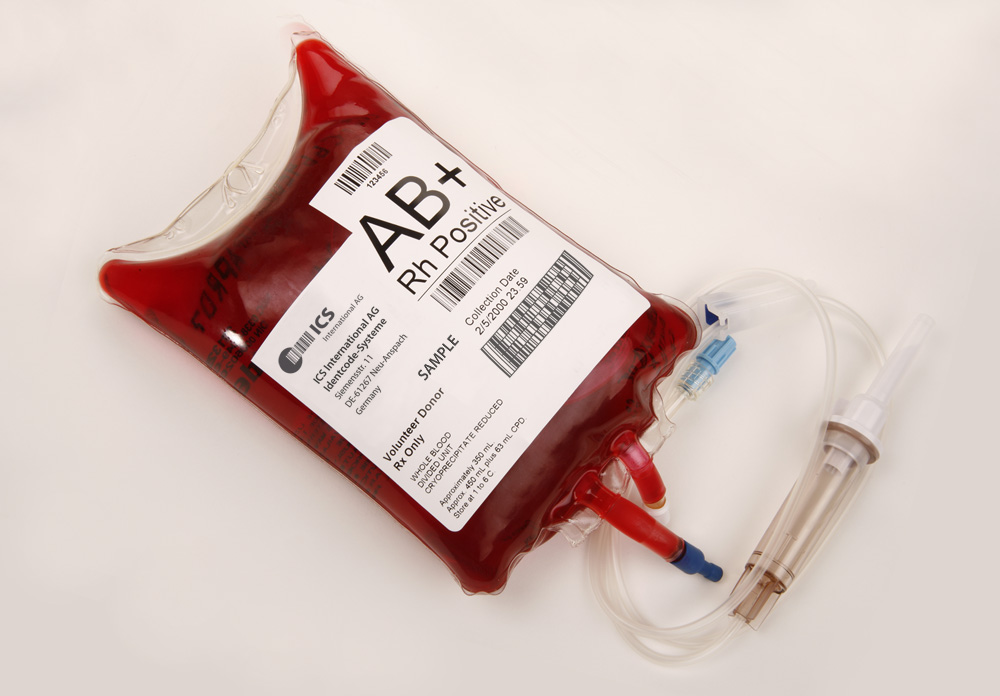
The ABO gene, which determines ABO blood type, is located on the long arm of this chromosome. (Location: 9q34.2)

- ABO: ABO histo-blood group glycosyltransferases
- ACTL7A: encoding protein Actin-like protein 7A
- ADAMTS13: ADAM metallopeptidase with thrombospondin type 1 motif, 13
- AIF1L: allograft inflammatory factor 1-like
- ALAD: aminolevulinate, delta-, dehydratase
- ALS4: amyotrophic lateral sclerosis 4
- ANGPTL2: angiopoietin-related protein 2
- ASS: argininosuccinate synthetase
- BANCR: encoding protein BRAF-activated non-protein coding RNA
- BNC2: zinc finger protein basonuclin-2
- C9orf64: chromosome 9 open reading frame 64
- C9orf78: encoding protein Uncharacterized protein C9orf78
- SHOC1: Shortage In Chiasmata 1
- C9orf25: encoding protein Chromosome 9 open reading frame 25
- C9orf43: encoding protein Chromosome 9 open reading frame 43
- C9orf135: encoding protein Chromosome 9 open reading frame 135
- C9orf152: chromosome 9 open reading frame 152
- C9orf156: encoding protein Chromosome 9 open reading frame 156
- CAAP1: caspase activity and apoptosis inhibitor 1
- CARD19: caspase recruitment domain family member 19
- CBWD1: COBW domain-containing protein 1
- CCDC180: Coiled coil domain-containing protein 180
- CCL21: chemokine (C-C motif) ligand 21, SCYA21
- CCL27: chemokine (C-C motif) ligand 27, SCYA27
- CFAP157: Cilia and flagella associated protein 157
- CHMP5: Charged multivesicular body protein 5
- CNTLN: centlein
- CDKN2BAS: CDKN2B antisense RNA 1 or antisense non-coding RNA in the INK4 locus (ANRIL)
- COL5A1: collagen, type V, alpha 1
- DDX31: DEAD box polypeptide 31
- DENND1A: DENN domain-containing protein 1A
- ENG: endoglin (Osler-Rendu-Weber syndrome 1)
- ENTPD2: encoding enzyme ectonucleoside triphosphate diphosphohydrolase 2
- EQTN: equatorin
- FAM73B: family with sequence similarity 73 member B
- FAM120A: Family with sequence similarity 120 member A
- FAM122a: encoding protein Family with sequence similarity 122A
- FBP1: Fructose-1,6-bisphosphatase 1
- FIBCD1: encoding protein Fibrinogen C domain containing 1
- FOCAD: focadhesin
- FXN: frataxin
- GALT: galactose-1-phosphate uridylyltransferase
- GAS1: growth arrest-specific protein 1
- GCNT1: glucosaminyl (N-acetyl) transferase 1
- GLE1L: Nucleoporin GLE1
- GPR107: G protein-coupled receptor 107
- GRHPR: glyoxylate redasductase/hydroxypyruvate reductase
- GSN: cytoplasmic and plasma gelsolin
- HAUS6: HAUS augmin-like complex subunit 6
- HEMGN: encoding protein hemogen
- IFN1@: Interferon, type 1, cluster
- IKBKAP: inhibitor of kappa light polypeptide gene enhancer in B-cells, kinase complex-associated protein
- INSL6: insulin like 6
- ISCA1: iron-sulfur cluster assembly 1 homolog, mitochondrial
- KIAA1958: protein KIAA1958
- KYAT1: Kynurenine aminotransferase 1
- LINGO2: leucine rich repeat and Ig domain containing 2
- LOC101928193: encoding protein LOC101928193
- MGC50722: Protein MGC50722, Uncharacterized Protein LOC399693
- MIR181A2HG: encoding protein MIR181A2 host gene
- MIR7-1: microRNA 7-1
- MSMP: encoding protein Microseminoprotein, prostate associated
- MTAP: S-methyl-5'-thioadenosine phosphorylase
- NAA35: encoding protein N(alpha)-acetyltransferase 35, NatC auxiliary subunit
- NANS: N-acetylneuraminate synthase
- NINJ1: ninjurin-1
- NOL6: nucleolar protein 6
- NUDT2: nudix hydrolase 2
- OBP2B: encoding protein Odorant-binding protein 2B
- OLFM1: olfactomedin 1
- PHF2: PHD finger protein 2
- PHPT1: phosphohistidine phosphatase 1
- PIP5K1B: phosphatidylinositol-4-phosphate 5-kinase type-1 beta
- PLAA: phospholipase A-2-activating protein
- PMPCA: mitochondrial processing alpha subunit
- PRUNE2: protein prune homolog 2
- PTCH1: protein patched 1 transmembrane receptor protein
- RABGAP1: RAB GTPase activating protein 1
- REXO4: RNA exonuclease 4
- RNF183: encoding protein Ring finger protein 183
- SARDH: sarcosine dehydrogenase, mitochondrial
- SIT1: signaling threshold regulating transmembrane adapter 1
- SLC25A25-AS1: encoding protein SLC25A25 antisense RNA 1
- SNORD24: encoding protein small nucleolar RNA, C/D box 24
- SPAG8: sperm-associated antigen 8
- SPIN1: spindlin-1
- ST6GALNAC4: encoding enzyme ST6 (alpha-N-acetyl-neuraminyl-2,3-beta-galactosyl-1,3)-N-acetylgalactosaminide alpha-2,6-sialyltransferase 4, also known as sialyltransferase 3C (SIAT3-C) or sialyltransferase 7D (SIAT7-D)
- ST6GALNAC6: ST6 N-acetylgalactosaminide alpha-2,6-sialyltransferase 6
- STOML2: stomatin-like protein 2
- STRBP: spermatid perinuclear RNA-binding protein
- TEX10: testis expressed 10
- TGFBR1: transforming growth factor beta, receptor type I
- TMC1: transmembrane channel-like 1
- TMEM215: encoding protein Transmembrane protein 215
- TMEM268: Transmembrane protein 268
- TOR2A: encoding protein Torsin-2A
- TSC1: tuberous sclerosis complex 1
- TTC39B: tetratricopeptide repeat protein 39B
- UBAC1: ubiquitin-associated domain containing protein 1
- UBAP1: ubiquitin-associated protein 1
- UBAP2: ubiquitin-associated protein 2
- ZBTB43: zinc finger and BTB domain containing 43
- ZCCHC6: zinc finger, CCHC domain containing 6
- ZDHHC21: zinc finger DHHC-type containing 21
- ZNF79: zinc finger protein 79
- ZNF367: encoding protein Zinc finger protein 367
- ZNF510: zinc finger protein 510

== Diseases and disorders ==
The following diseases are some of those related to genes on chromosome 9:

- acytosiosis
- ALA-D deficiency porphyria
- Amyotrophic lateral sclerosis
- citrullinemia
- Coronary artery disease
- chronic myelogenous leukemia (t9;22 - the Philadelphia chromosome)
- Diaphyseal Medullary Stenosis with Malignant Fibrous Histiosytoma (DMS-MFH, Hardcastle syndrome)
- Ehlers-Danlos syndrome
- familial dysautonomia
- Friedreich ataxia
- Frontotemporal dementia
- galactosemia
- Gorlin syndrome or nevoid basal cell carcinoma syndrome
- hereditary hemorrhagic telangiectasia
- lethal congenital contracture syndrome
- nail-patella syndrome (NPS)
- nonsyndromic deafness
- OCD
- polycythemia vera
- porphyria
- primary hyperoxaluria
- STXBP1
- Tangier disease
- tetrasomy 9p
- thrombotic thrombocytopenic purpura
- trisomy 9
- tuberous sclerosis
- VLDLR-associated cerebellar hypoplasia

== Cytogenetic band ==
G-banding ideograms of human chromosome 9

G-banding ideogram of human chromosome 9 in resolution 850 bphs. Band length in this diagram is proportional to base-pair length. This type of ideogram is generally used in genome browsers (e.g. Ensembl, UCSC Genome Browser).

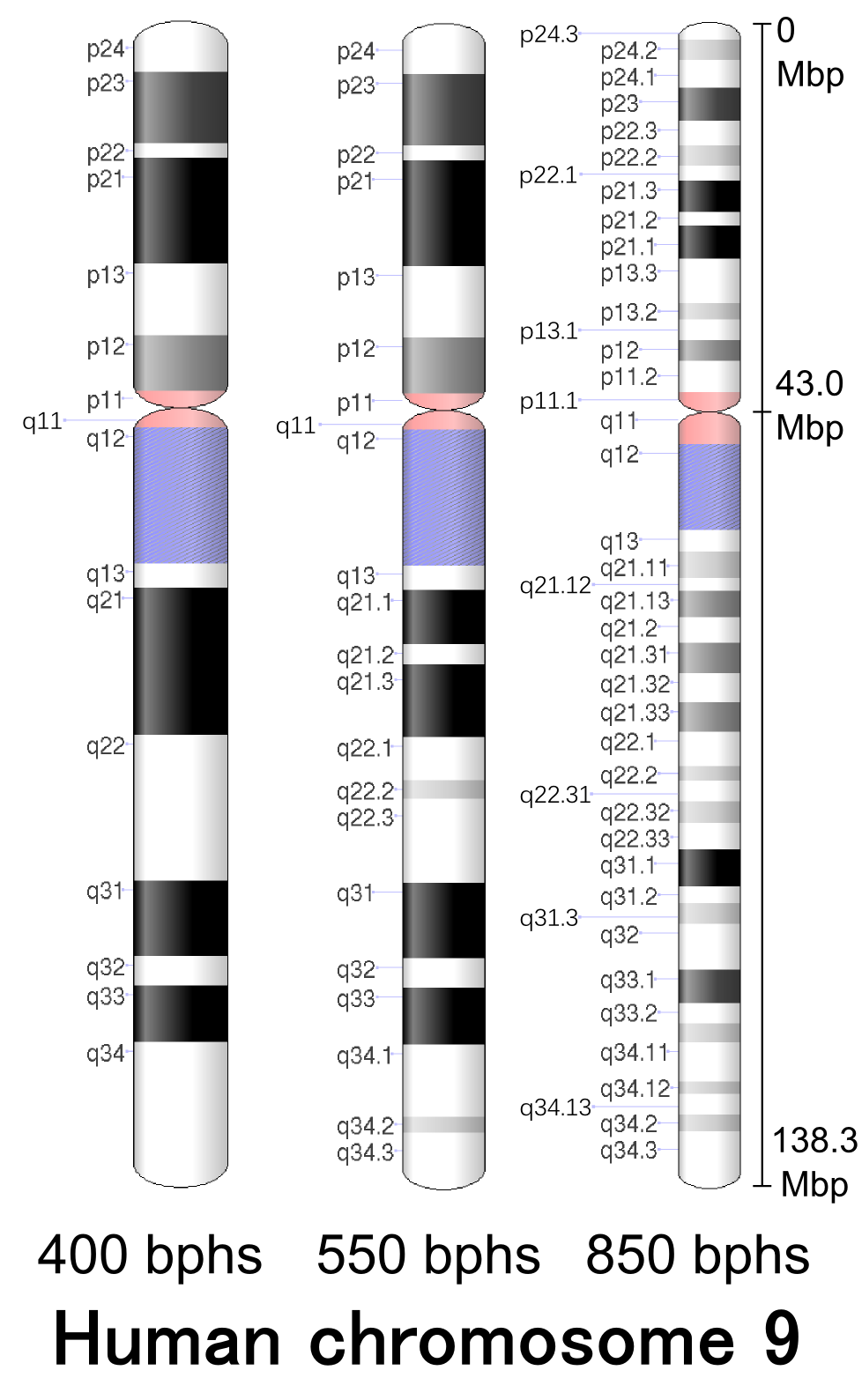
G-banding patterns of human chromosome 9 in three different resolutions (400, 550 and 850). Band length in this diagram is based on the ideograms from ISCN (2013). This type of ideogram represents actual relative band length observed under a microscope at the different moments during the mitotic process.

G-bands of human chromosome 9 in resolution 850 bphs
Chr.	Arm	Band	ISCN start	ISCN stop	Basepair start	Basepair stop	Stain	Density
9	p	24.3	0	127	1	2,200,000	gneg	
9	p	24.2	127	268	2,200,001	4,600,000	gpos	25
9	p	24.1	268	451	4,600,001	9,000,000	gneg	
9	p	23	451	677	9,000,001	14,200,000	gpos	75
9	p	22.3	677	846	14,200,001	16,600,000	gneg	
9	p	22.2	846	987	16,600,001	18,500,000	gpos	25
9	p	22.1	987	1085	18,500,001	19,900,000	gneg	
9	p	21.3	1085	1297	19,900,001	25,600,000	gpos	100
9	p	21.2	1297	1395	25,600,001	28,000,000	gneg	
9	p	21.1	1395	1621	28,000,001	33,200,000	gpos	100
9	p	13.3	1621	1917	33,200,001	36,300,000	gneg	
9	p	13.2	1917	2030	36,300,001	37,900,000	gpos	25
9	p	13.1	2030	2171	37,900,001	39,000,000	gneg	
9	p	12	2171	2312	39,000,001	40,000,000	gpos	50
9	p	11.2	2312	2523	40,000,001	42,200,000	gneg	
9	p	11.1	2523	2650	42,200,001	43,000,000	acen	
9	q	11	2650	2876	43,000,001	45,500,000	acen	
9	q	12	2876	3468	45,500,001	61,500,000	gvar	
9	q	13	3468	3609	61,500,001	65,000,000	gneg	
9	q	21.11	3609	3792	65,000,001	69,300,000	gpos	25
9	q	21.12	3792	3876	69,300,001	71,300,000	gneg	
9	q	21.13	3876	4060	71,300,001	76,600,000	gpos	50
9	q	21.2	4060	4229	76,600,001	78,500,000	gneg	
9	q	21.31	4229	4440	78,500,001	81,500,000	gpos	50
9	q	21.32	4440	4638	81,500,001	84,300,000	gneg	
9	q	21.33	4638	4835	84,300,001	87,800,000	gpos	50
9	q	22.1	4835	5074	87,800,001	89,200,000	gneg	
9	q	22.2	5074	5173	89,200,001	91,200,000	gpos	25
9	q	22.31	5173	5314	91,200,001	93,900,000	gneg	
9	q	22.32	5314	5455	93,900,001	96,500,000	gpos	25
9	q	22.33	5455	5638	96,500,001	99,800,000	gneg	
9	q	31.1	5638	5892	99,800,001	105,400,000	gpos	100
9	q	31.2	5892	6005	105,400,001	108,500,000	gneg	
9	q	31.3	6005	6146	108,500,001	112,100,000	gpos	25
9	q	32	6146	6456	112,100,001	114,900,000	gneg	
9	q	33.1	6456	6681	114,900,001	119,800,000	gpos	75
9	q	33.2	6681	6822	119,800,001	123,100,000	gneg	
9	q	33.3	6822	6949	123,100,001	127,500,000	gpos	25
9	q	34.11	6949	7217	127,500,001	130,600,000	gneg	
9	q	34.12	7217	7302	130,600,001	131,100,000	gpos	25
9	q	34.13	7302	7443	131,100,001	133,100,000	gneg	
9	q	34.2	7443	7555	133,100,001	134,500,000	gpos	25
9	q	34.3	7555	7950	134,500,001	138,394,717	gneg	
