= GPR107 =

Protein-coding gene in the species Homo sapiens

Identifiers
- Aliases: GPR107, GCDRP, LUSTR1, bA138E2.2, G protein-coupled receptor 107
- External IDs: OMIM: 618490; MGI: 2139054; GeneCards: GPR107

Gene location (Human)
Chr.	Chromosome 9 (human)
Band	9q34.11	Start	130,053,426 bp
Band	9q34.11	End	130,140,169 bp

Gene location (Mouse)
Chr.	Chromosome 2 (mouse)
Band	2|2 B	Start	31,042,328 bp
Band	2|2 B	End	31,108,787 bp
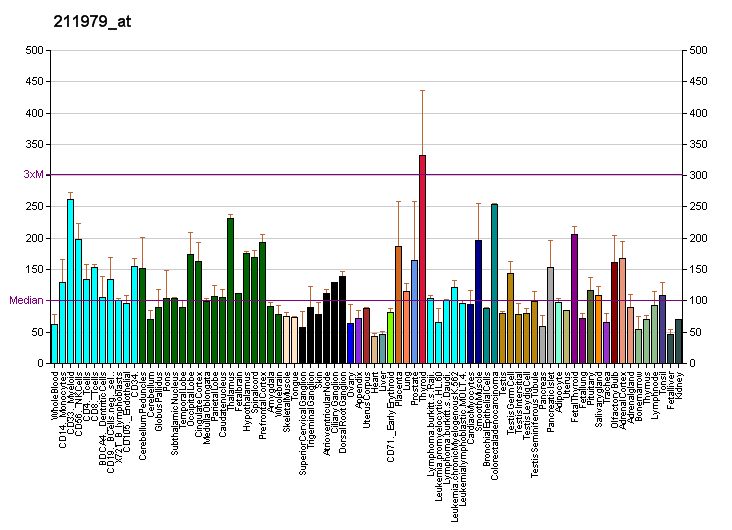

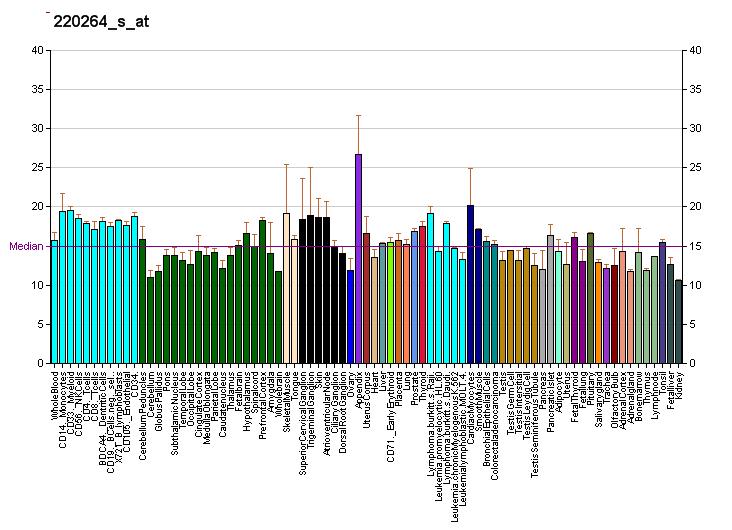

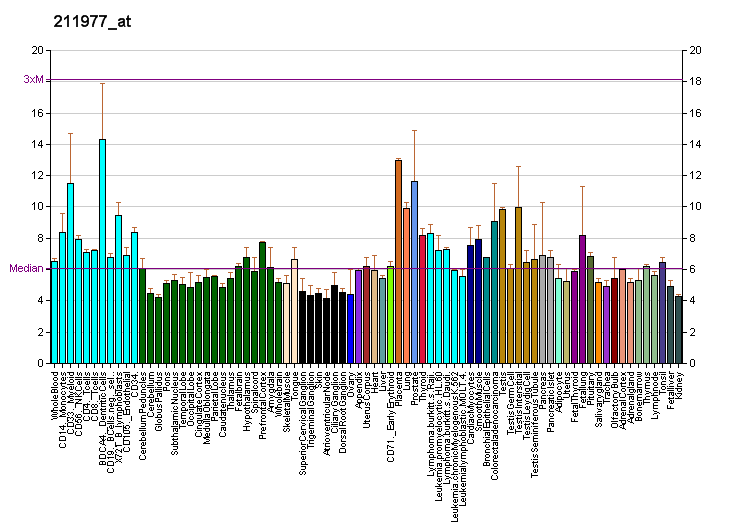
RNA expression pattern
Bgee	Human / Mouse (ortholog); Top expressed in: olfactory bulb; tendon of biceps brachii; beta cell; middle frontal gyrus; paraflocculus of cerebellum; internal globus pallidus; inferior olivary nucleus; dorsal motor nucleus of vagus nerve; corpus callosum; stromal cell of endometrium / Top expressed in: spermatocyte; otic vesicle; spermatid; otolith organ; utricle; granulocyte; gastrula; lip; jejunum; lumbar spinal ganglion; More reference expression data
BioGPS	More reference expression data
Gene ontology
Molecular function	clathrin heavy chain binding
Cellular component	integral component of membrane; early endosome; membrane; clathrin-coated vesicle; nucleoplasm; Golgi apparatus
Biological process	clathrin-dependent endocytosis
Sources:Amigo / QuickGO
Orthologs
Databases	NCBI: entry; OMA: entry
Species	Human	Mouse
Entrez	57720	277463
Ensembl	ENSG00000148358	ENSMUSG00000000194
UniProt	Q5VW38	Q8BUV8
RefSeq (mRNA)	NM_001136557; NM_001136558; NM_001287346; NM_020960	NM_178760
RefSeq (protein)	NP_001130029; NP_001130030; NP_001274275; NP_066011	NP_848875
Location (UCSC)	Chr 9: 130.05 – 130.14 Mb	Chr 2: 31.04 – 31.11 Mb
PubMed search
- Wikidata
View/Edit Human	View/Edit Mouse

Protein GPR107 is a protein that in humans is encoded by the GPR107 gene.
