= SIT1 =

Protein-coding gene in the species Homo sapiens

Identifiers
- Aliases: SIT1, SIT, SIT-R, signaling threshold regulating transmembrane adaptor 1
- External IDs: OMIM: 604964; MGI: 1889342; HomoloGene: 8694; GeneCards: SIT1; OMA:SIT1 - orthologs

Gene location (Human)
Chr.	Chromosome 9 (human)
Band	9p13.3	Start	35,649,295 bp
Band	9p13.3	End	35,650,931 bp

Gene location (Mouse)
Chr.	Chromosome 4 (mouse)
Band	4|4 A5	Start	43,482,081 bp
Band	4|4 A5	End	43,483,734 bp
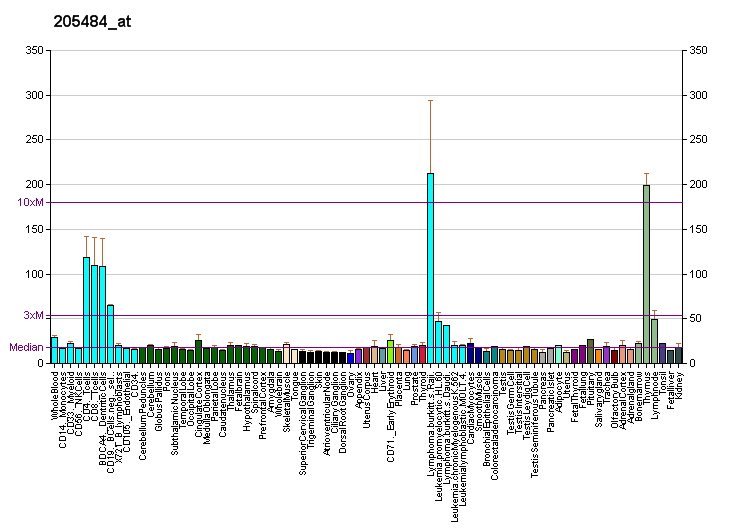
RNA expression pattern
Bgee	Human / Mouse (ortholog); Top expressed in: granulocyte; lymph node; blood; spleen; thymus; appendix; superficial temporal artery; bone marrow cell; tonsil; mucosa of transverse colon / Top expressed in: thymus; mesenteric lymph nodes; embryo; embryo; blood; spleen; subcutaneous adipose tissue; lumbar subsegment of spinal cord; granulocyte; epiblast; More reference expression data
BioGPS	More reference expression data
Gene ontology
Molecular function	protein binding; SH2 domain binding; kinase binding
Cellular component	integral component of membrane; integral component of plasma membrane; plasma membrane; extracellular exosome; membrane
Biological process	adaptive immune response; immune system process; T cell homeostasis; regulation of T cell activation; signal transduction
Sources:Amigo / QuickGO
Orthologs
Species	Human	Mouse
Entrez	27240	54390
Ensembl	ENSG00000137078	ENSMUSG00000028460
UniProt	Q9Y3P8	Q8C503
RefSeq (mRNA)	NM_014450	NM_019436
RefSeq (protein)	NP_055265	NP_062309
Location (UCSC)	Chr 9: 35.65 – 35.65 Mb	Chr 4: 43.48 – 43.48 Mb
PubMed search
- Wikidata
View/Edit Human	View/Edit Mouse

Signaling threshold-regulating transmembrane adapter 1 is a protein that in humans is encoded by the SIT1 gene.
