= MIR181A2 host gene =

Non-coding human RNA

MIR181A2HG

Identifiers
- Aliases: MIR181A2HG, MIR181A2 host gene
- External IDs: GeneCards: MIR181A2HG; OMA:MIR181A2HG - orthologs

Gene location (Human)
Chr.	Chromosome 9 (human)
Band	9q33.3	Start	124,658,412 bp
Band	9q33.3	End	124,698,631 bp
RNA expression pattern
Bgee	Human / Mouse (ortholog); Top expressed in: gonad; testicle; corpus callosum; granulocyte; right lobe of thyroid gland; ventricular zone; stromal cell of endometrium; left lobe of thyroid gland; bone marrow cell; ganglionic eminence / n/a; More reference expression data
BioGPS	n/a
Orthologs
Species	Human	Mouse
Entrez	100379345	n/a
Ensembl	ENSG00000224020	n/a
UniProt	n a	n/a
RefSeq (mRNA)	n/a	n/a
RefSeq (protein)	n/a	n/a
Location (UCSC)	Chr 9: 124.66 – 124.7 Mb	n/a
PubMed search		n/a
- Wikidata
View/Edit Human

MIR181A2 host gene is a protein that in humans is encoded by the MIR181A2HG gene.
