= Caspase activity and apoptosis inhibitor 1 =

Protein found in humans

CAAP1

Identifiers
- Aliases: CAAP1, C9orf82, CAAP, caspase activity and apoptosis inhibitor 1
- External IDs: MGI: 1915020; HomoloGene: 32607; GeneCards: CAAP1; OMA:CAAP1 - orthologs

Gene location (Human)
Chr.	Chromosome 9 (human)
Band	9p21.2	Start	26,840,685 bp
Band	9p21.2	End	26,892,803 bp

Gene location (Mouse)
Chr.	Chromosome 4 (mouse)
Band	4|4 C5	Start	94,388,318 bp
Band	4|4 C5	End	94,445,033 bp
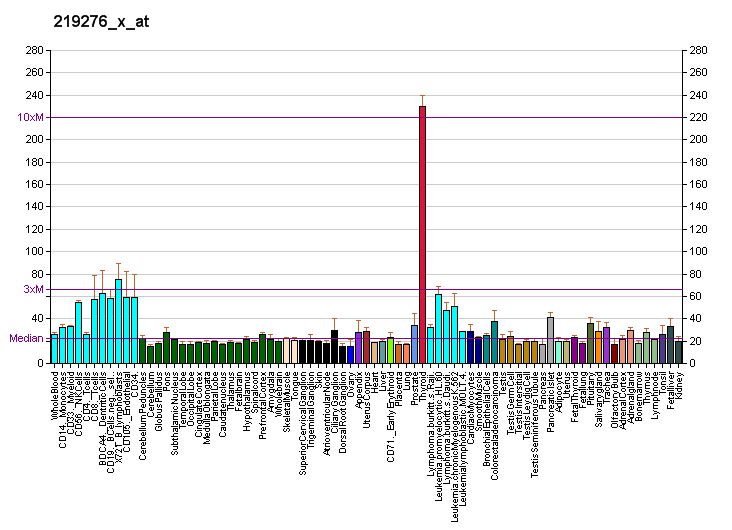
RNA expression pattern
Bgee	Human / Mouse (ortholog); Top expressed in: mucosa of sigmoid colon; Epithelium of choroid plexus; corpus epididymis; caput epididymis; secondary oocyte; jejunal mucosa; retinal pigment epithelium; rectum; mucosa of paranasal sinus; oral cavity / Top expressed in: lacrimal gland; primitive streak; cumulus cell; abdominal wall; pineal gland; medial ganglionic eminence; olfactory epithelium; epiblast; Paneth cell; trigeminal ganglion; More reference expression data
BioGPS	More reference expression data
Orthologs
Species	Human	Mouse
Entrez	79886	67770
Ensembl	ENSG00000120159	ENSMUSG00000028578
UniProt	Q9H8G2	Q8VDY9
RefSeq (mRNA)	NM_001167575; NM_024828	NM_026368
RefSeq (protein)	NP_001161047; NP_079104	NP_080644; NP_001393278; NP_001393279; NP_001393280
Location (UCSC)	Chr 9: 26.84 – 26.89 Mb	Chr 4: 94.39 – 94.45 Mb
PubMed search
- Wikidata
View/Edit Human	View/Edit Mouse

Caspase activity and apoptosis inhibitor 1 is a protein that in humans is encoded by the CAAP1 gene.

== See also ==
- Caspase
- Apoptosis
