= Hardcastle syndrome =

- Other names: Bone dysplasia-medullary fibrosarcoma syndrome, diaphyseal medullary stenosis-malignant fibrous histiocytoma syndrome
- Hardcastle syndrome is inherited in an autosomal dominant pattern.

Hardcastle syndrome is a rare genetic disorder on chromosome 9 at 9p22-p21. It affects the long bones. There is a high risk for histiocytoma.
