= SARDH =

Protein-coding gene in the species Homo sapiens

Identifiers
- Aliases: SARDH, BPR-2, DMGDHL1, SAR, SARD, SDH, sarcosine dehydrogenase
- External IDs: OMIM: 604455; MGI: 2183102; HomoloGene: 5149; GeneCards: SARDH; OMA:SARDH - orthologs

Gene location (Human)
Chr.	Chromosome 9 (human)
Band	9q34.2	Start	133,663,560 bp
Band	9q34.2	End	133,739,955 bp

Gene location (Mouse)
Chr.	Chromosome 2 (mouse)
Band	2|2 A3	Start	27,078,405 bp
Band	2|2 A3	End	27,138,349 bp
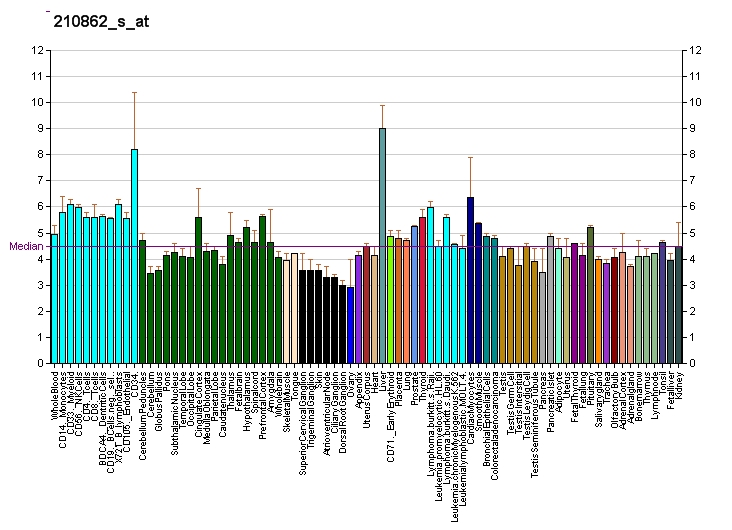

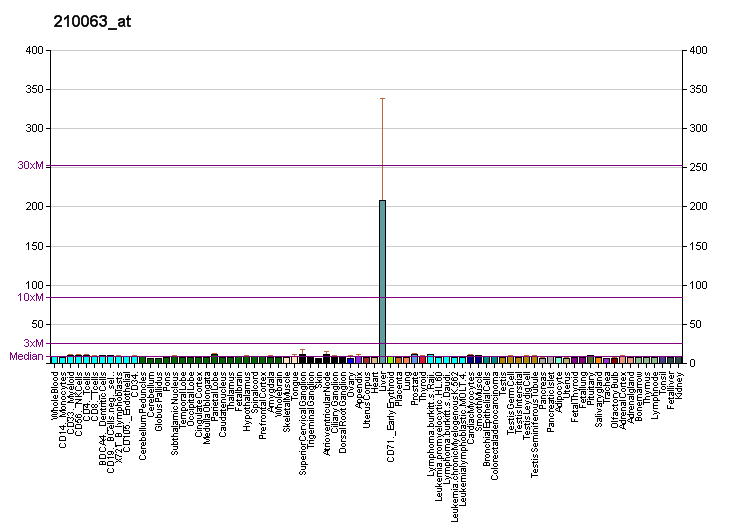

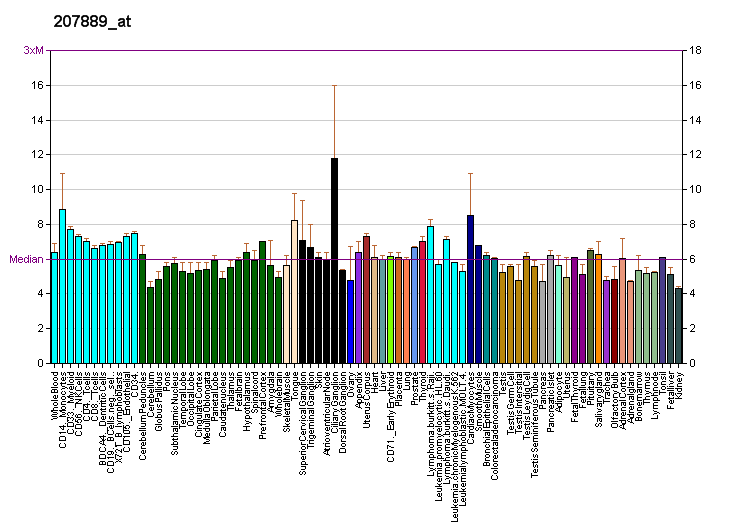
RNA expression pattern
Bgee	Human / Mouse (ortholog); Top expressed in: right lobe of liver; buccal mucosa cell; body of pancreas; corpus epididymis; human kidney; testicle; granulocyte; ventricular zone; sural nerve; ganglionic eminence / Top expressed in: left lobe of liver; right kidney; proximal tubule; human kidney; yolk sac; external carotid artery; major salivary gland; parotid gland; lip; internal carotid artery; More reference expression data
BioGPS	More reference expression data
Gene ontology
Molecular function	oxidoreductase activity; sarcosine dehydrogenase activity
Cellular component	mitochondrion; mitochondrial matrix; cytoplasm
Biological process	choline catabolic process; sarcosine catabolic process
Sources:Amigo / QuickGO
Orthologs
Species	Human	Mouse
Entrez	1757	192166
Ensembl	ENSG00000123453	ENSMUSG00000009614
UniProt	Q9UL12	Q99LB7
RefSeq (mRNA)	NM_001134707; NM_007101	NM_138665
RefSeq (protein)	NP_001128179; NP_009032	NP_619606
Location (UCSC)	Chr 9: 133.66 – 133.74 Mb	Chr 2: 27.08 – 27.14 Mb
PubMed search
- Wikidata
View/Edit Human	View/Edit Mouse

Sarcosine dehydrogenase, mitochondrial is an enzyme that in humans is encoded by the SARDH gene.
