= PRUNE2 =

Protein-coding gene in the species Homo sapiens

Identifiers
- Aliases: PRUNE2, A214N16.3, BMCC1, BNIPXL, C9orf65, KIAA0367, bA214N16.3, prune homolog 2 (Drosophila), prune homolog 2, prune homolog 2 with BCH domain
- External IDs: OMIM: 610691; MGI: 1925004; GeneCards: PRUNE2

Gene location (Human)
Chr.	Chromosome 9 (human)
Band	9q21.2	Start	76,611,376 bp
Band	9q21.2	End	76,906,114 bp

Gene location (Mouse)
Chr.	Chromosome 19 (mouse)
Band	19|19 B	Start	16,933,482 bp
Band	19|19 B	End	17,201,296 bp
RNA expression pattern
Bgee	Human / Mouse (ortholog); Top expressed in: spinal ganglia; decidua; gastric mucosa; Descending thoracic aorta; endothelial cell; cerebellar vermis; popliteal artery; tibial arteries; ascending aorta; corpus callosum / Top expressed in: facial motor nucleus; cerebellar cortex; lobe of cerebellum; medial dorsal nucleus; spinal ganglia; cerebellar vermis; lumbar spinal ganglion; trigeminal ganglion; lateral geniculate nucleus; medial geniculate nucleus; More reference expression data
BioGPS	n/a
Gene ontology
Molecular function	pyrophosphatase activity; metal ion binding; exopolyphosphatase activity
Cellular component	cytoplasm
Biological process	apoptotic process; polyphosphate catabolic process
Sources:Amigo / QuickGO
Orthologs
Databases	NCBI: entry; OMA: entry
Species	Human	Mouse
Entrez	158471	353211
Ensembl	ENSG00000106772	ENSMUSG00000039126
UniProt	Q8WUY3	Q52KR3
RefSeq (mRNA)	NM_001308047; NM_001308048; NM_001308049; NM_001308050; NM_001308051 NM_015225; NM_138818; NM_001330680	NM_181348
RefSeq (protein)	NP_001294976; NP_001294977; NP_001294978; NP_001294979; NP_001294980 NP_001317609; NP_056040; NP_001294976.1; NP_001294977.1	NP_851993
Location (UCSC)	Chr 9: 76.61 – 76.91 Mb	Chr 19: 16.93 – 17.2 Mb
PubMed search
- Wikidata
View/Edit Human	View/Edit Mouse

Protein prune homolog 2 is a protein that in humans is encoded by the PRUNE2 gene.
