= NUDT2 =

Protein-coding gene in the species Homo sapiens

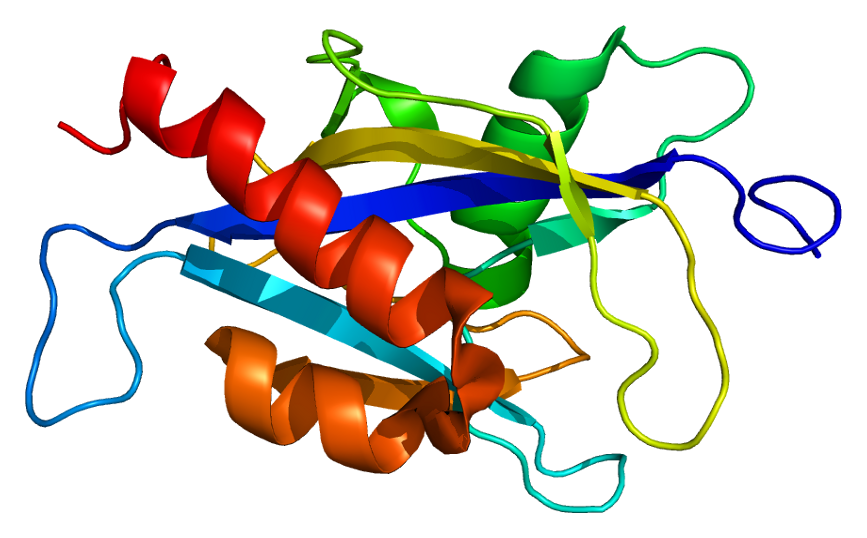
Available structures
PDB	Ortholog search: PDBe RCSB
PDB	List of PDB id codes 1XSA, 1XSB, 1XSC, 3U53, 4ICK, 4IJX

Identifiers
- Aliases: NUDT2, APAH1, nudix hydrolase 2, IDDPN
- External IDs: OMIM: 602852; MGI: 1913651; HomoloGene: 896; GeneCards: NUDT2; OMA:NUDT2 - orthologs

Gene location (Human)
Chr.	Chromosome 9 (human)
Band	9p13.3	Start	34,329,506 bp
Band	9p13.3	End	34,343,711 bp

Gene location (Mouse)
Chr.	Chromosome 4 (mouse)
Band	4|4 A5	Start	41,465,151 bp
Band	4|4 A5	End	41,480,926 bp
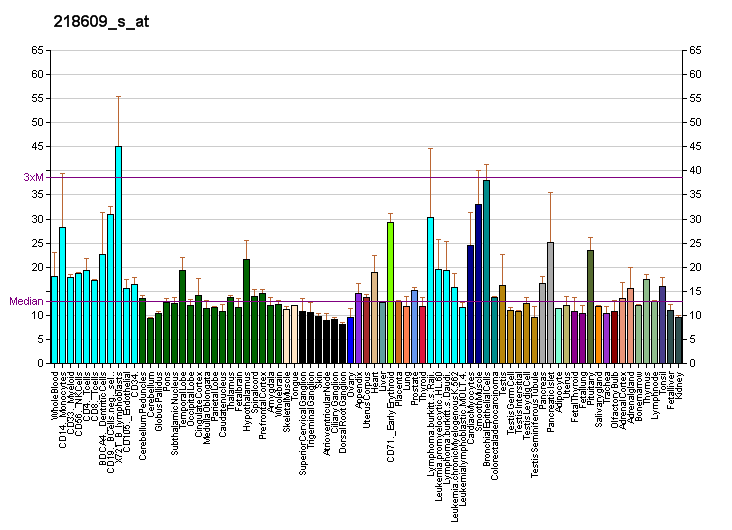
RNA expression pattern
Bgee	Human / Mouse (ortholog); Top expressed in: stromal cell of endometrium; C1 segment; islet of Langerhans; apex of heart; right adrenal cortex; body of pancreas; left adrenal cortex; prefrontal cortex; nucleus accumbens; muscle of thigh / Top expressed in: barrel cortex; facial motor nucleus; olfactory epithelium; saccule; migratory enteric neural crest cell; intercostal muscle; ectoderm; otic vesicle; otic placode; atrioventricular valve; More reference expression data
BioGPS	More reference expression data
Gene ontology
Molecular function	nucleotide binding; bis(5'-nucleosyl)-tetraphosphatase activity; GTP binding; bis(5'-nucleosyl)-tetraphosphatase (symmetrical) activity; protein binding; hydrolase activity; bis(5'-nucleosyl)-tetraphosphatase (asymmetrical) activity
Cellular component	mitochondrial matrix
Biological process	nucleobase-containing compound metabolic process; apoptotic process; cellular response to oxidative stress
Sources:Amigo / QuickGO
Orthologs
Species	Human	Mouse
Entrez	318	66401
Ensembl	ENSG00000164978	ENSMUSG00000028443
UniProt	P50583	P56380
RefSeq (mRNA)	NM_147173; NM_001161; NM_001244390; NM_147172	NM_025539
RefSeq (protein)	NP_001152; NP_001231319; NP_671701; NP_671702	NP_079815
Location (UCSC)	Chr 9: 34.33 – 34.34 Mb	Chr 4: 41.47 – 41.48 Mb
PubMed search
- Wikidata
View/Edit Human	View/Edit Mouse

Bis(5'-nucleosyl)-tetraphosphatase [asymmetrical] is an enzyme that in humans is encoded by the NUDT2 gene.

This gene encodes a member of the MutT family of nucleotide pyrophosphatases, a subset of the larger NUDIX hydrolase family. The gene product possesses a modification of the MutT sequence motif found in certain nucleotide pyrophosphatases. The enzyme asymmetrically hydrolyzes Ap4A to yield AMP and ATP and is responsible for maintaining the intracellular level of the dinucleotide Ap4A, the function of which has yet to be established. This gene may be a candidate tumor suppressor gene. Alternative splicing has been observed at this locus and three transcript variants, all encoding the same protein, have been identified.
