= ISCA1 =

Protein-coding gene in the species Homo sapiens

Identifiers
- Aliases: ISCA1, HBLD2, ISA1, hIscA, iron-sulfur cluster assembly 1, MMDS5
- External IDs: OMIM: 611006; MGI: 1916296; GeneCards: ISCA1

Gene location (Human)
| Chr. | Chromosome 9 (human) |
| Band | 9q21.33 | Start | 86,264,546 bp |
| Band | 9q21.33 | End | 86,283,102 bp |

Gene location (Mouse)
| Chr. | Chromosome 13 (mouse) |
| Band | 13|13 B2 | Start | 59,903,223 bp |
| Band | 13|13 B2 | End | 59,917,624 bp |
RNA expression pattern
| Bgee | Human / Mouse (ortholog); Top expressed in: endothelial cell; biceps brachii; Skeletal muscle tissue of biceps brachii; right ventricle; trabecular bone; kidney tubule; Epithelium of choroid plexus; pons; myocardium; Brodmann area 23 / Top expressed in: bone marrow; brown adipose tissue; tibialis anterior muscle; soleus muscle; quadriceps femoris muscle; masseter muscle; extraocular muscle; myocardium of ventricle; muscle of thigh; cardiac muscles; More reference expression data |
| BioGPS | n/a |
Gene ontology
| Molecular function | iron-sulfur cluster binding; ferrous iron binding; structural molecule activity; metal ion binding; 2 iron, 2 sulfur cluster binding |
| Cellular component | mitochondrion; mitochondrial matrix |
| Biological process | iron-sulfur cluster assembly; protein maturation by iron-sulfur cluster transfer; small molecule metabolic process |
Sources:Amigo / QuickGO
Orthologs
| Databases | NCBI: entry; OMA: entry |
| Species | Human | Mouse |
| Entrez | 81689 | 69046 |
| Ensembl | ENSG00000135070 | ENSMUSG00000044792 |
| UniProt | Q9BUE6 | Q9D924 |
| RefSeq (mRNA) | NM_030940 | NM_026921 |
| RefSeq (protein) | NP_112202 | NP_081197 |
| Location (UCSC) | Chr 9: 86.26 – 86.28 Mb | Chr 13: 59.9 – 59.92 Mb |
| PubMed search |
- Wikidata
| View/Edit Human | View/Edit Mouse |

Iron-sulfur cluster assembly 1 homolog, mitochondrial is an evolutionarily highly conserved protein for the biogenesis of iron-sulfur cluster across species. In humans it is encoded by the ISCA1 gene.
