= Microseminoprotein, prostate associated =

Protein-coding gene in the species Homo sapiens

MSMP

Identifiers
- Aliases: MSMP, PSMP, microseminoprotein, prostate associated
- External IDs: OMIM: 612191; MGI: 3652339; HomoloGene: 88113; GeneCards: MSMP; OMA:MSMP - orthologs

Gene location (Human)
Chr.	Chromosome 9 (human)
Band	9p13.3	Start	35,752,990 bp
Band	9p13.3	End	35,756,613 bp

Gene location (Mouse)
Chr.	Chromosome 4 (mouse)
Band	4|4 A5	Start	43,583,216 bp
Band	4|4 A5	End	43,584,494 bp
RNA expression pattern
Bgee	Human / Mouse (ortholog); Top expressed in: testicle; gonad; placenta; Descending thoracic aorta; tonsil; ascending aorta; muscle of thigh; lymph node; hypothalamus; cerebellar hemisphere / Top expressed in: tail of embryo; morula; primary oocyte; embryo; secondary oocyte; right kidney; blastocyst; neural tube; human kidney; limb; More reference expression data
BioGPS	n/a
Gene ontology
Molecular function	molecular function
Cellular component	cytoplasm; extracellular region; extracellular space
Biological process	biological process
Sources:Amigo / QuickGO
Orthologs
Species	Human	Mouse
Entrez	692094	100039672
Ensembl	ENSG00000215183	ENSMUSG00000078719
UniProt	Q1L6U9	B1AWI6
RefSeq (mRNA)	NM_001044264	NM_001099314
RefSeq (protein)	NP_001037729	NP_001092784
Location (UCSC)	Chr 9: 35.75 – 35.76 Mb	Chr 4: 43.58 – 43.58 Mb
PubMed search
- Wikidata
View/Edit Human	View/Edit Mouse

Microseminoprotein, prostate associated is a protein that in humans is encoded by the MSMP gene.

== Function ==
This gene encodes a member of the beta-microseminoprotein family. Members of this protein family contain ten conserved cysteine residues that form intra-molecular disulfide bonds. The encoded protein may play a role in prostate cancer tumorigenesis.
