= SPIN1 =

Protein-coding gene in the species Homo sapiens

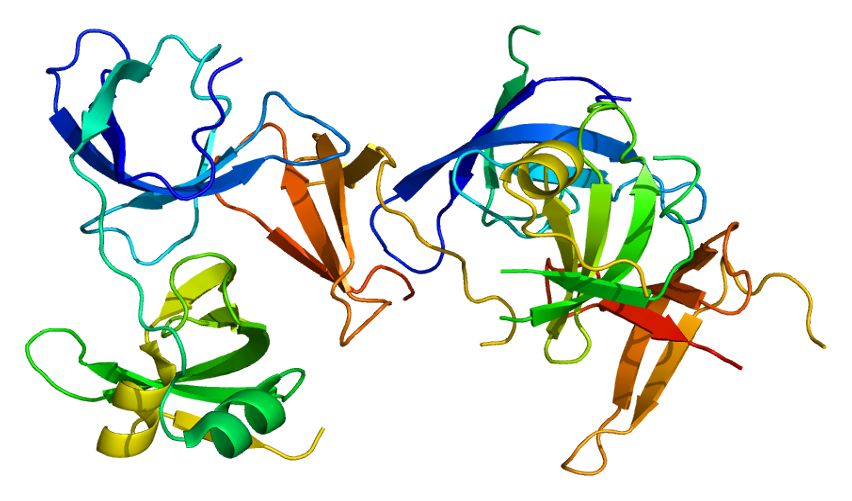

Identifiers
- Aliases: SPIN1, SPIN, TDRD24, spindlin 1
- External IDs: OMIM: 609936; MGI: 109242; GeneCards: SPIN1
Available structures
PDB	Ortholog search: PDBe RCSB
PDB	List of PDB id codes 2NS2, 4H75, 4MZF, 4MZG, 4MZH

Gene location (Human)
Chr.	Chromosome 9 (human)
Band	9q22.1	Start	88,388,430 bp
Band	9q22.1	End	88,478,694 bp

Gene location (Mouse)
Chr.	Chromosome 13 (mouse)
Band	13 A5|13 26.04 cM	Start	51,254,916 bp
Band	13 A5|13 26.04 cM	End	51,306,582 bp
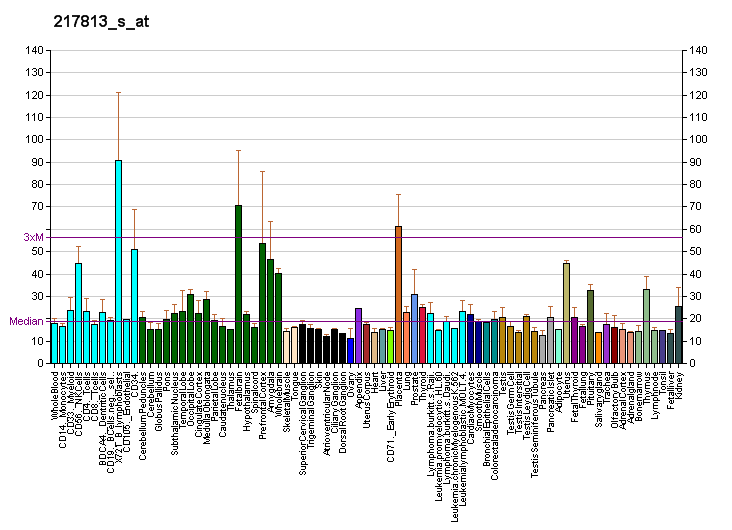
RNA expression pattern
Bgee	Human / Mouse (ortholog); Top expressed in: postcentral gyrus; caput epididymis; corpus epididymis; superior vestibular nucleus; middle temporal gyrus; entorhinal cortex; Brodmann area 23; seminal vesicula; renal medulla; superior frontal gyrus / Top expressed in: primary oocyte; secondary oocyte; zygote; fossa; condyle; motor neuron; Paneth cell; substantia nigra; Rostral migratory stream; facial motor nucleus; More reference expression data
BioGPS	More reference expression data
Gene ontology
Molecular function	methylated histone binding; protein binding
Cellular component	nucleus; spindle; nucleolus; nucleoplasm; cytosol; nuclear membrane
Biological process	multicellular organism development; Wnt signaling pathway; cell cycle; meiosis; rRNA transcription; gamete generation; positive regulation of Wnt signaling pathway; positive regulation of transcription, DNA-templated; chromatin organization
Sources:Amigo / QuickGO
Orthologs
Databases	NCBI: entry; OMA: entry
Species	Human	Mouse
Entrez	10927	20729
Ensembl	ENSG00000106723	ENSMUSG00000021395
UniProt	Q9Y657	Q61142
RefSeq (mRNA)	NM_006717	NM_001283028; NM_001283029; NM_001283030; NM_011462; NM_146043
RefSeq (protein)	NP_006708	NP_001269957; NP_001269958; NP_001269959; NP_035592; NP_666155
Location (UCSC)	Chr 9: 88.39 – 88.48 Mb	Chr 13: 51.25 – 51.31 Mb
PubMed search
- Wikidata
View/Edit Human	View/Edit Mouse

Spindlin-1 is a protein that in humans is encoded by the SPIN1 gene.
