= Allograft inflammatory factor 1-like =

Protein-coding gene in the species Homo sapiens

AIF1L

Identifiers
- Aliases: AIF1L, C9orf58, IBA2, allograft inflammatory factor 1 like
- External IDs: MGI: 1919598; GeneCards: AIF1L
Available structures
PDB	Ortholog search: PDBe RCSB
PDB	List of PDB id codes 2JJZ, 2VTG

Gene location (Human)
Chr.	Chromosome 9 (human)
Band	9q34.12-q34.13	Start	131,096,476 bp
Band	9q34.12-q34.13	End	131,123,152 bp

Gene location (Mouse)
Chr.	Chromosome 2 (mouse)
Band	2|2 B	Start	31,840,151 bp
Band	2|2 B	End	31,863,454 bp
RNA expression pattern
Bgee	Human / Mouse (ortholog); Top expressed in: renal medulla; C1 segment; inferior ganglion of vagus nerve; human kidney; spleen; internal globus pallidus; ventral tegmental area; medulla oblongata; ventricular zone; substantia nigra / Top expressed in: decidua; stria vascularis; cumulus cell; ciliary body; subiculum; Region I of hippocampus proper; retinal pigment epithelium; maxillary prominence; piriform cortex; superior colliculus; More reference expression data
BioGPS	n/a
Gene ontology
Molecular function	calcium ion binding; actin filament binding; actin binding; metal ion binding
Cellular component	cytoplasm; actin cytoskeleton; ruffle membrane; plasma membrane; cell projection; extracellular exosome; cytoskeleton; membrane; focal adhesion; actin filament; protein-containing complex
Biological process	actin filament bundle assembly; ruffle assembly
Sources:Amigo / QuickGO
Orthologs
Databases	NCBI: entry; OMA: entry
Species	Human	Mouse
Entrez	83543	108897
Ensembl	ENSG00000126878	ENSMUSG00000001864
UniProt	Q9BQI0	Q9EQX4
RefSeq (mRNA)	NM_001002260; NM_001185095; NM_001185096; NM_031426	NM_145144
RefSeq (protein)	NP_001172024; NP_001172025; NP_113614	NP_660126
Location (UCSC)	Chr 9: 131.1 – 131.12 Mb	Chr 2: 31.84 – 31.86 Mb
PubMed search
- Wikidata
View/Edit Human	View/Edit Mouse

Allograft inflammatory factor 1-like is a protein that is encoded by the AIF1L gene in humans.

AIF1L is an actin-binding protein that promotes actin bundling. It may neither bind calcium nor depend on calcium for function. It has biased expression in kidney (RPKM 130.1), spleen (RPKM 121.3) and 8 other tissues.
