= RNF183 =

Protein-coding gene in the species Homo sapiens

Identifiers
- Aliases: RNF183, ring finger protein 183
- External IDs: MGI: 1923322; GeneCards: RNF183
Enzyme activity
EC #	BRENDA	ExPASy	KEGG	MetaCyc
2.3.2.27	↗	↗	↗	↗

Gene location (Human)
Chr.	Chromosome 9 (human)
Band	9q32	Start	113,297,093 bp
Band	9q32	End	113,303,376 bp

Gene location (Mouse)
Chr.	Chromosome 4 (mouse)
Band	4|4 B3	Start	62,345,777 bp
Band	4|4 B3	End	62,353,489 bp
RNA expression pattern
Bgee	Human / Mouse (ortholog); Top expressed in: pancreatic ductal cell; corpus epididymis; buccal mucosa cell; caput epididymis; nasal epithelium; testicle; gallbladder; human kidney; palpebral conjunctiva; gonad / Top expressed in: right kidney; human kidney; blastocyst; proximal tubule; olfactory epithelium; embryo; neural layer of retina; yolk sac; thymus; duodenum; More reference expression data
BioGPS	n/a
Gene ontology
Molecular function	protein binding; metal ion binding; ubiquitin protein ligase activity; transferase activity
Cellular component	membrane; integral component of membrane; endoplasmic reticulum; lysosome; lysosomal membrane; endoplasmic reticulum membrane; Golgi apparatus; integral component of endoplasmic reticulum membrane; cis-Golgi network membrane
Biological process	protein polyubiquitination; protein ubiquitination; apoptotic process; response to endoplasmic reticulum stress; protein autoubiquitination; positive regulation of endoplasmic reticulum stress-induced intrinsic apoptotic signaling pathway
Sources:Amigo / QuickGO
Orthologs
Databases	NCBI: entry; OMA: entry
Species	Human	Mouse
Entrez	138065	76072
Ensembl	ENSG00000165188	ENSMUSG00000063851
UniProt	Q96D59	Q8QZS5
RefSeq (mRNA)	NM_145051; NM_001371234; NM_001371235; NM_001371236; NM_001371237 NM_001387568; NM_001387569	NM_153504; NM_001379623; NM_001379624; NM_001379625
RefSeq (protein)	NP_659488; NP_001358163; NP_001358164; NP_001358165; NP_001358166	NP_705724; NP_001366552; NP_001366553; NP_001366554
Location (UCSC)	Chr 9: 113.3 – 113.3 Mb	Chr 4: 62.35 – 62.35 Mb
PubMed search
- Wikidata
View/Edit Human	View/Edit Mouse

Ring finger protein 183 is a protein in humans that is encoded by the RNF183 gene.
