= FAM120A =

Protein-coding gene in the species Homo sapiens

Identifiers
- Aliases: FAM120A, C9orf10, DNAPTP1, DNAPTP5, OSSA, family with sequence similarity 120A, HBVPTPAP
- External IDs: OMIM: 612265; MGI: 2446163; HomoloGene: 8752; GeneCards: FAM120A; OMA:FAM120A - orthologs

Gene location (Human)
Chr.	Chromosome 9 (human)
Band	9q22.31	Start	93,451,685 bp
Band	9q22.31	End	93,566,112 bp

Gene location (Mouse)
Chr.	Chromosome 13 (mouse)
Band	13|13 A5	Start	49,032,695 bp
Band	13|13 A5	End	49,121,493 bp
RNA expression pattern
Bgee	Human / Mouse (ortholog); Top expressed in: tibia; mucosa of sigmoid colon; visceral pleura; parietal pleura; pylorus; palpebral conjunctiva; Epithelium of choroid plexus; bronchial epithelial cell; germinal epithelium; gingival epithelium / Top expressed in: ciliary body; retinal pigment epithelium; migratory enteric neural crest cell; endothelial cell of lymphatic vessel; ureter; crypt of lieberkuhn of small intestine; decidua; conjunctival fornix; vas deferens; iris; More reference expression data
BioGPS	n/a
Orthologs
Species	Human	Mouse
Entrez	23196	218236
Ensembl	ENSG00000048828	ENSMUSG00000038014
UniProt	Q9NZB2	Q6A0A9
RefSeq (mRNA)	NM_001286722; NM_001286723; NM_001286724; NM_014612	NM_001033268
RefSeq (protein)	NP_001273651; NP_001273652; NP_001273653; NP_055427	NP_001028440
Location (UCSC)	Chr 9: 93.45 – 93.57 Mb	Chr 13: 49.03 – 49.12 Mb
PubMed search
- Wikidata
View/Edit Human	View/Edit Mouse

Constitutive coactivator of PPAR-gamma-like protein 1 is a protein that in humans is encoded by the FAM120A gene.
