= C9orf78 =

Protein-coding gene in the species Homo sapiens

Identifiers
- Aliases: C9orf78, HCA59, HSPC220, bA409K20.3, chromosome 9 open reading frame 78, CSU2, TLS1
- External IDs: MGI: 2385132; GeneCards: C9orf78

Gene location (Human)
Chr.	Chromosome 9 (human)
Band	9q34.11	Start	129,827,290 bp
Band	9q34.11	End	129,835,863 bp

Gene location (Mouse)
Chr.	Chromosome 2 (mouse)
Band	2|2 B	Start	30,862,189 bp
Band	2|2 B	End	30,872,213 bp
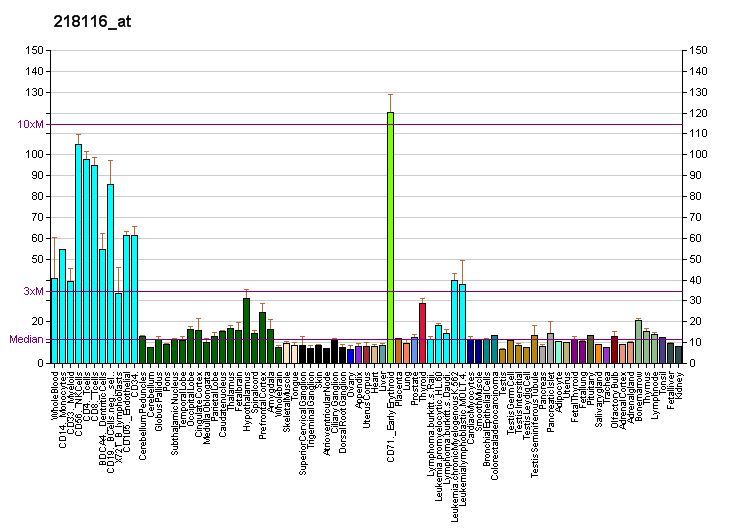
RNA expression pattern
Bgee	Human / Mouse (ortholog); Top expressed in: monocyte; Achilles tendon; C1 segment; gastrocnemius muscle; anterior cingulate cortex; tibial arteries; Descending thoracic aorta; gonad; stromal cell of endometrium; gastric mucosa / Top expressed in: neural layer of retina; dentate gyrus of hippocampal formation granule cell; cerebellum; hypothalamus; olfactory bulb; tail of embryo; cerebellar cortex; granulocyte; ovary; superior frontal gyrus; More reference expression data
BioGPS	More reference expression data
Gene ontology
Molecular function	protein binding
Cellular component	nucleoplasm; cytosol; nucleus; spliceosomal complex
Biological process	regulation of mRNA splicing, via spliceosome
Sources:Amigo / QuickGO
Orthologs
Databases	NCBI: entry; OMA: entry
Species	Human	Mouse
Entrez	51759	227707
Ensembl	ENSG00000136819	ENSMUSG00000026851
UniProt	Q9NZ63	Q3TQI7
RefSeq (mRNA)	NM_016520	NM_144885
RefSeq (protein)	NP_057604	NP_659134
Location (UCSC)	Chr 9: 129.83 – 129.84 Mb	Chr 2: 30.86 – 30.87 Mb
PubMed search
- Wikidata
View/Edit Human	View/Edit Mouse

Uncharacterized protein C9orf78 is a protein that in humans is encoded by the C9orf78 gene.
