= ZNF367 =

Protein-coding gene in humans

Identifiers
- Aliases: ZNF367, AFF29, CDC14B, ZFF29, zinc finger protein 367
- External IDs: OMIM: 610160; MGI: 2442266; GeneCards: ZNF367

Gene location (Human)
Chr.	Chromosome 9 (human)
Band	9q22.32|9q22.32	Start	96,385,941 bp
Band	9q22.32|9q22.32	End	96,418,370 bp

Gene location (Mouse)
Chr.	Chromosome 13 (mouse)
Band	13|13 B3	Start	64,280,832 bp
Band	13|13 B3	End	64,301,016 bp
RNA expression pattern
Bgee	Human / Mouse (ortholog); Top expressed in: thymus; ventricular zone; trabecular bone; bone marrow; gonad; mucosa of ileum; ganglionic eminence; testicle; mucosa of sigmoid colon; monocyte / Top expressed in: spermatocyte; atrium; spermatid; medial ganglionic eminence; tibialis anterior muscle; human fetus; hand; vastus lateralis muscle; triceps brachii muscle; pineal gland; More reference expression data
BioGPS	n/a
Gene ontology
Molecular function	DNA-binding transcription factor activity; DNA binding; metal ion binding; nucleic acid binding; DNA-binding transcription factor activity, RNA polymerase II-specific
Cellular component	nucleus; nucleoplasm
Biological process	regulation of transcription by RNA polymerase II; regulation of transcription, DNA-templated; transcription, DNA-templated
Sources:Amigo / QuickGO
Orthologs
Databases	NCBI: entry; OMA: entry
Species	Human	Mouse
Entrez	195828	238673
Ensembl	ENSG00000165244	ENSMUSG00000044934
UniProt	Q7RTV3	Q0VDT2
RefSeq (mRNA)	NM_153695	NM_175494; NM_001361047
RefSeq (protein)	NP_710162	NP_780703; NP_001347976
Location (UCSC)	Chr 9: 96.39 – 96.42 Mb	Chr 13: 64.28 – 64.3 Mb
PubMed search
- Wikidata
View/Edit Human	View/Edit Mouse

Zinc finger protein 367 is a protein that in humans is encoded by the ZNF367 gene. The human gene is also known as ZFF29 and CDC14B; the orthologue in mice is Zfp367. ZNF367 contains a unique Cys2His2 zinc finger motif and is a member of the zinc finger protein family.
