= PHPT1 =

Protein-coding gene in the species Homo sapiens

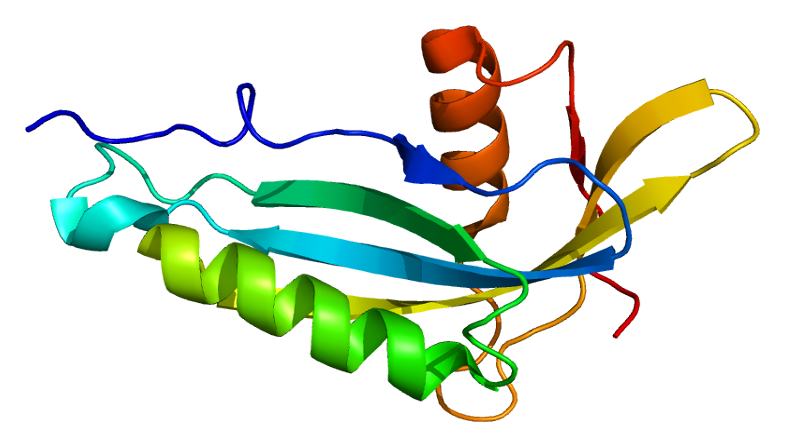

Identifiers
- Aliases: PHPT1, CGI-202, HEL-S-132P, HSPC141, PHP14, phosphohistidine phosphatase 1, PHP
- External IDs: OMIM: 610167; MGI: 1922704; GeneCards: PHPT1
Available structures
PDB	Ortholog search: PDBe RCSB
PDB	List of PDB id codes 2AI6, 2HW4, 2NMM, 2OZW, 2OZX
Enzyme activity
EC #	BRENDA	ExPASy	KEGG	MetaCyc
3.9.1.3	↗	↗	↗	↗

Gene location (Human)
Chr.	Chromosome 9 (human)
Band	9q34.3	Start	136,848,724 bp
Band	9q34.3	End	136,851,027 bp

Gene location (Mouse)
Chr.	Chromosome 2 (mouse)
Band	2|2 A3	Start	25,463,442 bp
Band	2|2 A3	End	25,465,236 bp
RNA expression pattern
Bgee	Human / Mouse (ortholog); Top expressed in: apex of heart; muscle of thigh; anterior pituitary; right adrenal gland; right adrenal cortex; right auricle of heart; body of pancreas; right hemisphere of cerebellum; left adrenal cortex; C1 segment / Top expressed in: lens; yolk sac; quadriceps femoris muscle; neural tube; cerebellum; olfactory bulb; muscle tissue; neural layer of retina; cerebellar cortex; skeletal muscle tissue; More reference expression data
BioGPS	n/a
Gene ontology
Molecular function	calcium channel inhibitor activity; phosphoprotein phosphatase activity; hydrolase activity; transmembrane transporter binding; protein binding; protein histidine phosphatase activity
Cellular component	cytoplasm; cytosol; extracellular exosome
Biological process	negative regulation of lyase activity; positive regulation of insulin secretion involved in cellular response to glucose stimulus; protein dephosphorylation; regulation of actin cytoskeleton reorganization; peptidyl-histidine dephosphorylation; negative regulation of ATP citrate synthase activity; positive regulation of cell motility; negative regulation of T cell receptor signaling pathway
Sources:Amigo / QuickGO
Orthologs
Databases	NCBI: entry; OMA: entry
Species	Human	Mouse
Entrez	29085	75454
Ensembl	ENSG00000054148	ENSMUSG00000036504
UniProt	Q9NRX4	Q9DAK9
RefSeq (mRNA)	NM_001135860; NM_001135861; NM_001287342; NM_001287343; NM_014172	NM_029293
RefSeq (protein)	NP_001129333; NP_001274271; NP_001274272; NP_054891	NP_083569
Location (UCSC)	Chr 9: 136.85 – 136.85 Mb	Chr 2: 25.46 – 25.47 Mb
PubMed search
- Wikidata
View/Edit Human	View/Edit Mouse

14 kDa phosphohistidine phosphatase is an enzyme that in humans is encoded by the PHPT1 gene.
