= TRNA methyltransferase O =

Protein-coding gene in the species Homo sapiens

TRMO

Identifiers
- Aliases: TRMO, HSPC219, NAP1, C9orf156, tRNA methyltransferase O
- External IDs: MGI: 1922003; GeneCards: TRMO

Gene location (Human)
Chr.	Chromosome 9 (human)
Band	9q22.33	Start	97,904,489 bp
Band	9q22.33	End	97,922,500 bp

Gene location (Mouse)
Chr.	Chromosome 4 (mouse)
Band	4|4 B1	Start	46,376,505 bp
Band	4|4 B1	End	46,389,437 bp
RNA expression pattern
Bgee	Human / Mouse (ortholog); Top expressed in: epithelium of nasopharynx; Achilles tendon; gonad; amniotic fluid; bone marrow cell; blood; sperm; germinal epithelium; corpus callosum; mucosa of urinary bladder / Top expressed in: spermatocyte; spermatid; morula; bone marrow; embryo; epiblast; seminiferous tubule; embryo; medial ganglionic eminence; mesenteric lymph nodes; More reference expression data
BioGPS	n/a
Orthologs
Databases	NCBI: entry; OMA: entry
Species	Human	Mouse
Entrez	51531	74753
Ensembl	ENSG00000136932	ENSMUSG00000028331
UniProt	Q9BU70; Q5T111	Q562D6
RefSeq (mRNA)	NM_016481; NM_001330725; NM_001371657; NM_001371658; NM_001371659 NM_001371660; NM_001371661	NM_029086; NM_001347095
RefSeq (protein)	NP_001317654; NP_057565; NP_001358586; NP_001358587; NP_001358588 NP_001358589; NP_001358590	NP_001334024; NP_083362
Location (UCSC)	Chr 9: 97.9 – 97.92 Mb	Chr 4: 46.38 – 46.39 Mb
PubMed search
- Wikidata
View/Edit Human	View/Edit Mouse

tRNA methyltransferase O is a protein that in humans is encoded by the TRMO gene. The gene is also known as C9orf156, NAP1 and HSPC219; the orthologue in mice is 5830415F09Rik.
