= ZNF79 =

Protein-coding gene in the species Homo sapiens

Identifiers
- Aliases: ZNF79, pT7, zinc finger protein 79
- External IDs: OMIM: 194552; GeneCards: ZNF79

Gene location (Human)
Chr.	Chromosome 9 (human)
Band	9q33.3	Start	127,424,374 bp
Band	9q33.3	End	127,445,372 bp
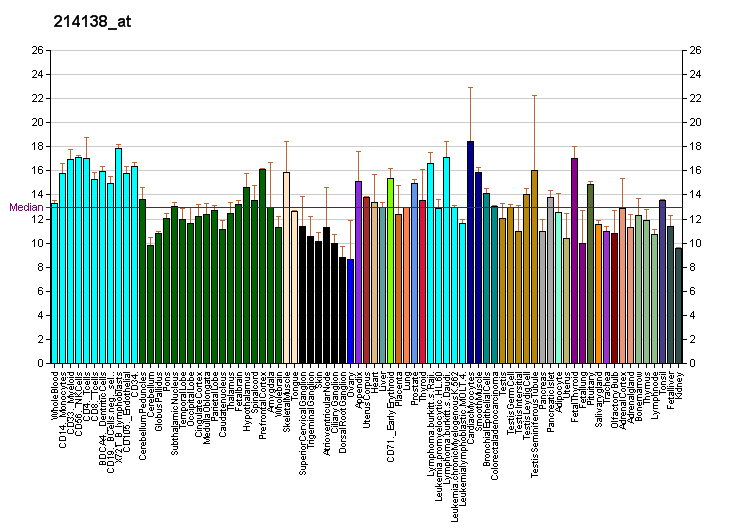

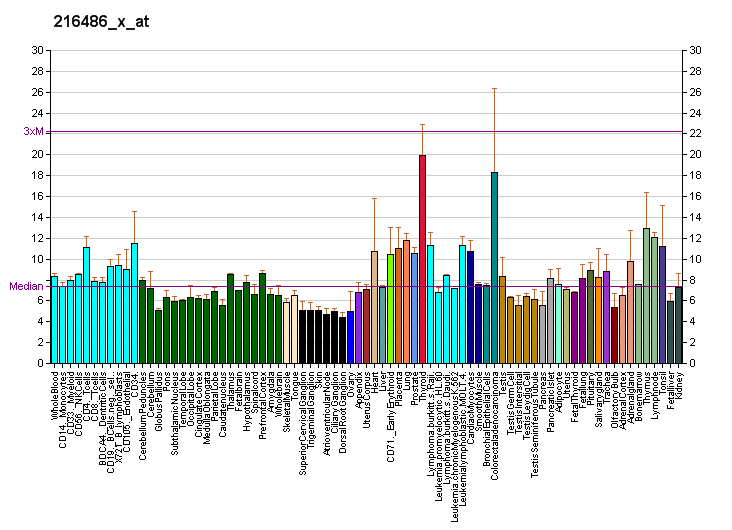
RNA expression pattern
Bgee	Human / Mouse (ortholog); Top expressed in: testicle; tendon of biceps brachii; Achilles tendon; granulocyte; stromal cell of endometrium; amniotic fluid; islet of Langerhans; internal globus pallidus; buccal mucosa cell; secondary oocyte / n/a; More reference expression data
BioGPS	More reference expression data
Gene ontology
Molecular function	DNA binding; protein binding; metal ion binding; nucleic acid binding; molecular function; DNA-binding transcription factor activity, RNA polymerase II-specific
Cellular component	intracellular anatomical structure; nucleus
Biological process	transcription, DNA-templated; regulation of transcription, DNA-templated; biological process; regulation of transcription by RNA polymerase II
Sources:Amigo / QuickGO
Orthologs
Databases	NCBI: entry; OMA: entry
Species	Human	Mouse
Entrez	7633	n/a
Ensembl	ENSG00000196152	n/a
UniProt	Q15937	n/a
RefSeq (mRNA)	NM_001286696; NM_001286697; NM_001286698; NM_007135; NM_001322260	n/a
RefSeq (protein)	NP_001273625; NP_001273626; NP_001273627; NP_001309189; NP_009066	n/a
Location (UCSC)	Chr 9: 127.42 – 127.45 Mb	n/a
PubMed search		n/a
- Wikidata
View/Edit Human

Zinc finger protein 79 is a protein that in humans is encoded by the ZNF79 gene.
