= STOML2 =

Protein-coding gene in the species Homo sapiens

Identifiers
- Aliases: STOML2, SLP-2, HSPC108, stomatin like 2
- External IDs: OMIM: 608292; MGI: 1913842; HomoloGene: 8389; GeneCards: STOML2; OMA:STOML2 - orthologs

Gene location (Human)
Chr.	Chromosome 9 (human)
Band	9p13.3	Start	35,099,776 bp
Band	9p13.3	End	35,103,195 bp

Gene location (Mouse)
Chr.	Chromosome 4 (mouse)
Band	4|4 A5	Start	43,027,690 bp
Band	4|4 A5	End	43,031,710 bp
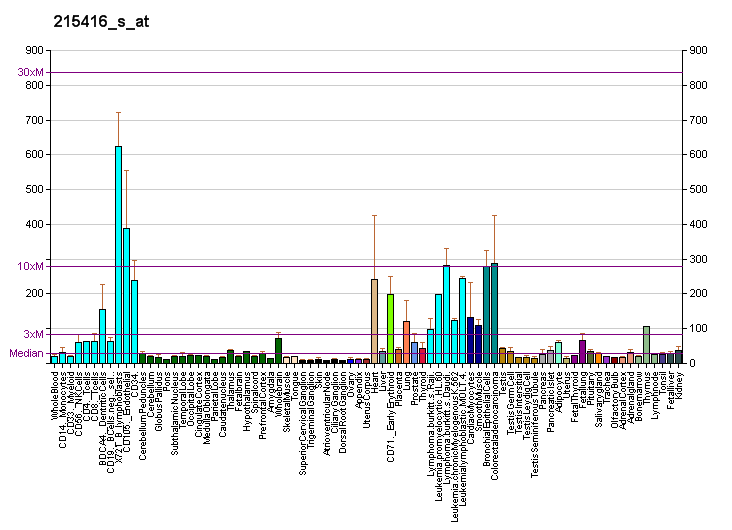
RNA expression pattern
Bgee	Human / Mouse (ortholog); Top expressed in: apex of heart; mucosa of transverse colon; right adrenal gland; right adrenal cortex; gastrocnemius muscle; left adrenal gland; left adrenal cortex; left ventricle; body of stomach; rectum / Top expressed in: epiblast; ventricular zone; neural tube; embryo; adrenal gland; embryo; proximal tubule; limb; quadriceps femoris muscle; tail of embryo; More reference expression data
BioGPS	More reference expression data
Gene ontology
Molecular function	cardiolipin binding; protein binding; GTPase binding; signaling receptor binding; lipid binding
Cellular component	cytoplasm; membrane; mitochondrial intermembrane space; plasma membrane; T cell receptor complex; mitochondrion; immunological synapse; actin cytoskeleton; membrane raft; COP9 signalosome; extrinsic component of plasma membrane; cytoskeleton; mitochondrial inner membrane
Biological process	CD4-positive, alpha-beta T cell activation; mitochondrial ATP synthesis coupled proton transport; mitochondrion organization; cellular calcium ion homeostasis; positive regulation of mitochondrial DNA replication; mitochondrial protein processing; lipid localization; protein complex oligomerization; stress-induced mitochondrial fusion; positive regulation of cardiolipin metabolic process; positive regulation of mitochondrial membrane potential; T cell receptor signaling pathway; interleukin-2 production; mitochondrial calcium ion transmembrane transport
Sources:Amigo / QuickGO
Orthologs
Species	Human	Mouse
Entrez	30968	66592
Ensembl	ENSG00000165283	ENSMUSG00000028455
UniProt	Q9UJZ1	Q99JB2
RefSeq (mRNA)	NM_013442; NM_001287031; NM_001287032; NM_001287033	NM_023231
RefSeq (protein)	NP_001273960; NP_001273961; NP_001273962; NP_038470	NP_075720
Location (UCSC)	Chr 9: 35.1 – 35.1 Mb	Chr 4: 43.03 – 43.03 Mb
PubMed search
- Wikidata
View/Edit Human	View/Edit Mouse

Stomatin-like protein 2 is a protein that in humans is encoded by the STOML2 gene.
