= RABGAP1 =

Protein-coding gene in the species Homo sapiens

Identifiers
- Aliases: RABGAP1, GAPCENA, TBC1D11, RAB GTPase activating protein 1
- External IDs: OMIM: 615882; MGI: 2385139; GeneCards: RABGAP1
Available structures
| PDB | Ortholog search: PDBe RCSB |
| PDB | List of PDB id codes 4NC6 |

Gene location (Human)
| Chr. | Chromosome 9 (human) |
| Band | 9q33.2-q33.3 | Start | 122,940,833 bp |
| Band | 9q33.2-q33.3 | End | 123,104,866 bp |

Gene location (Mouse)
| Chr. | Chromosome 2 (mouse) |
| Band | 2|2 B | Start | 37,333,291 bp |
| Band | 2|2 B | End | 37,456,466 bp |
RNA expression pattern
| Bgee | Human / Mouse (ortholog); Top expressed in: secondary oocyte; middle temporal gyrus; olfactory bulb; internal globus pallidus; optic nerve; amniotic fluid; endothelial cell; tail of epididymis; Brodmann area 23; saphenous vein / Top expressed in: genital tubercle; tail of embryo; pineal gland; zygote; superior cervical ganglion; arcuate nucleus; paraventricular nucleus of hypothalamus; median eminence; dorsomedial hypothalamic nucleus; medullary collecting duct; More reference expression data |
| BioGPS | n/a |
Gene ontology
| Molecular function | tubulin binding; protein binding; GTPase activator activity |
| Cellular component | cytoplasm; cytosol; centrosome; cytoskeleton; microtubule associated complex; microtubule organizing center; endomembrane system |
| Biological process | regulation of cilium assembly; cell cycle; positive regulation of GTPase activity; activation of GTPase activity; regulation of vesicle fusion; intracellular protein transport; regulation of GTPase activity |
Sources:Amigo / QuickGO
Orthologs
| Databases | NCBI: entry; OMA: entry |
| Species | Human | Mouse |
| Entrez | 23637 | 227800 |
| Ensembl | ENSG00000011454 | ENSMUSG00000035437 |
| UniProt | Q9Y3P9 | A2AWA9 |
| RefSeq (mRNA) | NM_012197 | NM_001033960; NM_146121; NM_001362956; NM_001362957; NM_001362958 |
| RefSeq (protein) | NP_036329 | NP_001029132; NP_666233; NP_001349885; NP_001349886; NP_001349887 |
| Location (UCSC) | Chr 9: 122.94 – 123.1 Mb | Chr 2: 37.33 – 37.46 Mb |
| PubMed search |
- Wikidata
| View/Edit Human | View/Edit Mouse |

RAB GTPase activating protein 1 is a protein in humans that is encoded by the RABGAP1 gene.
