= SNORD24 =

Small nucleolar RNA in humans

Identifiers
- Aliases: SNORD24, RNU24, U24, small nucleolar RNA, C/D box 24
- External IDs: GeneCards: SNORD24

Gene location (Human)
Chr.	Chromosome 9 (human)
Band	9q34.2	Start	133,349,396 bp
Band	9q34.2	End	133,349,470 bp
RNA expression pattern
Bgee	Human / Mouse (ortholog); Top expressed in: sural nerve; liver; Achilles tendon; myometrium; lung; heart; Brodmann area 9; islet of Langerhans; stomach; left ventricle / n/a; More reference expression data
BioGPS	n/a
Orthologs
Databases	NCBI: entry; OMA: entry
Species	Human	Mouse
Entrez	26820	n/a
Ensembl	ENSG00000206611; ENSG00000280889	n/a
UniProt	n a	n/a
RefSeq (mRNA)	n/a	n/a
RefSeq (protein)	n/a	n/a
Location (UCSC)	Chr 9: 133.35 – 133.35 Mb	n/a
PubMed search		n/a
- Wikidata
View/Edit Human

Small nucleolar RNA, C/D box 24 is a protein that in humans is encoded by the SNORD24 gene, on chromosome 9.
