= Zinc finger protein 510 =

Protein found in humans

ZNF510

Identifiers
- Aliases: ZNF510, zinc finger protein 510
- External IDs: GeneCards: ZNF510

Gene location (Human)
Chr.	Chromosome 9 (human)
Band	9q22.33	Start	96,754,553 bp
Band	9q22.33	End	96,778,129 bp
RNA expression pattern
Bgee	Human / Mouse (ortholog); Top expressed in: ganglionic eminence; testicle; Achilles tendon; gonad; ventricular zone; islet of Langerhans; epithelium of colon; cerebellar hemisphere; prefrontal cortex; tibialis anterior muscle / n/a; More reference expression data
BioGPS	n/a
Gene ontology
Molecular function	DNA binding; metal ion binding; nucleic acid binding; DNA-binding transcription factor activity, RNA polymerase II-specific
Cellular component	intracellular anatomical structure; nucleus
Biological process	regulation of transcription, DNA-templated; transcription, DNA-templated; regulation of transcription by RNA polymerase II
Sources:Amigo / QuickGO
Orthologs
Databases	NCBI: entry; OMA: entry
Species	Human	Mouse
Entrez	22869	n/a
Ensembl	ENSG00000081386	n/a
UniProt	Q9Y2H8	n/a
RefSeq (mRNA)	NM_001314059; NM_001314060; NM_014930	n/a
RefSeq (protein)	NP_001300988; NP_001300989; NP_055745	n/a
Location (UCSC)	Chr 9: 96.75 – 96.78 Mb	n/a
PubMed search		n/a
- Wikidata
View/Edit Human

Zinc finger protein 510 is a protein that in humans is encoded by the ZNF510 gene.

== Function ==
This gene encodes a krueppel C2H2-type zinc-finger protein family member. The encoded protein is expressed in several cancer cell types and may be a biomarker for early diagnosis of these cancers.
