= UBAC1 =

Protein-coding gene in the species Homo sapiens

Available structures
PDB	Ortholog search: PDBe RCSB
PDB	List of PDB id codes 2DAI

Identifiers
- Aliases: UBAC1, GBDR1, UBADC1, UBA domain containing 1, KPC2
- External IDs: OMIM: 608129; MGI: 1920995; HomoloGene: 9409; GeneCards: UBAC1; OMA:UBAC1 - orthologs

Gene location (Human)
Chr.	Chromosome 9 (human)
Band	9q34.3	Start	135,932,969 bp
Band	9q34.3	End	135,961,373 bp

Gene location (Mouse)
Chr.	Chromosome 2 (mouse)
Band	2|2 A3	Start	25,888,555 bp
Band	2|2 A3	End	25,911,759 bp
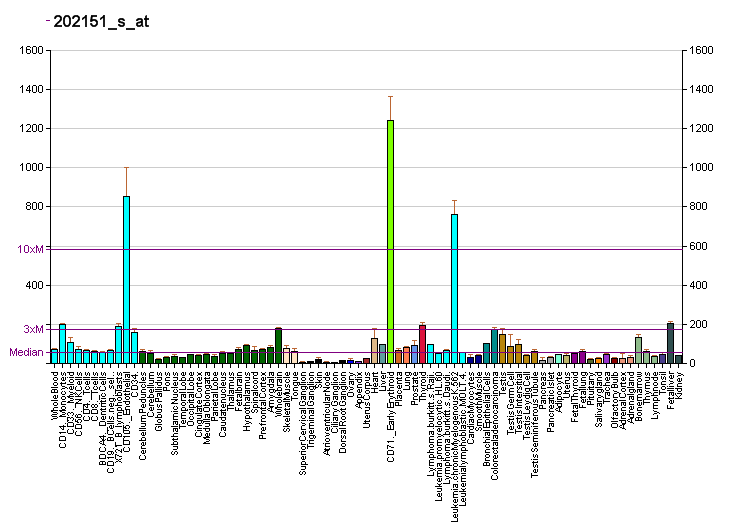
RNA expression pattern
Bgee	Human / Mouse (ortholog); Top expressed in: gastrocnemius muscle; muscle of thigh; Skeletal muscle tissue of biceps brachii; apex of heart; triceps brachii muscle; vastus lateralis muscle; muscle of trunk; Skeletal muscle tissue of rectus abdominis; glutes; thoracic diaphragm / Top expressed in: fetal liver hematopoietic progenitor cell; knee joint; temporal muscle; sternocleidomastoid muscle; triceps brachii muscle; digastric muscle; tibiofemoral joint; medial head of gastrocnemius muscle; vastus lateralis muscle; tibialis anterior muscle; More reference expression data
BioGPS	More reference expression data
Gene ontology
Molecular function	protein binding
Cellular component	plasma membrane; Golgi apparatus; extracellular exosome; cytoplasm; cytosol
Biological process	protein ubiquitination
Sources:Amigo / QuickGO
Orthologs
Species	Human	Mouse
Entrez	10422	98766
Ensembl	ENSG00000130560	ENSMUSG00000036352
UniProt	Q9BSL1	Q8VDI7
RefSeq (mRNA)	NM_016172	NM_133835; NM_001362681
RefSeq (protein)	NP_057256	NP_598596; NP_001349610
Location (UCSC)	Chr 9: 135.93 – 135.96 Mb	Chr 2: 25.89 – 25.91 Mb
PubMed search
- Wikidata
View/Edit Human	View/Edit Mouse

Ubiquitin-associated domain-containing protein 1 is a protein that in humans is encoded by the UBAC1 gene.
