= NAA35 =

Protein-coding gene in the species Homo sapiens

Identifiers
- Aliases: NAA35, EGAP, MAK10, MAK10P, bA379P1.1, N(alpha)-acetyltransferase 35, NatC auxiliary subunit, N-alpha-acetyltransferase 35, NatC auxiliary subunit
- External IDs: MGI: 1925939; HomoloGene: 5781; GeneCards: NAA35; OMA:NAA35 - orthologs

Gene location (Human)
Chr.	Chromosome 9 (human)
Band	9q21.33	Start	85,941,146 bp
Band	9q21.33	End	86,025,462 bp

Gene location (Mouse)
Chr.	Chromosome 13 (mouse)
Band	13|13 B2	Start	59,733,073 bp
Band	13|13 B2	End	59,783,736 bp
RNA expression pattern
Bgee	Human / Mouse (ortholog); Top expressed in: secondary oocyte; nipple; mucosa of sigmoid colon; bronchial epithelial cell; Achilles tendon; pons; corpus callosum; superior vestibular nucleus; Skeletal muscle tissue of rectus abdominis; inferior ganglion of vagus nerve / Top expressed in: spermatocyte; Rostral migratory stream; zygote; morula; genital tubercle; ventricular zone; secondary oocyte; neural tube; ganglionic eminence; spermatid; More reference expression data
BioGPS	n/a
Gene ontology
Molecular function	protein binding; peptide alpha-N-acetyltransferase activity
Cellular component	cytoplasm; NatC complex; polysome
Biological process	smooth muscle cell proliferation; negative regulation of apoptotic process; N-terminal protein amino acid acetylation; N-terminal peptidyl-methionine acetylation
Sources:Amigo / QuickGO
Orthologs
Species	Human	Mouse
Entrez	60560	78689
Ensembl	ENSG00000135040	ENSMUSG00000021555
UniProt	Q5VZE5	Q6PHQ8
RefSeq (mRNA)	NM_024635; NM_001321881; NM_001321882; NM_021929	NM_030153; NM_001384120; NM_001384121
RefSeq (protein)	NP_001308810; NP_001308811; NP_078911	NP_084429; NP_001371049; NP_001371050
Location (UCSC)	Chr 9: 85.94 – 86.03 Mb	Chr 13: 59.73 – 59.78 Mb
PubMed search
- Wikidata
View/Edit Human	View/Edit Mouse

N(alpha)-acetyltransferase 35, NatC auxiliary subunit is a protein in humans that is encoded by the NAA35 gene.
