= Olfactomedin 1 =

Protein-coding gene in the species Homo sapiens

OLFM1
Available structures
PDB	Ortholog search: PDBe RCSB
PDB	List of PDB id codes 4XAT

Identifiers
- Aliases: OLFM1, AMY, NOE1, NOELIN1, OlfA, olfactomedin 1
- External IDs: OMIM: 605366; MGI: 1860437; HomoloGene: 8612; GeneCards: OLFM1; OMA:OLFM1 - orthologs

Gene location (Human)
Chr.	Chromosome 9 (human)
Band	9q34.3	Start	135,075,422 bp
Band	9q34.3	End	135,121,180 bp

Gene location (Mouse)
Chr.	Chromosome 2 (mouse)
Band	2|2 A3	Start	28,083,004 bp
Band	2|2 A3	End	28,120,748 bp
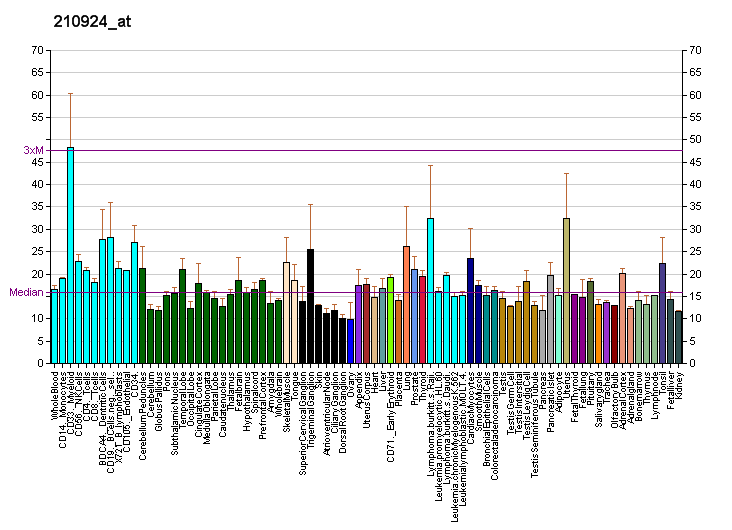

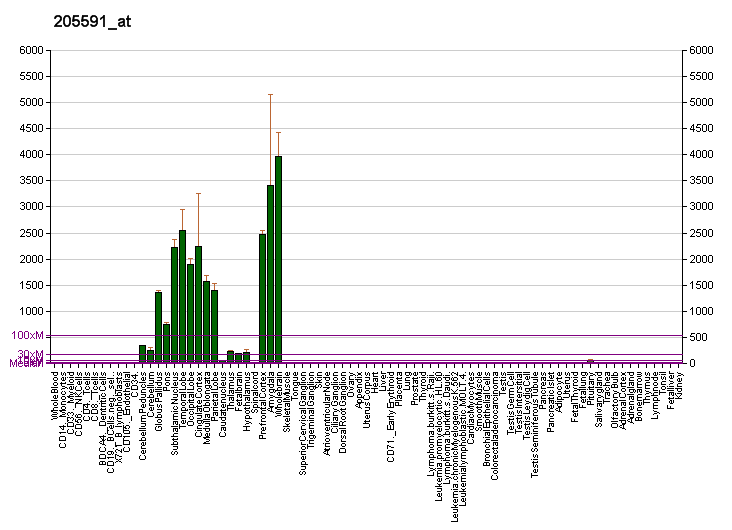

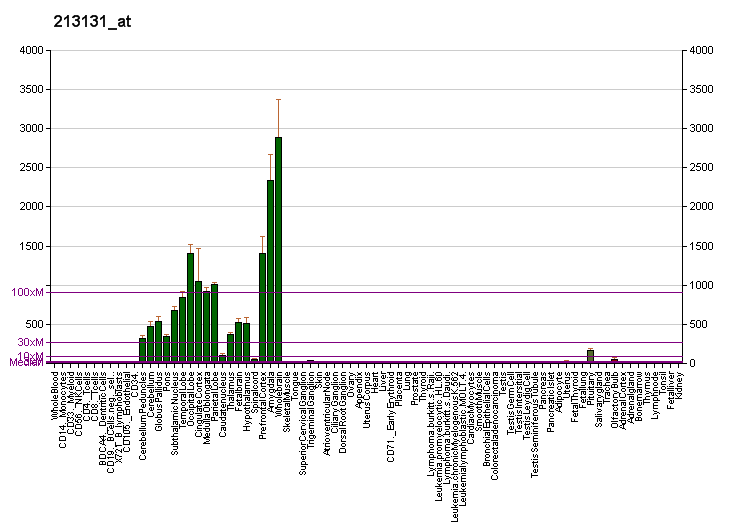
RNA expression pattern
Bgee	Human / Mouse (ortholog); Top expressed in: middle temporal gyrus; Brodmann area 10; frontal pole; primary visual cortex; superior frontal gyrus; right frontal lobe; dorsolateral prefrontal cortex; orbitofrontal cortex; Brodmann area 46; Brodmann area 23 / Top expressed in: dentate gyrus of hippocampal formation granule cell; superior frontal gyrus; primary visual cortex; hippocampus proper; primary motor cortex; prefrontal cortex; piriform cortex; anterior amygdaloid area; subiculum; cerebellar cortex; More reference expression data
BioGPS	More reference expression data
Gene ontology
Molecular function	protein binding
Cellular component	extracellular region; cell junction; axon; soma; perikaryon; axonal growth cone; synapse; cell projection; endoplasmic reticulum; extracellular space
Biological process	multicellular organism development; atrioventricular valve formation; neuronal signal transduction; positive regulation of gene expression; regulation of axon extension; positive regulation of epithelial to mesenchymal transition; negative regulation of gene expression; nervous system development; cardiac epithelial to mesenchymal transition; positive regulation of apoptotic process
Sources:Amigo / QuickGO
Orthologs
Species	Human	Mouse
Entrez	10439	56177
Ensembl	ENSG00000130558	ENSMUSG00000026833
UniProt	Q99784	O88998
RefSeq (mRNA)	NM_058199; NM_001282611; NM_001282612; NM_006334; NM_014279	NM_001038612; NM_001038613; NM_001038614; NM_019498
RefSeq (protein)	NP_001269540; NP_001269541; NP_006325; NP_055094	NP_001033701; NP_001033702; NP_001033703; NP_062371
Location (UCSC)	Chr 9: 135.08 – 135.12 Mb	Chr 2: 28.08 – 28.12 Mb
PubMed search
- Wikidata
View/Edit Human	View/Edit Mouse

Olfactomedin 1, also known as noelin 1 or pancortin, is a protein that in humans is encoded by the OLFM1 gene. The name noelin stands for "neuronal olfactomedin-related endoplasmic reticulum-localized 1".

This gene product shares extensive sequence similarity with the rat neuronal olfactomedin-related ER localized protein. While the exact function of the encoded protein is not known, its abundant expression in brain suggests that it may have an essential role in nerve tissue. Several alternatively spliced transcripts encoding different isoforms have been found for this gene.

== Cancer ==
OLFM1 gene has been detected progressively overexpressed in Human papillomavirus-positive neoplastic keratinocytes derived from uterine cervical preneoplastic lesions at different levels of malignancy. For this reason, this gene is likely to be associated with tumorigenesis and may be a potential prognostic marker for uterine cervical preneoplastic lesions progression.
