= Zinc finger and BTB domain-containing protein 43 =

Protein-coding gene in the species Homo sapiens

ZBTB43

Identifiers
- Aliases: ZBTB43, ZBTB22B, ZNF-X, ZNF297B, zinc finger and BTB domain containing 43
- External IDs: MGI: 1919084; GeneCards: ZBTB43
Available structures
PDB	Ortholog search: PDBe RCSB
PDB	List of PDB id codes 2CSH

Gene location (Human)
Chr.	Chromosome 9 (human)
Band	9q33.3	Start	126,805,006 bp
Band	9q33.3	End	126,838,210 bp

Gene location (Mouse)
Chr.	Chromosome 2 (mouse)
Band	2|2 B	Start	33,340,299 bp
Band	2|2 B	End	33,358,571 bp
RNA expression pattern
Bgee	Human / Mouse (ortholog); Top expressed in: buccal mucosa cell; nipple; testicle; secondary oocyte; body of tongue; mucosa of pharynx; internal globus pallidus; Skeletal muscle tissue of biceps brachii; gastrocnemius muscle; superior surface of tongue / Top expressed in: otolith organ; utricle; cumulus cell; hand; medullary collecting duct; Gonadal ridge; condyle; Paneth cell; renal corpuscle; substantia nigra; More reference expression data
BioGPS	n/a
Gene ontology
Molecular function	DNA binding; protein binding; metal ion binding; nucleic acid binding; DNA-binding transcription factor activity, RNA polymerase II-specific
Cellular component	nucleus
Biological process	regulation of transcription, DNA-templated; transcription, DNA-templated; regulation of transcription by RNA polymerase II
Sources:Amigo / QuickGO
Orthologs
Databases	NCBI: entry; OMA: entry
Species	Human	Mouse
Entrez	23099	71834
Ensembl	ENSG00000169155	ENSMUSG00000026788
UniProt	O43298; Q5JU97	Q9DAI4
RefSeq (mRNA)	NM_001135776; NM_014007	NM_001025594; NM_027947; NM_001355610; NM_001355611; NM_001355612
RefSeq (protein)	NP_001129248; NP_054726	NP_001020765; NP_082223; NP_001342539; NP_001342540; NP_001342541
Location (UCSC)	Chr 9: 126.81 – 126.84 Mb	Chr 2: 33.34 – 33.36 Mb
PubMed search
- Wikidata
View/Edit Human	View/Edit Mouse

Zinc finger and BTB domain containing 43 is a protein that in humans is encoded by the ZBTB43 gene.
