= Acytosiosis =

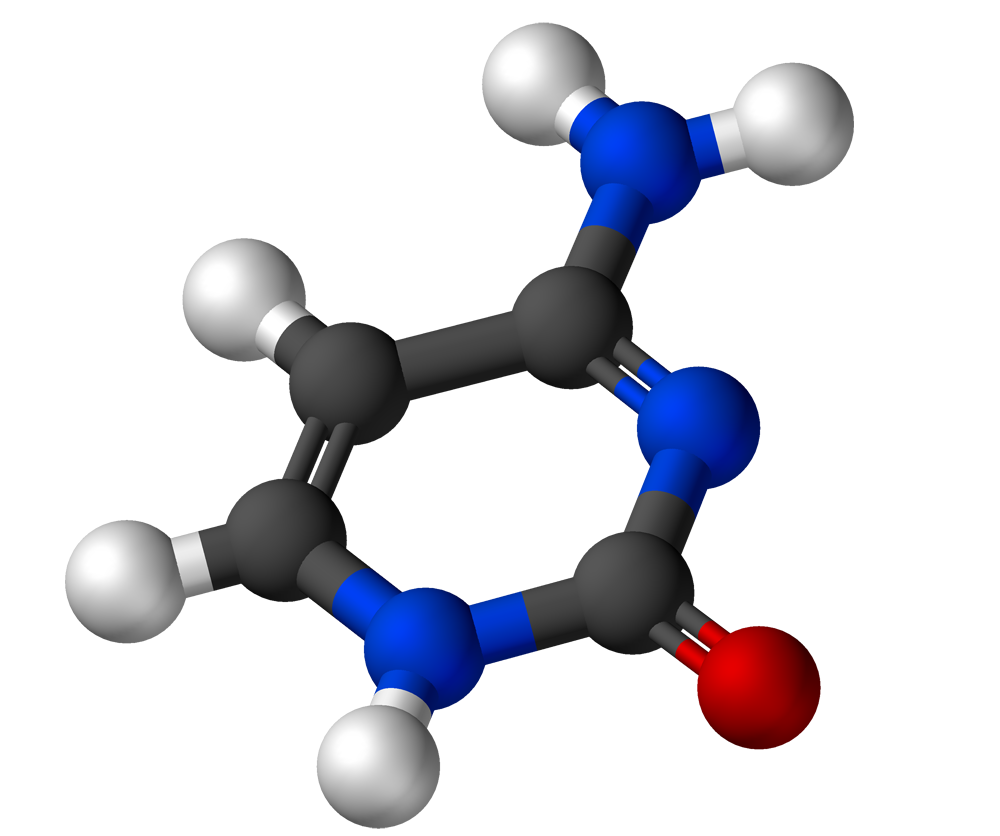
- This condition is due to an absence of cytosine

Acytosiosis is a rare genetic disorder.

== Symptoms and signs ==
Because of the complete lack of cytosine due to the defective Alpha-cytosinase, DNA replication cannot occur. This means that any zygote with Acytosiosis will be unable to divide into multiple cells and will thus die. In most cases, the mother won't even know that she would have had a baby if it hadn't died from Acytosiosis.

== Causes ==
Acytosiosis is caused by an autosomal recessive mutation on Chromosome 9, which causes a defect in the enzyme Alpha-cytosinase.

== Etymology ==
The name "Acytosiosis" comes from a combination of the prefix "a-", meaning "no" or "none", "cytosine", and the suffix "-iosis", meaning "disorder".
