= ST6GALNAC6 =

Protein-coding gene in the species Homo sapiens

Identifiers
- Aliases: ST6GALNAC6, SIAT7-F, SIAT7F, ST6GALNACVI, ST6 N-acetylgalactosaminide alpha-2,6-sialyltransferase 6
- External IDs: OMIM: 610135; MGI: 1355316; GeneCards: ST6GALNAC6

Gene location (Human)
Chr.	Chromosome 9 (human)
Band	9q34.11	Start	127,885,321 bp
Band	9q34.11	End	127,905,408 bp

Gene location (Mouse)
Chr.	Chromosome 2 (mouse)
Band	2|2 B	Start	32,489,721 bp
Band	2|2 B	End	32,510,818 bp
RNA expression pattern
Bgee	Human / Mouse (ortholog); Top expressed in: amygdala; nucleus accumbens; putamen; caudate nucleus; anterior cingulate cortex; right frontal lobe; hippocampus proper; rectum; right coronary artery; dorsolateral prefrontal cortex / Top expressed in: left colon; superior frontal gyrus; neural layer of retina; dentate gyrus of hippocampal formation granule cell; primary visual cortex; cerebellar cortex; muscle of thigh; right ventricle; olfactory tubercle; ciliary body; More reference expression data
BioGPS	n/a
Gene ontology
Molecular function	transferase activity; glycosyltransferase activity; sialyltransferase activity; alpha-N-acetylgalactosaminide alpha-2,6-sialyltransferase activity
Cellular component	integral component of membrane; Golgi apparatus; membrane; plasma membrane; Golgi membrane; cytoplasm
Biological process	cell-cell recognition; glycoprotein metabolic process; glycosphingolipid metabolic process; protein glycosylation; glycosylceramide metabolic process; oligosaccharide metabolic process; sialylation; protein N-linked glycosylation via asparagine; ganglioside biosynthetic process; oligosaccharide biosynthetic process
Sources:Amigo / QuickGO
Orthologs
Databases	NCBI: entry; OMA: entry
Species	Human	Mouse
Entrez	30815	50935
Ensembl	ENSG00000160408	ENSMUSG00000026811
UniProt	Q969X2	Q9JM95
RefSeq (mRNA)	NM_001286999; NM_001287000; NM_001287001; NM_001287002; NM_001287003 NM_013443; NM_001388489	NM_001025310; NM_001025311; NM_001289547; NM_001289548; NM_001289549 NM_016973
RefSeq (protein)	NP_001273928; NP_001273929; NP_001273930; NP_001273931; NP_001273932 NP_038471	NP_001020481; NP_001020482; NP_001276476; NP_001276477; NP_001276478 NP_058669
Location (UCSC)	Chr 9: 127.89 – 127.91 Mb	Chr 2: 32.49 – 32.51 Mb
PubMed search
- Wikidata
View/Edit Human	View/Edit Mouse

Alpha-N-acetylgalactosaminide alpha-2,6-sialyltransferase 6 is an enzyme that in humans is encoded by the ST6GALNAC6 gene.
