= LINGO2 =

Protein-coding gene in the species Homo sapiens

Identifiers
- Aliases: LINGO2, LERN3, LRRN6C, leucine rich repeat and Ig domain containing 2
- External IDs: OMIM: 609793; MGI: 2442298; GeneCards: LINGO2

Gene location (Human)
Chr.	Chromosome 9 (human)
Band	9p21.2-p21.1	Start	27,948,078 bp
Band	9p21.2-p21.1	End	28,670,286 bp

Gene location (Mouse)
Chr.	Chromosome 4 (mouse)
Band	4|4 A5	Start	35,706,647 bp
Band	4|4 A5	End	36,951,747 bp
RNA expression pattern
Bgee	Human / Mouse (ortholog); Top expressed in: secondary oocyte; endothelial cell; middle temporal gyrus; Brodmann area 23; testicle; buccal mucosa cell; primary visual cortex; tail of epididymis; myometrium; body of uterus / Top expressed in: zygote; secondary oocyte; piriform cortex; respiratory epithelium; olfactory epithelium; dentate gyrus of hippocampal formation granule cell; primary visual cortex; superior frontal gyrus; ventromedial nucleus; primary motor cortex; More reference expression data
BioGPS	n/a
Orthologs
Databases	NCBI: entry; OMA: entry
Species	Human	Mouse
Entrez	158038	242384
Ensembl	ENSG00000174482	ENSMUSG00000045083
UniProt	Q7L985	Q3URE9
RefSeq (mRNA)	NM_001258282; NM_152570; NM_001354574; NM_001354575	NM_001165999; NM_001166000; NM_001166001; NM_175516
RefSeq (protein)	NP_001245211; NP_689783; NP_001341503; NP_001341504	NP_001159471; NP_001159472; NP_001159473; NP_780725
Location (UCSC)	Chr 9: 27.95 – 28.67 Mb	Chr 4: 35.71 – 36.95 Mb
PubMed search
- Wikidata
View/Edit Human	View/Edit Mouse

Leucine rich repeat and Ig domain containing 2 is a protein that in humans is encoded by the LINGO2 gene.
