= Mitoguardin 2 =

Protein-coding gene in the species Homo sapiens

MIGA2

Identifiers
- Aliases: MIGA2, C9orf54, FAM73B, family with sequence similarity 73 member B, mitoguardin 2
- External IDs: OMIM: 616774; MGI: 1922035; HomoloGene: 13125; GeneCards: MIGA2; OMA:MIGA2 - orthologs

Gene location (Human)
Chr.	Chromosome 9 (human)
Band	9q34.11	Start	129,036,621 bp
Band	9q34.11	End	129,072,082 bp

Gene location (Mouse)
Chr.	Chromosome 2 (mouse)
Band	2|2 B	Start	30,364,233 bp
Band	2|2 B	End	30,385,521 bp
RNA expression pattern
Bgee	Human / Mouse (ortholog); Top expressed in: pancreatic ductal cell; apex of heart; right hemisphere of cerebellum; mucosa of transverse colon; granulocyte; skin of arm; right lobe of thyroid gland; body of stomach; cerebellar vermis; left ventricle / Top expressed in: brown adipose tissue; substantia nigra; motor neuron; right ventricle; left lobe of liver; medial vestibular nucleus; medial geniculate nucleus; deep cerebellar nuclei; medial dorsal nucleus; tunica adventitia of aorta; More reference expression data
BioGPS	n/a
Gene ontology
Molecular function	protein binding; protein homodimerization activity; protein heterodimerization activity
Cellular component	integral component of membrane; mitochondrial outer membrane; membrane; mitochondrion; integral component of plasma membrane
Biological process	mitochondrial fusion; bone development
Sources:Amigo / QuickGO
Orthologs
Species	Human	Mouse
Entrez	84895	108958
Ensembl	ENSG00000148343	ENSMUSG00000026858
UniProt	Q7L4E1	Q8BK03
RefSeq (mRNA)	NM_032809; NM_001329990	NM_001242407; NM_175392
RefSeq (protein)	NP_001316919; NP_116198	NP_001229336; NP_780601; NP_001365835; NP_001365836; NP_001365838 NP_001365840; NP_001394213
Location (UCSC)	Chr 9: 129.04 – 129.07 Mb	Chr 2: 30.36 – 30.39 Mb
PubMed search
- Wikidata
View/Edit Human	View/Edit Mouse

Mitoguardin 2, also known as FAM73B, is a protein which in humans is encoded by the MIGA2 gene.
