= STRBP =

Protein-coding gene in Homo sapiens

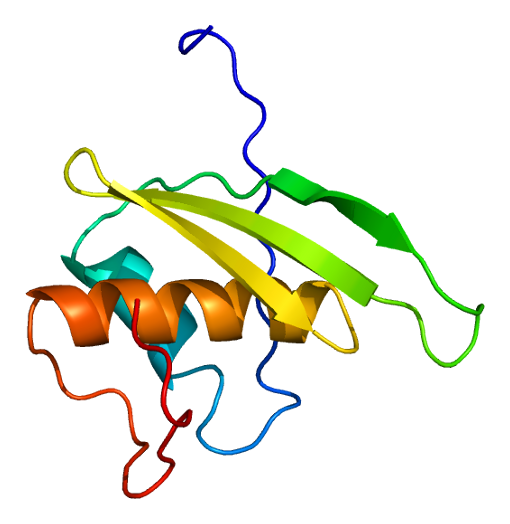
Available structures
PDB	Ortholog search: PDBe RCSB
PDB	List of PDB id codes 2DMY

Identifiers
- Aliases: STRBP, HEL162, ILF3L, SPNR, p74, spermatid perinuclear RNA binding protein
- External IDs: OMIM: 611138; MGI: 104626; HomoloGene: 7548; GeneCards: STRBP; OMA:STRBP - orthologs

Gene location (Human)
Chr.	Chromosome 9 (human)
Band	9q33.3	Start	123,109,500 bp
Band	9q33.3	End	123,268,586 bp

Gene location (Mouse)
Chr.	Chromosome 2 (mouse)
Band	2|2 B	Start	37,373,240 bp
Band	2|2 B	End	37,593,871 bp
RNA expression pattern
Bgee	Human / Mouse (ortholog); Top expressed in: secondary oocyte; primary visual cortex; lateral nuclear group of thalamus; Brodmann area 23; sperm; ganglionic eminence; endothelial cell; parietal lobe; postcentral gyrus; epithelium of nasopharynx / Top expressed in: tail of embryo; lacrimal gland; genital tubercle; zygote; medial dorsal nucleus; olfactory epithelium; Rostral migratory stream; medial geniculate nucleus; spermatocyte; secondary oocyte; More reference expression data
BioGPS	n/a
Gene ontology
Molecular function	DNA binding; double-stranded RNA binding; protein binding; single-stranded RNA binding; RNA binding; microtubule binding; tubulin binding
Cellular component	cytoplasm; microtubule cytoskeleton; nucleus; manchette
Biological process	multicellular organism development; mechanosensory behavior; cell differentiation; spermatogenesis; spermatid development
Sources:Amigo / QuickGO
Orthologs
Species	Human	Mouse
Entrez	55342	20744
Ensembl	ENSG00000165209	ENSMUSG00000026915
UniProt	Q96SI9	Q91WM1
RefSeq (mRNA)	NM_001171137; NM_018387; NM_001376106; NM_001376107; NM_001376109	NM_009261; NM_176932; NM_001355259; NM_001379314; NM_001379315 NM_001379316
RefSeq (protein)	NP_001164608; NP_060857; NP_001363035; NP_001363036; NP_001363038	NP_033287; NP_001342188; NP_001366243; NP_001366244; NP_001366245
Location (UCSC)	Chr 9: 123.11 – 123.27 Mb	Chr 2: 37.37 – 37.59 Mb
PubMed search
- Wikidata
View/Edit Human	View/Edit Mouse

Spermatid perinuclear RNA-binding protein is a protein that in humans is encoded by the STRBP gene.
