= GCNT1 =

Protein-coding gene in the species Homo sapiens

Identifiers
- Aliases: GCNT1, C2GNT, C2GNT-L, C2GNT1, G6NT, NACGT2, NAGCT2, glucosaminyl (N-acetyl) transferase 1, core 2, glucosaminyl (N-acetyl) transferase 1
- External IDs: OMIM: 600391; MGI: 95676; GeneCards: GCNT1
Available structures
PDB	Ortholog search: PDBe RCSB
PDB	List of PDB id codes 2GAK, 2GAM, 3OTK
Enzyme activity
EC #	BRENDA	ExPASy	KEGG	MetaCyc
2.4.1.102	↗	↗	↗	↗

Gene location (Human)
Chr.	Chromosome 9 (human)
Band	9q21.13	Start	76,419,850 bp
Band	9q21.13	End	76,651,203 bp

Gene location (Mouse)
Chr.	Chromosome 19 (mouse)
Band	19 B|19 12.75 cM	Start	17,303,505 bp
Band	19 B|19 12.75 cM	End	17,350,208 bp
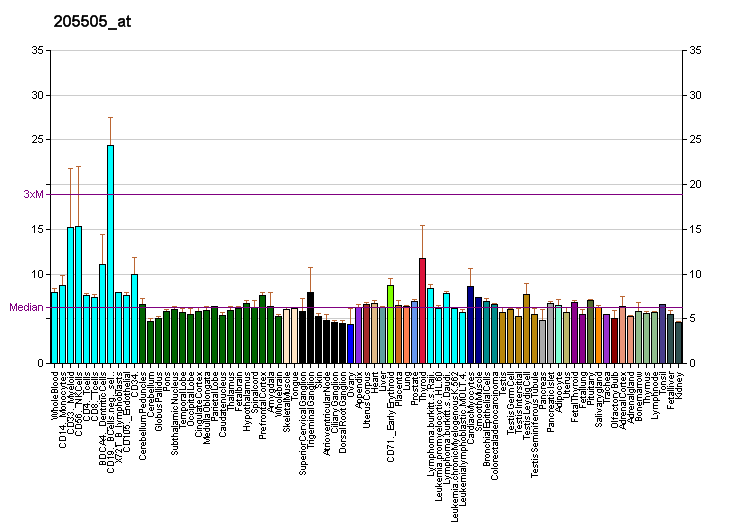
RNA expression pattern
Bgee	Human / Mouse (ortholog); Top expressed in: duodenum; jejunal mucosa; islet of Langerhans; amniotic fluid; Achilles tendon; mucosa of sigmoid colon; secondary oocyte; rectum; mucosa of ileum; monocyte / Top expressed in: right kidney; parotid gland; proximal tubule; granulocyte; human kidney; stroma of bone marrow; atrioventricular valve; left colon; mesenteric lymph nodes; aortic valve; More reference expression data
BioGPS	More reference expression data
Gene ontology
Molecular function	transferase activity; acetylglucosaminyltransferase activity; glycosyltransferase activity; beta-1,3-galactosyl-O-glycosyl-glycoprotein beta-1,6-N-acetylglucosaminyltransferase activity; protein binding
Cellular component	integral component of membrane; Golgi apparatus; membrane; Golgi cisterna; trans-Golgi network; Golgi membrane; extracellular space
Biological process	glycoprotein biosynthetic process; tissue morphogenesis; response to insulin; protein glycosylation; kidney morphogenesis; O-glycan processing; leukocyte tethering or rolling; cell adhesion molecule production
Sources:Amigo / QuickGO
Orthologs
Databases	NCBI: entry; OMA: entry
Species	Human	Mouse
Entrez	2650	14537
Ensembl	ENSG00000187210	ENSMUSG00000038843
UniProt	Q02742	Q09324
RefSeq (mRNA)	NM_001097633; NM_001097634; NM_001097635; NM_001097636; NM_001490	NM_001136484; NM_010265; NM_173442
RefSeq (protein)	NP_001091102; NP_001091103; NP_001091104; NP_001091105; NP_001481	NP_001129956; NP_034395; NP_775618
Location (UCSC)	Chr 9: 76.42 – 76.65 Mb	Chr 19: 17.3 – 17.35 Mb
PubMed search
- Wikidata
View/Edit Human	View/Edit Mouse

Beta-1,3-galactosyl-O-glycosyl-glycoprotein beta-1,6-N-acetylglucosaminyltransferase is an enzyme that in humans is encoded by the GCNT1 gene.

This gene is a member of the beta-1,6-N-acetylglucosaminyltransferase gene family. It is essential to the formation of Gal beta 1-3(GlcNAc beta 1–6)GalNAc structures and the core 2 O-glycan branch. The gene coding this enzyme was originally mapped to 9q21, but was later localized to 9q13. Multiple alternatively spliced variants, encoding the same protein, have been identified.
