= REXO4 =

Protein-coding gene in the species Homo sapiens

Identifiers
- Aliases: REXO4, REX4, XPMC2, XPMC2H, REX4 homolog, 3'-5' exonuclease
- External IDs: OMIM: 602930; MGI: 2684957; GeneCards: REXO4

Gene location (Human)
Chr.	Chromosome 9 (human)
Band	9q34.2	Start	133,406,059 bp
Band	9q34.2	End	133,418,096 bp

Gene location (Mouse)
Chr.	Chromosome 2 (mouse)
Band	2|2 A3	Start	26,843,575 bp
Band	2|2 A3	End	26,854,398 bp
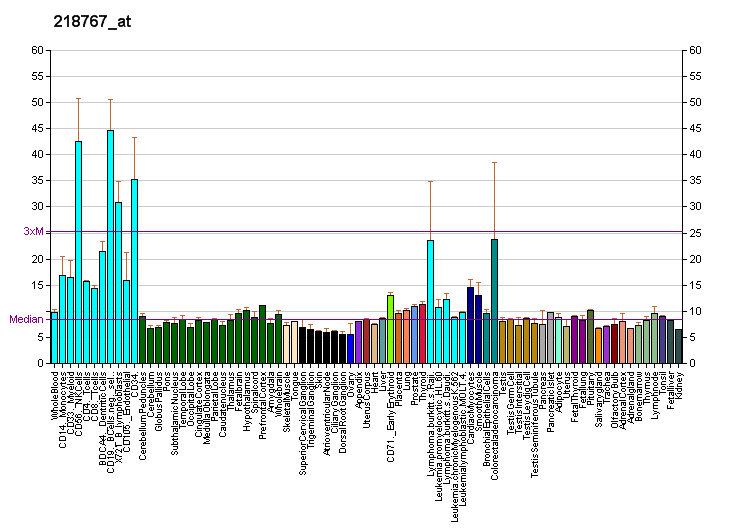
RNA expression pattern
Bgee	Human / Mouse (ortholog); Top expressed in: sural nerve; skeletal muscle tissue; gastrocnemius muscle; muscle of thigh; mucosa of transverse colon; ventricular zone; granulocyte; ganglionic eminence; apex of heart; body of pancreas / Top expressed in: Paneth cell; fossa; condyle; internal carotid artery; external carotid artery; thymus; neural layer of retina; motor neuron; medullary collecting duct; facial motor nucleus; More reference expression data
BioGPS	More reference expression data
Gene ontology
Molecular function	DNA-binding transcription factor activity; nuclease activity; exonuclease activity; hydrolase activity; nucleic acid binding; RNA binding; single-stranded DNA binding; transcription coactivator activity; endonuclease activity; 3'-5' exonuclease activity
Cellular component	nucleolus; nucleus; nuclear speck
Biological process	regulation of transcription, DNA-templated; nucleic acid phosphodiester bond hydrolysis; DNA catabolic process, endonucleolytic; DNA catabolic process, exonucleolytic; rRNA processing; positive regulation of transcription by RNA polymerase II
Sources:Amigo / QuickGO
Orthologs
Databases	NCBI: entry; OMA: entry
Species	Human	Mouse
Entrez	57109	227656
Ensembl	ENSG00000280706; ENSG00000148300	ENSMUSG00000052406
UniProt	Q9GZR2	Q6PAQ4
RefSeq (mRNA)	NM_001279349; NM_001279350; NM_001279351; NM_020385	NM_207234; NM_001362876
RefSeq (protein)	NP_001266278; NP_001266279; NP_001266280; NP_065118	NP_997117; NP_001349805
Location (UCSC)	Chr 9: 133.41 – 133.42 Mb	Chr 2: 26.84 – 26.85 Mb
PubMed search
- Wikidata
View/Edit Human	View/Edit Mouse

RNA exonuclease 4 is an enzyme that in humans is encoded by the REXO4 gene.
