= CNTLN =

Protein-coding gene in the species Homo sapiens

Identifiers
- Aliases: CNTLN, C9orf101, C9orf39, bA340N12.1, centlein
- External IDs: OMIM: 611870; MGI: 2443104; HomoloGene: 9805; GeneCards: CNTLN; OMA:CNTLN - orthologs

Gene location (Human)
Chr.	Chromosome 9 (human)
Band	9p22.2	Start	17,134,982 bp
Band	9p22.2	End	17,503,923 bp

Gene location (Mouse)
Chr.	Chromosome 4 (mouse)
Band	4|4 C4	Start	84,802,546 bp
Band	4|4 C4	End	85,050,158 bp
RNA expression pattern
Bgee	Human / Mouse (ortholog); Top expressed in: buccal mucosa cell; Achilles tendon; ventricular zone; gonad; sural nerve; ganglionic eminence; testicle; monocyte; secondary oocyte; right lobe of liver / Top expressed in: saccule; zygote; spermatocyte; otic vesicle; genital tubercle; secondary oocyte; ventricular zone; vas deferens; sciatic nerve; iris; More reference expression data
BioGPS	n/a
Gene ontology
Molecular function	protein-macromolecule adaptor activity; protein kinase binding; protein domain specific binding
Cellular component	cytoplasm; centriole; extracellular exosome; cytoskeleton; nucleoplasm; centrosome; cytosol
Biological process	protein localization to organelle; centriole-centriole cohesion
Sources:Amigo / QuickGO
Orthologs
Species	Human	Mouse
Entrez	54875	338349
Ensembl	ENSG00000044459	ENSMUSG00000038070
UniProt	Q9NXG0	A2AM05
RefSeq (mRNA)	NM_001114395; NM_001286984; NM_001286985; NM_017738; NM_001365029	NM_175275; NM_177385
RefSeq (protein)	NP_001107867; NP_001273913; NP_001273914; NP_060208; NP_001351958	NP_780484; NP_796359; NP_001392359; NP_001392360
Location (UCSC)	Chr 9: 17.13 – 17.5 Mb	Chr 4: 84.8 – 85.05 Mb
PubMed search
- Wikidata
View/Edit Human	View/Edit Mouse

Centlein, centrosomal protein is a protein in humans that is encoded by the CNTLN gene.
