= NOL6 =

Protein-coding gene in the species Homo sapiens

Identifiers
- Aliases: NOL6, NRAP, UTP22, bA311H10.1, nucleolar protein 6
- External IDs: OMIM: 611532; MGI: 2140151; GeneCards: NOL6

Gene location (Human)
Chr.	Chromosome 9 (human)
Band	9p13.3	Start	33,461,353 bp
Band	9p13.3	End	33,473,930 bp

Gene location (Mouse)
Chr.	Chromosome 4 (mouse)
Band	4|4 A5	Start	41,114,427 bp
Band	4|4 A5	End	41,124,455 bp
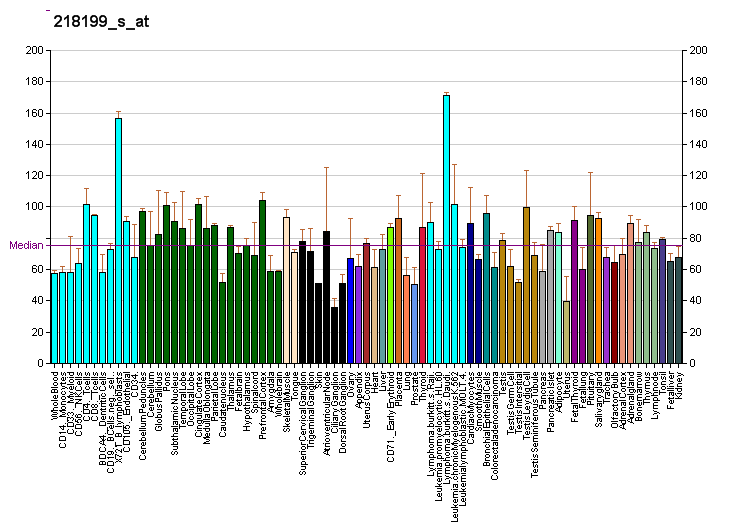
RNA expression pattern
Bgee	Human / Mouse (ortholog); Top expressed in: apex of heart; olfactory zone of nasal mucosa; nasal epithelium; gastrocnemius muscle; skin of leg; right testis; left testis; tendon of biceps brachii; skin of abdomen; anterior pituitary / Top expressed in: primary visual cortex; dentate gyrus of hippocampal formation granule cell; superior frontal gyrus; tibiofemoral joint; gastrula; epiblast; right ventricle; yolk sac; cerebellar cortex; tail of embryo; More reference expression data
BioGPS	More reference expression data
Gene ontology
Molecular function	protein binding; RNA binding
Cellular component	condensed nuclear chromosome; small-subunit processome; nucleolus; mitochondrion; nucleus; CURI complex; chromosome; UTP-C complex; nucleoplasm
Biological process	tRNA export from nucleus; rRNA processing
Sources:Amigo / QuickGO
Orthologs
Databases	NCBI: entry; OMA: entry
Species	Human	Mouse
Entrez	65083	230082
Ensembl	ENSG00000165271	ENSMUSG00000028430
UniProt	Q9H6R4	Q8R5K4
RefSeq (mRNA)	NM_139235; NM_022917; NM_130793	NM_139236; NM_139237
RefSeq (protein)	NP_075068; NP_631981	NP_631982
Location (UCSC)	Chr 9: 33.46 – 33.47 Mb	Chr 4: 41.11 – 41.12 Mb
PubMed search
- Wikidata
View/Edit Human	View/Edit Mouse

Nucleolar protein 6 is a protein that in humans is encoded by the NOL6 gene.

The nucleolus is a dense subnuclear membraneless organelle that assembles around clusters of rRNA genes and functions in ribosome biogenesis. This gene encodes a nucleolar RNA-associated protein that is highly conserved between species. RNase treatment of permeabilized cells indicates that the nucleolar localization is RNA dependent. Further studies suggest that the protein is associated with ribosome biogenesis through an interaction with pre-rRNA primary transcripts. Alternative splicing has been observed at this locus and two splice variants encoding distinct isoforms have been identified.
