= BANCR =

Non-coding RNA in the species Homo sapiens

Identifiers
- Aliases: BANCR, LINC00586, BRAF-activated non-protein coding RNA
- External IDs: GeneCards: BANCR

Gene location (Human)
Chr.	Chromosome 9 (human)
Band	9q21.11-q21.12	Start	69,296,678 bp
Band	9q21.11-q21.12	End	69,311,111 bp
RNA expression pattern
Bgee	Human / Mouse (ortholog); Top expressed in: testicle; buccal mucosa cell; myocardium of left ventricle; smooth muscle tissue; right ventricle; retinal pigment epithelium; apex of heart; islet of Langerhans; right auricle of heart; right lung / n/a; More reference expression data
BioGPS	n/a
Orthologs
Databases	NCBI: entry; OMA: entry
Species	Human	Mouse
Entrez	100885775	n/a
Ensembl	ENSG00000278910	n/a
UniProt	n a	n/a
RefSeq (mRNA)	n/a	n/a
RefSeq (protein)	n/a	n/a
Location (UCSC)	Chr 9: 69.3 – 69.31 Mb	n/a
PubMed search		n/a
- Wikidata
View/Edit Human

BRAF-activated non-protein coding RNA is a noncoding RNA that in humans is encoded by the BANCR gene. Long non-coding RNAs (lncRNAs) are involved in the intricate network of cancer and contribute significantly to tumorigenesis and progression. BRAF activated non-coding RNA (BANCR), a 693-bp four-exon transcript, was first identified in 2012 as an oncogenic long non-coding RNA in BRAFV600E melanomas cells and was found to be associated with melanoma cell migration. Apart from melanoma, growing evidence has implicated BANCR in the development and progression of a variety of other human malignancies, including retinoblastoma, lung cancer, and gastric cancer, since its discovery. The pattern of expression of BANCR varies according to the kind of cancer, acting as either a tumour suppressor or an accelerator. Functional BANCR may be a useful biomarker for cancer diagnosis and prognosis assessment. BANCR-targeted therapy may also prove to be a promising new treatment option for human cancers.
