= DENND1A =

Protein-coding gene in the species Homo sapiens

Identifiers
- Aliases: DENND1A, FAM31A, KIAA1608, DENN domain containing 1A
- External IDs: OMIM: 613633; MGI: 2442794; GeneCards: DENND1A

Gene location (Human)
Chr.	Chromosome 9 (human)
Band	9q33.3	Start	123,379,654 bp
Band	9q33.3	End	123,930,152 bp

Gene location (Mouse)
Chr.	Chromosome 2 (mouse)
Band	2|2 B	Start	37,689,003 bp
Band	2|2 B	End	38,177,402 bp
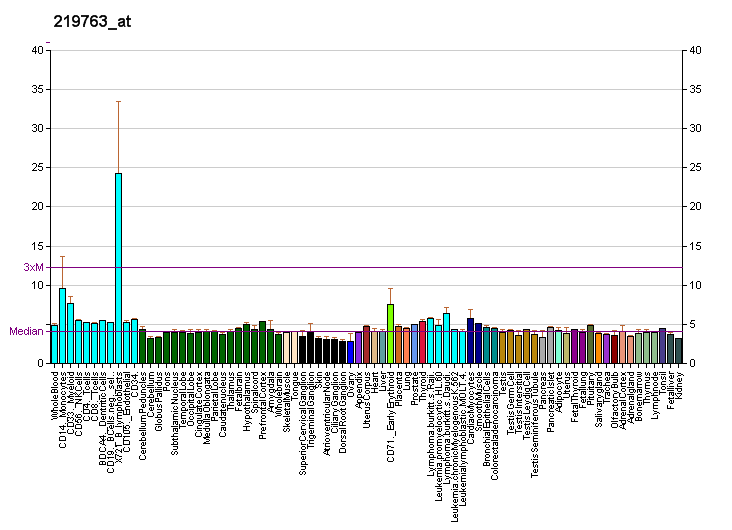
RNA expression pattern
Bgee	Human / Mouse (ortholog); Top expressed in: monocyte; bone marrow cell; ventricular zone; mucosa of ileum; granulocyte; right frontal lobe; cingulate gyrus; anterior cingulate cortex; prefrontal cortex; blood / Top expressed in: neural layer of retina; zygote; primary visual cortex; dentate gyrus of hippocampal formation granule cell; superior frontal gyrus; secondary oocyte; muscle of thigh; right kidney; spermatocyte; spermatid; More reference expression data
BioGPS	More reference expression data
Gene ontology
Molecular function	guanyl-nucleotide exchange factor activity; SH3 domain binding; lipid binding; phosphatidylinositol phosphate binding; phosphatidylinositol-3-phosphate binding
Cellular component	membrane; plasma membrane; synapse; cell junction; soma; dendrite; clathrin-coated vesicle membrane; presynaptic membrane; cytoplasmic vesicle; clathrin-coated vesicle; nucleoplasm; cytosol; intracellular membrane-bounded organelle
Biological process	endocytosis; regulation of Rab protein signal transduction; synaptic vesicle endocytosis; protein transport; positive regulation of GTPase activity; endocytic recycling
Sources:Amigo / QuickGO
Orthologs
Databases	NCBI: entry; OMA: entry
Species	Human	Mouse
Entrez	57706	227801
Ensembl	ENSG00000119522	ENSMUSG00000035392
UniProt	Q8TEH3	Q8K382
RefSeq (mRNA)	NM_020946; NM_024820; NM_001352964; NM_001352965; NM_001352966 NM_001352967; NM_001352968; NM_001393654; NM_001400446; NM_001400449	NM_146122; NM_001362973; NM_001362977; NM_001362978
RefSeq (protein)	NP_065997; NP_079096; NP_001339893; NP_001339894; NP_001339895 NP_001339896; NP_001339897	NP_666234; NP_001349902; NP_001349906; NP_001349907
Location (UCSC)	Chr 9: 123.38 – 123.93 Mb	Chr 2: 37.69 – 38.18 Mb
PubMed search
- Wikidata
View/Edit Human	View/Edit Mouse

DENN domain-containing protein 1A is a protein that in humans is encoded by the DENND1A gene.
