= TMEM215 =

Protein-coding gene in the species Homo sapiens

Identifiers
- Aliases: TMEM215, transmembrane protein 215
- External IDs: MGI: 2444167; HomoloGene: 27946; GeneCards: TMEM215; OMA:TMEM215 - orthologs

Gene location (Human)
| Chr. | Chromosome 9 (human) |
| Band | 9p21.1 | Start | 32,783,540 bp |
| Band | 9p21.1 | End | 32,789,201 bp |

Gene location (Mouse)
| Chr. | Chromosome 4 (mouse) |
| Band | 4|4 A5 | Start | 40,472,180 bp |
| Band | 4|4 A5 | End | 40,477,168 bp |
RNA expression pattern
| Bgee | Human / Mouse (ortholog); Top expressed in: testicle; tibial nerve; sural nerve; left testis; endometrium; right testis; primary visual cortex; prefrontal cortex; superior frontal gyrus; muscle of thigh / Top expressed in: islet of Langerhans; neural layer of retina; lumbar subsegment of spinal cord; pineal gland; embryo; embryo; primary visual cortex; superior frontal gyrus; anterior amygdaloid area; dentate gyrus of hippocampal formation granule cell; More reference expression data |
| BioGPS | n/a |
Orthologs
| Species | Human | Mouse |
| Entrez | 401498 | 320500 |
| Ensembl | ENSG00000188133 | ENSMUSG00000046593 |
| UniProt | Q68D42 | A7E1Z1 |
| RefSeq (mRNA) | NM_212558 | NM_001166009; NM_177175 |
| RefSeq (protein) | NP_997723 | NP_001159481; NP_796149 |
| Location (UCSC) | Chr 9: 32.78 – 32.79 Mb | Chr 4: 40.47 – 40.48 Mb |
| PubMed search |
- Wikidata
| View/Edit Human | View/Edit Mouse |

Transmembrane protein 215 is a protein that in humans is encoded by the TMEM215 gene.
