= OBP2B =

Protein-coding gene in the species Homo sapiens

Identifiers
- Aliases: OBP2B, LCN14, OBPIIb, odorant binding protein 2B
- External IDs: OMIM: 604606; MGI: 2387617; GeneCards: OBP2B

Gene location (Human)
Chr.	Chromosome 9 (human)
Band	9q34.2	Start	133,205,277 bp
Band	9q34.2	End	133,209,250 bp

Gene location (Mouse)
Chr.	Chromosome 2 (mouse)
Band	2|2 A3	Start	25,590,055 bp
Band	2|2 A3	End	25,593,338 bp
RNA expression pattern
Bgee	Human / Mouse (ortholog); Top expressed in: right testis; left testis; right uterine tube; skin of abdomen; skin of leg; lactiferous gland; apex of heart; spleen; left ventricle; placenta / Top expressed in: olfactory epithelium; extraocular muscle; left lobe of liver; blastocyst; temporal muscle; digastric muscle; stomach; uterus; thymus; sexually immature organism; More reference expression data
BioGPS	n/a
Gene ontology
Molecular function	odorant binding; small molecule binding
Cellular component	extracellular region; cellular component
Biological process	chemosensory behavior; response to stimulus; sensory perception of smell
Sources:Amigo / QuickGO
Orthologs
Databases	NCBI: entry; OMA: entry
Species	Human	Mouse
Entrez	29989	227627
Ensembl	ENSG00000280584; ENSG00000171102	ENSMUSG00000062061
UniProt	Q9NPH6	Q8K1H9
RefSeq (mRNA)	NM_001288987; NM_014581	NM_153558
RefSeq (protein)	NP_001275916; NP_055396	NP_705786
Location (UCSC)	Chr 9: 133.21 – 133.21 Mb	Chr 2: 25.59 – 25.59 Mb
PubMed search
- Wikidata
View/Edit Human	View/Edit Mouse

Odorant-binding protein 2B is a protein that in humans is encoded by the OBP2B gene.
