= EQTN =

Protein-coding gene in the species Homo sapiens

Identifiers
- Aliases: EQTN, AFAF, C9orf11, SPACA8, equatorin
- External IDs: OMIM: 617653; MGI: 1915003; HomoloGene: 75250; GeneCards: EQTN; OMA:EQTN - orthologs

Gene location (Mouse)
Chr.	Chromosome 4 (mouse)
Band	4|4 C5	Start	94,795,504 bp
Band	4|4 C5	End	94,817,080 bp
RNA expression pattern
Bgee	Human / Mouse (ortholog); Top expressed in: sperm; corpus callosum; gastric mucosa; right lung; rectum; left uterine tube; tibial nerve; body of stomach; left coronary artery; substantia nigra / Top expressed in: spermatid; seminiferous tubule; spermatocyte; lumbar subsegment of spinal cord; embryo; embryo; muscle of thigh; superior frontal gyrus; primary visual cortex; upper arm; More reference expression data
BioGPS	n/a
Orthologs
Species	Human	Mouse
Entrez	54586	67753
Ensembl	n/a	ENSMUSG00000028575
UniProt	Q9NQ60	Q9D9V2
RefSeq (mRNA)	NM_001161585; NM_020641	NM_001290623; NM_027089
RefSeq (protein)	NP_001155057; NP_065692	NP_001277552; NP_081365
Location (UCSC)	n/a	Chr 4: 94.8 – 94.82 Mb
PubMed search
- Wikidata
View/Edit Human	View/Edit Mouse

Equatorin, sperm acrosome associated is a protein that in humans is encoded by the EQTN gene.
