= Palmitoyltransferase ZDHHC21 =

Protein-coding gene in the species Homo sapiens

ZDHHC21

Identifiers
- Aliases: ZDHHC21, 9130404H11Rik, DHHC-21, DHHC21, DNZ1, HSPC097, zinc finger DHHC-type containing 21
- External IDs: OMIM: 614605; MGI: 1915518; GeneCards: ZDHHC21
Enzyme activity
EC #	BRENDA	ExPASy	KEGG	MetaCyc
2.3.1.225	↗	↗	↗	↗

Gene location (Mouse)
Chr.	Chromosome 4 (mouse)
Band	4 39.4 cM|4 C3	Start	82,798,738 bp
Band	4 39.4 cM|4 C3	End	82,859,958 bp
Gene ontology
Molecular function	acyltransferase activity; protein-cysteine S-palmitoyltransferase activity; transferase activity; palmitoyltransferase activity
Cellular component	membrane; Golgi membrane; integral component of membrane; plasma membrane; Golgi apparatus; endoplasmic reticulum
Biological process	regulation of nitric-oxide synthase activity; peptidyl-L-cysteine S-palmitoylation; hair follicle development; sebaceous gland development; protein palmitoylation; protein targeting to membrane
Sources:Amigo / QuickGO
Orthologs
Databases	NCBI: entry; OMA: entry
Species	Human	Mouse
Entrez	340481	68268
Ensembl	ENSG00000175893	ENSMUSG00000028403
UniProt	Q8IVQ6	Q9D270
RefSeq (mRNA)	NM_178566	NM_026647
RefSeq (protein)	NP_848661; NP_001341047; NP_001341048; NP_001341049; NP_001341050 NP_001341051; NP_001341052; NP_001341053; NP_001341054; NP_001341055; NP_001341056; NP_001341057; NP_001341058; NP_001341059	NP_080923
Location (UCSC)	n/a	Chr 4: 82.8 – 82.86 Mb
PubMed search
- Wikidata
View/Edit Human	View/Edit Mouse

Palmitoyltransferase ZDHHC21 is a protein that in humans is encoded by the ZDHHC21 gene.
