= IFN1@ =

Gene in the species Homo sapiens

Identifiers
- Aliases: IFNAinterferontype 1cluster
- External IDs: GeneCards: ; OMA:- orthologs
Orthologs
Species	Human	Mouse
Entrez	3438	n/a
Ensembl	n/a	n/a
UniProt	n a	n/a
RefSeq (mRNA)	n/a	n/a
RefSeq (protein)	n/a	n/a
Location (UCSC)	n/a	n/a
PubMed search		n/a
- Wikidata
View/Edit Human

Interferon, type 1, cluster, also known as IFN1@, is a human gene.
