= HAUS6 =

Protein-coding gene in the species Homo sapiens

Identifiers
- Aliases: HAUS6, Dgt6, FAM29A, HAUS augmin like complex subunit 6
- External IDs: OMIM: 613433; MGI: 1923389; GeneCards: HAUS6

Gene location (Mouse)
Chr.	Chromosome 4 (mouse)
Band	4 C4|4 40.69 cM	Start	86,497,092 bp
Band	4 C4|4 40.69 cM	End	86,530,292 bp
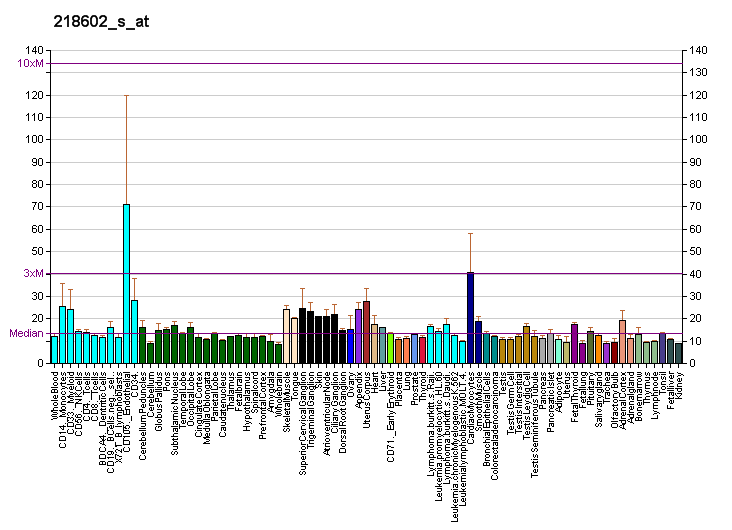
RNA expression pattern
Bgee	Human / Mouse (ortholog); Top expressed in: ganglionic eminence; pancreatic epithelial cell; endothelial cell; germinal epithelium; parietal pleura; visceral pleura; Achilles tendon; Brodmann area 23; internal globus pallidus; tibia / Top expressed in: tail of embryo; epiblast; mandibular prominence; abdominal wall; yolk sac; cumulus cell; maxillary prominence; primitive streak; endothelial cell of lymphatic vessel; zygote; More reference expression data
BioGPS	More reference expression data
Gene ontology
Molecular function	protein binding; molecular function
Cellular component	centrosome; spindle; microtubule; HAUS complex; cytoskeleton; microtubule organizing center; cytoplasm; cytosol; nuclear speck
Biological process	spindle assembly; cell division; cell cycle; G2/M transition of mitotic cell cycle; ciliary basal body-plasma membrane docking; centrosome cycle; regulation of G2/M transition of mitotic cell cycle
Sources:Amigo / QuickGO
Orthologs
Databases	NCBI: entry
Species	Human	Mouse
Entrez	54801	230376
Ensembl	n/a	ENSMUSG00000038047
UniProt	Q7Z4H7	n/a
RefSeq (mRNA)	NM_001270890; NM_017645	NM_173400
RefSeq (protein)	NP_001257819; NP_060115	n/a
Location (UCSC)	n/a	Chr 4: 86.5 – 86.53 Mb
PubMed search
- Wikidata
View/Edit Human	View/Edit Mouse

HAUS augmin like complex subunit 6, also known as HAUS6, is a human gene.
