= SLC25A25-AS1 =

Non-coding RNA in humans

Identifiers
- Aliases: SLC25A25-AS1, SLC25A25 antisense RNA 1, HRCEG
- External IDs: GeneCards: SLC25A25-AS1
Orthologs
Databases	NCBI: entry; OMA: entry
Species	Human	Mouse
Entrez	100289019	n/a
Ensembl	ENSG00000234771	n/a
UniProt	n a	n/a
RefSeq (mRNA)	n/a	n/a
RefSeq (protein)	n/a	n/a
Location (UCSC)	n/a	n/a
PubMed search		n/a
- Wikidata
View/Edit Human

SLC25A25 antisense RNA 1 is a non-coding RNA that in humans is encoded by the SLC25A25-AS1 gene.
