= Chromosome 10 =

Human chromosome

- Human chromosome 10 pair after G-banding. One is from mother, one is from father.

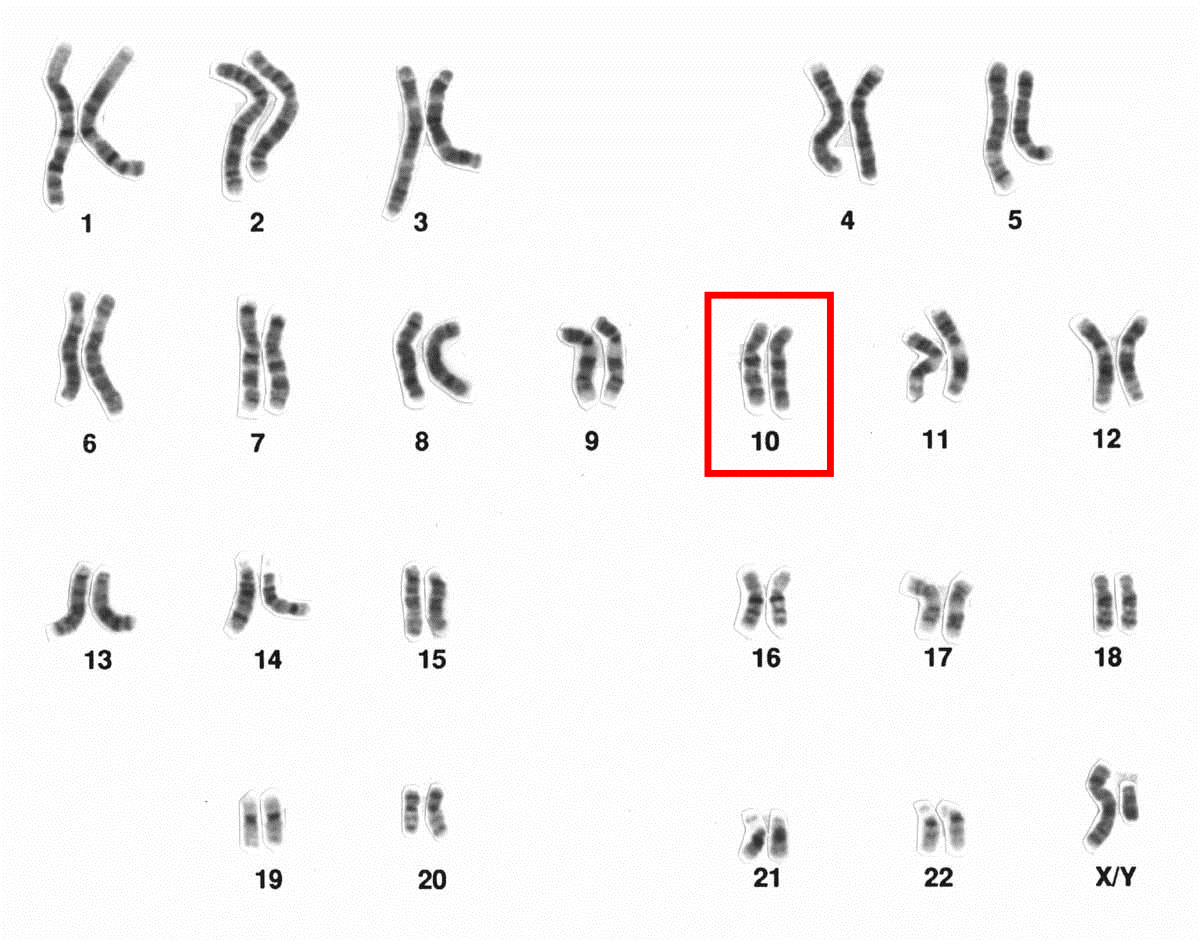
- Chromosome 10 pair in human male karyogram.

Features
- Length (bp): 134,758,134 bp (CHM13)
- No. of genes: 706 (CCDS)
- Type: Autosome
- Centromere position: Submetacentric (39.8 Mbp)

Complete gene lists
- CCDS: Gene list
- HGNC: Gene list
- UniProt: Gene list
- NCBI: Gene list

External map viewers
- Ensembl: Chromosome 10
- Entrez: Chromosome 10
- NCBI: Chromosome 10
- UCSC: Chromosome 10

Full DNA sequences
- RefSeq: NC_000010 (FASTA)
- GenBank: CM000672 (FASTA)

Chromosome 10 is one of the 23 pairs of chromosomes in humans. People normally have two copies of this chromosome. Chromosome 10 spans about 134 million base pairs (the building material of DNA) and represents between 4 and 4.5 percent of the total DNA in cells.

== Genes ==
=== Number of genes ===
The following are some of the gene count estimates of human chromosome 10. Because researchers use different approaches to genome annotation their predictions of the number of genes on each chromosome varies (for technical details, see gene prediction). Among various projects, the collaborative consensus coding sequence project (CCDS) takes an extremely conservative strategy. So CCDS's gene number prediction represents a lower bound on the total number of human protein-coding genes.

Estimated by	Protein-coding genes	Non-coding RNA genes	Pseudogenes	Source	Release date
CCDS	706	—	—		2016-09-08
HGNC	708	244	614		2017-05-12
Ensembl	728	881	568		2017-03-29
UniProt	750	—	—		2018-02-28
NCBI	754	842	654		2017-05-19

=== Gene list ===
The following is a partial list of genes on human chromosome 10. For complete list, see the link in the infobox on the right.

- AFAP1L2: actin filament associated protein 1 like 2
- ALL1 encoding protein Leukemia, acute lymphocytic, susceptibility to, 1
- ALOX5: Arachidonate 5-Lipoxygenase (processes essential fatty acids to leukotrienes, which are important agents in the inflammatory response; also facilitates development and maintenance of cancer stem cells, slow-dividing cells thought to give rise to a variety of cancers, including leukemia)
- ANKRD22: encoding protein Ankyrin repeat domain 22
- ARHGAP21: rho GTPase activating protein 21
- ARID5B: encoding protein AT-rich interactive domain-containing protein 5B
- ARMH3: Armadillo Like Helical Domain Containing 3
- AS3MT: encoding enzyme Arsenite methyltransferase
- AVPI1: encoding protein Arginine vasopressin-induced protein 1
- C10orf67: chromosome 10 open reading frame 67
- C10orf35: chromosome 10 open reading frame 35
- CAMK1D: calcium/calmodulin-dependent protein kinase ID
- CCAR1: Cell division cycle and apoptosis regulator 1
- CCDC3: Coiled-coil domain-containing protein 3
- CCDC186: encoding protein CCDC186
- CCNY: Cyclin-Y
- CDC123: Cell division cycle protein 123 homolog
- CDH23: cadherin-like 23
- CDH23-AS1: CDH23 antisense RNA 1
- CDNF: cerebral dopamine neurotrophic factor
- CEFIP: encoding protein Cardiac-enriched FHL2-interacting protein
- COMMD3-BMI1: COMMD3-BMI1 readthrough
- CPXM2: encoding protein Carboxypeptidase x, m14 family member 2
- CUTC: Copper homeostasis protein cutC homolog
- CXCL12: chemokine (C-X-C motif) ligand 12, SDF-1, scyb12
- DDX50: DExD-box helicase 50
- DEPP: decidual protein induced by progesterone
- DHX32: DEAH-box helicase 32
- DIP2C: encoding protein Disco interacting protein 2 homolog c
- DKK1: Dickkopf-related protein 1
- DNAJC12: DnaJ (Hsp40) homolog, subfamily c, member 12
- DNAJC9: DnaJ (Hsp40) homolog, subfamily c, member 9
- DPYSL4: Dihydropyrimidinase-related protein 4
- EBLN1: encoding protein Endogenous Bornavirus-like nucleoprotein 1
- ECD: ecdysoneless cell cycle regulator
- EGR2: early growth response 2 (Krox-20 homolog, Drosophila)
- EIF5AP1: eukaryotic translation initiation factor 5A-like 1
- EPC1: Enhancer of polycomb homolog 1
- ERCC6: excision repair cross-complementing rodent repair deficiency, complementation group 6
- FAM107B: family with sequence similarity 107, member B
- FAM13C: family with sequence similarity 13, member C
- FAM170B: encoding protein Family with sequence similarity 170 member B
- FAM188A: family with sequence similarity 188, member A
- FAM208b: encoding protein FAM208b
- FAM213A: family with sequence similarity 213, member A
- FAM25BP encoding protein Protein FAM25
- FAS-AS1, long non-coding RNA
- FBXL15: encoding protein F-box and leucine rich repeat protein 15
- FGFR2: fibroblast growth factor receptor 2 (bacteria-expressed kinase, keratinocyte growth factor receptor, craniofacial dysostosis 1, Crouzon syndrome, Pfeiffer syndrome, Jackson–Weiss syndrome)
- FRA10AC1: Fragile site, folic acid type
- FRAT1: WNT signaling pathway regulator
- FRAT2: WNT signaling pathway regulator
- FRMPD2 encoding protein FERM and PDZ domain containing 2
- GATA3: encoding the GATA3 transcription factor. GATA3 is critical for the embryonic development of the parathyroid gland, neural component of hearing, and kidney. Haploinsufficiency of the gene underlies a rare disorder, the hypoparathyrodism, deafness, and renal dysplasia syndrome
- GHITM: growth hormone-inducible transmembrane protein
- GPR15LG: encoding protein GPR15LG, GPR15 ligand
- GPRIN2: G protein-regulated inducer of neurite outgrowth 2
- GTPBP4: Nucleolar GTP-binding protein 4
- HELLS: Lymphoid-specific helicase
- HKDC1: hexokinase domain containing 1
- KIN: DNA/RNA-binding protein KIN17
- LHPP: encoding protein Phospholysine phosphohistidine inorganic pyrophosphate phosphatase
- MTG1: mitochondrial GTPase 1
- NPM3: nucleoplasmin-3
- NRBF2: nuclear receptor-binding factor 2
- NSMCE4A: non-SMC element 4 homolog A
- OTUD1: encoding protein OTU deubiquitinase 1
- PAPSS2: encoding enzyme bifunctional 3'-phosphoadenosine 5'-phosphosulfate synthase 2
- PCBD1: 6-pyruvoyl-tetrahydropterin synthase/dimerization cofactor of hepatocyte nuclear factor 1 alpha (TCF1)
- PCDH15: protocadherin 15
- PI4K2A: phosphatidylinositol 4-kinase 2-alpha
- PIP4K2A: phosphatidylinositol 5 phosphate 4-kinase type-2 alpha
- PITRM1: pitrilysin metallopeptidase 1
- PLEKHS1 encoding protein Pleckstrin homology domain containing S1
- PLXDC2: plexin domain-containing protein 2
- PRAP1: encoding protein Proline rich acidic protein 1
- PROSER2: proline and serine rich 2 or c10orf47
- PTEN gene: phosphatase and tensin homolog (mutated in multiple advanced cancers 1)
- RET: ret proto-oncogene (multiple endocrine neoplasia and medullary thyroid carcinoma 1, Hirschsprung disease)
- RPP30: ribonuclease P protein subunit p30
- RRP12: ribosomal RNA processing 12 homolog
- RSU1: ras suppressor protein 1
- RTKN2: encoding protein Rhotekin 2
- SCZD11: encoding protein Schizophrenia susceptibility locus, chromosome 10q-related
- SGPL1: sphingosine-1-phosphate lyase 1
- SHTN1: encoding protein Shootin 1
- SLC16A12: encoding protein Solute carrier family 16 member 12
- SMNDC1: survival motor neuron domain containing 1
- SPG9 encoding protein Spastic paraplegia 9 (autosomal dominant)
- SRGN: serglycin
- STAMBPL1: STAM binding protein like 1
- STOX1: encoding protein Storkhead box 1
- SUFU: suppressor of fused protein
- SUPV3L1: Suv3 like RNA helicase
- SYCE1: encoding protein Synaptonemal complex central element protein 1
- TACC2 encoding protein Transforming acidic coiled-coil-containing protein 2
- TBC1D12: TBC1 domain family, member 12
- TCTN3: tectonic family member 3
- TMEM10: opalin
- TMEM254: encoding protein Transmembrane protein 254
- TMEM26: encoding protein Transmembrane protein 26
- TMEM72: encoding protein Transmembrane protein 72
- TYSND1: encoding protein Trypsin domain containing 1
- UCN3: urocortin-3
- UROS: uroporphyrinogen III synthase (congenital erythropoietic porphyria)
- USMG5: Up-regulated during skeletal muscle growth protein 5
- USP54: encoding protein Ubiquitin specific peptidase 54
- USP6NL: USP6 N-terminal like protein
- UTF1: undifferentiated embryonic cell transcription factor 1
- VIM-AS1: VIM antisense RNA 1
- WASHC2C: WASH complex subunit 2C
- WBP1L: WW domain binding protein 1-like
- ZNF37A: zinc finger protein 37A
- ZNF438: zinc finger protein 438
- ZRANB1: Zinc finger ranbp2-type containing 1

== Diseases and disorders ==
The following diseases are related to genes on chromosome 10:

- Apert syndrome
- Barakat syndrome
- Beare–Stevenson cutis gyrata syndrome
- Charcot–Marie–Tooth disease
- Cockayne syndrome
- Congenital erythropoietic porphyria
- Cowden syndrome
- Crouzon syndrome
- Genitopatellar syndrome
- Glioblastoma multiforme
- Gorlin syndrome
- HADDS syndrome
- Hermansky–Pudlak syndrome
- Hirschprung disease
- Jackson–Weiss syndrome
- Multiple endocrine neoplasia type 2
- Nonsyndromic deafness
- Pfeiffer syndrome
- Porphyria
- Sphingosine phosphate lyase insufficiency syndrome
- Spondyloepimetaphyseal dysplasia, Pakistani type
- Tetrahydrobiopterin deficiency
- Thiel–Behnke corneal dystrophy
- Usher syndrome
- Wolman syndrome
- Young-Simpson syndrome
- Combined Saposin Deficiency

== Cytogenetic band ==
G-banding ideograms of human chromosome 10

G-banding ideogram of human chromosome 10 in resolution 850 bphs. Band length in this diagram is proportional to base-pair length. This type of ideogram is generally used in genome browsers (e.g. Ensembl, UCSC Genome Browser).

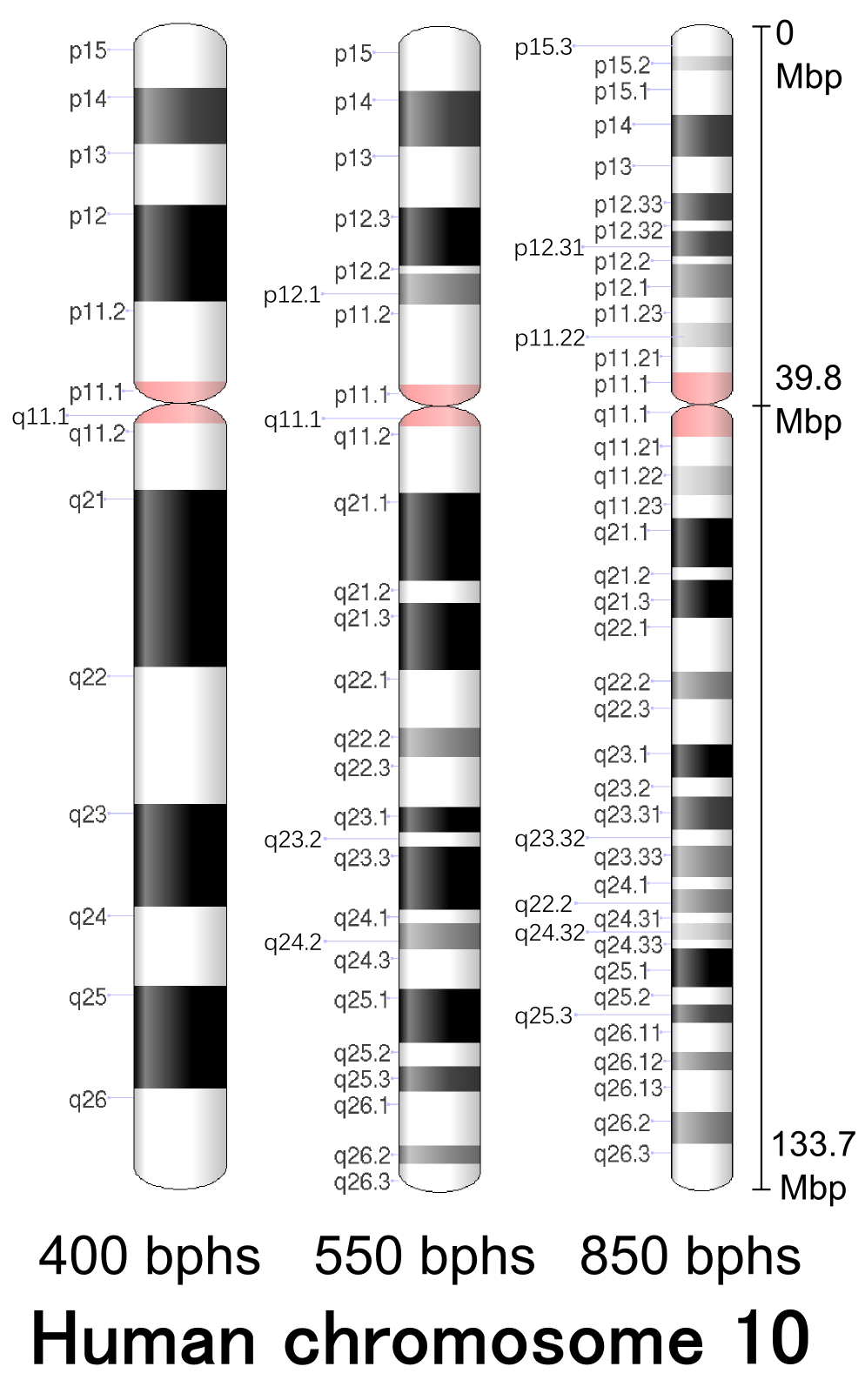
G-banding patterns of human chromosome 10 in three different resolutions (400, 550 and 850). Band length in this diagram is based on the ideograms from ISCN (2013). This type of ideogram represents actual relative band length observed under a microscope at the different moments during the mitotic process.

G-bands of human chromosome 10 in resolution 850 bphs
Chr.	Arm	Band	ISCN start	ISCN stop	Basepair start	Basepair stop	Stain	Density
10	p	15.3	0	229	1	3,000,000	gneg	
10	p	15.2	229	329	3,000,001	3,800,000	gpos	25
10	p	15.1	329	630	3,800,001	6,600,000	gneg	
10	p	14	630	917	6,600,001	12,200,000	gpos	75
10	p	13	917	1175	12,200,001	17,300,000	gneg	
10	p	12.33	1175	1361	17,300,001	18,300,000	gpos	75
10	p	12.32	1361	1432	18,300,001	18,400,000	gneg	
10	p	12.31	1432	1604	18,400,001	22,300,000	gpos	75
10	p	12.2	1604	1662	22,300,001	24,300,000	gneg	
10	p	12.1	1662	1891	24,300,001	29,300,000	gpos	50
10	p	11.23	1891	2063	29,300,001	31,100,000	gneg	
10	p	11.22	2063	2235	31,100,001	34,200,000	gpos	25
10	p	11.21	2235	2406	34,200,001	38,000,000	gneg	
10	p	11.1	2406	2621	38,000,001	39,800,000	acen	
10	q	11.1	2621	2850	39,800,001	41,600,000	acen	
10	q	11.21	2850	3051	41,600,001	45,500,000	gneg	
10	q	11.22	3051	3252	45,500,001	48,600,000	gpos	25
10	q	11.23	3252	3409	48,600,001	51,100,000	gneg	
10	q	21.1	3409	3753	51,100,001	59,400,000	gpos	100
10	q	21.2	3753	3839	59,400,001	62,800,000	gneg	
10	q	21.3	3839	4097	62,800,001	68,800,000	gpos	100
10	q	22.1	4097	4469	68,800,001	73,100,000	gneg	
10	q	22.2	4469	4655	73,100,001	75,900,000	gpos	50
10	q	22.3	4655	4970	75,900,001	80,300,000	gneg	
10	q	23.1	4970	5200	80,300,001	86,100,000	gpos	100
10	q	23.2	5200	5331	86,100,001	87,700,000	gneg	
10	q	23.31	5331	5558	87,700,001	91,100,000	gpos	75
10	q	23.32	5558	5672	91,100,001	92,300,000	gneg	
10	q	23.33	5672	5887	92,300,001	95,300,000	gpos	50
10	q	24.1	5887	5973	95,300,001	97,500,000	gneg	
10	q	24.2	5973	6131	97,500,001	100,100,000	gpos	50
10	q	24.31	6131	6202	100,100,001	101,200,000	gneg	
10	q	24.32	6202	6317	101,200,001	103,100,000	gpos	25
10	q	24.33	6317	6374	103,100,001	104,000,000	gneg	
10	q	25.1	6374	6646	104,000,001	110,100,000	gpos	100
10	q	25.2	6646	6761	110,100,001	113,100,000	gneg	
10	q	25.3	6761	6890	113,100,001	117,300,000	gpos	75
10	q	26.11	6890	7090	117,300,001	119,900,000	gneg	
10	q	26.12	7090	7219	119,900,001	121,400,000	gpos	50
10	q	26.13	7219	7506	121,400,001	125,700,000	gneg	
10	q	26.2	7506	7721	125,700,001	128,800,000	gpos	50
10	q	26.3	7721	8050	128,800,001	133,797,422	gneg	
