= PLXDC1 =

Protein-coding gene in the species Homo sapiens

Identifiers
- Aliases: PLXDC1, TEM3, TEM7, plexin domain containing 1
- External IDs: OMIM: 606826; MGI: 1919574; GeneCards: PLXDC1

Gene location (Human)
Chr.	Chromosome 17 (human)
Band	17q12	Start	39,063,313 bp
Band	17q12	End	39,154,394 bp

Gene location (Mouse)
Chr.	Chromosome 11 (mouse)
Band	11|11 D	Start	97,814,064 bp
Band	11|11 D	End	97,877,270 bp
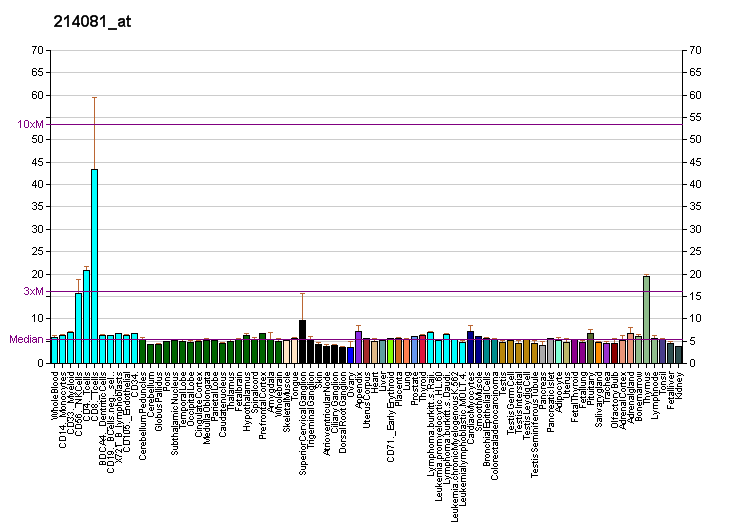

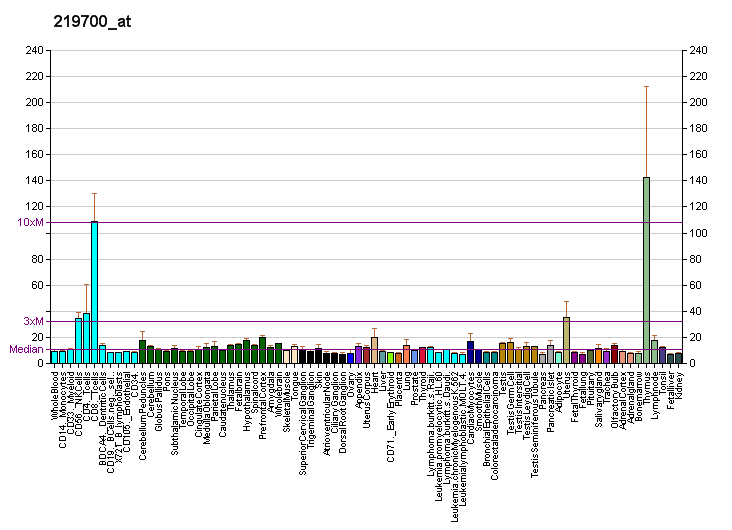
RNA expression pattern
Bgee	Human / Mouse (ortholog); Top expressed in: apex of heart; tendon of biceps brachii; right ovary; gallbladder; left uterine tube; left ovary; body of uterus; right uterine tube; tibial nerve; gastric mucosa / Top expressed in: motor neuron; facial motor nucleus; lateral geniculate nucleus; medial geniculate nucleus; lobe of cerebellum; medial dorsal nucleus; seminiferous tubule; cerebellar vermis; lumbar subsegment of spinal cord; spermatid; More reference expression data
BioGPS	More reference expression data
Gene ontology
Molecular function	protein binding
Cellular component	cytoplasm; integral component of membrane; extracellular region; cell junction; soma; receptor complex; plasma membrane; dendrite; intracellular anatomical structure; membrane; bicellular tight junction; extracellular space
Biological process	angiogenesis; spinal cord development
Sources:Amigo / QuickGO
Orthologs
Databases	NCBI: entry; OMA: entry
Species	Human	Mouse
Entrez	57125	72324
Ensembl	ENSG00000161381	ENSMUSG00000017417
UniProt	Q8IUK5	Q91ZV7
RefSeq (mRNA)	NM_020405	NM_001163608; NM_028199
RefSeq (protein)	NP_065138	NP_001157080; NP_082475
Location (UCSC)	Chr 17: 39.06 – 39.15 Mb	Chr 11: 97.81 – 97.88 Mb
PubMed search
- Wikidata
View/Edit Human	View/Edit Mouse

Plexin domain-containing protein 1 is a protein that in humans is encoded by the PLXDC1 gene.

== See also ==
- Plexin
- PLXDC2
- Protein domain
