= DPYSL4 =

Protein-coding gene in the species Homo sapiens

Identifiers
- Aliases: DPYSL4, CRMP3, DRP-4, ULIP4, dihydropyrimidinase like 4
- External IDs: OMIM: 608407; MGI: 1349764; GeneCards: DPYSL4

Gene location (Human)
Chr.	Chromosome 10 (human)
Band	10q26.3	Start	132,186,948 bp
Band	10q26.3	End	132,205,759 bp

Gene location (Mouse)
Chr.	Chromosome 7 (mouse)
Band	7|7 F4	Start	138,665,917 bp
Band	7|7 F4	End	138,682,620 bp
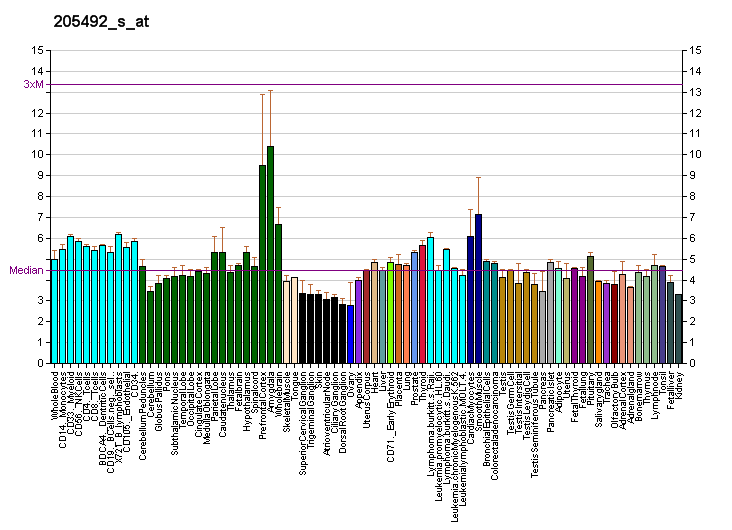

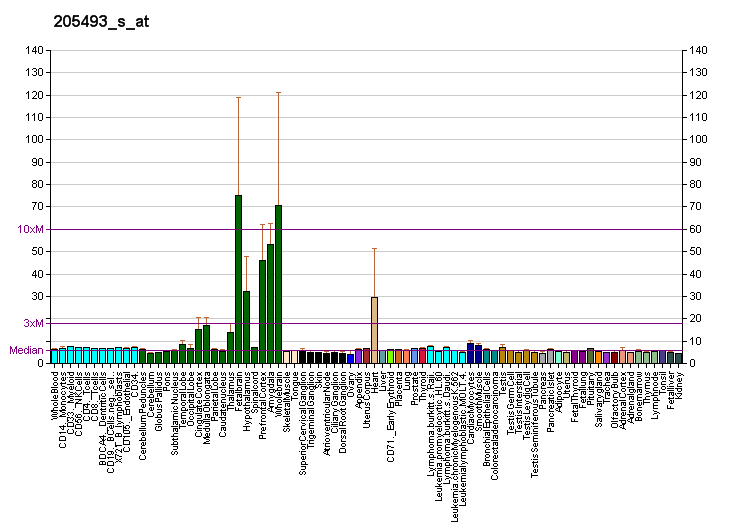
RNA expression pattern
Bgee	Human / Mouse (ortholog); Top expressed in: apex of heart; ganglionic eminence; right frontal lobe; endothelial cell; prefrontal cortex; ventricular zone; Brodmann area 9; cingulate gyrus; anterior cingulate cortex; C1 segment / Top expressed in: neural tube; mesencephalon; rhombencephalon; cerebellar cortex; ovary; layer of retina; neural layer of retina; ventricular zone; dentate gyrus of hippocampal formation granule cell; primary visual cortex; More reference expression data
BioGPS	More reference expression data
Gene ontology
Molecular function	protein binding; hydrolase activity; hydrolase activity, acting on carbon-nitrogen (but not peptide) bonds; filamin binding
Cellular component	cytoplasm; cytosol
Biological process	neuron death; neuron projection guidance; nervous system development
Sources:Amigo / QuickGO
Orthologs
Databases	NCBI: entry; OMA: entry
Species	Human	Mouse
Entrez	10570	26757
Ensembl	ENSG00000151640	ENSMUSG00000025478
UniProt	O14531	O35098
RefSeq (mRNA)	NM_006426	NM_011993
RefSeq (protein)	NP_006417	n/a
Location (UCSC)	Chr 10: 132.19 – 132.21 Mb	Chr 7: 138.67 – 138.68 Mb
PubMed search
- Wikidata
View/Edit Human	View/Edit Mouse

Dihydropyrimidinase-related protein 4 is an enzyme that in humans is encoded by the DPYSL4 gene.
