= FAM170B =

Protein-coding gene in the species Homo sapiens

Identifiers
- Aliases: FAM170B, C10orf73, family with sequence similarity 170 member B
- External IDs: MGI: 2145650; HomoloGene: 19055; GeneCards: FAM170B; OMA:FAM170B - orthologs

Gene location (Human)
Chr.	Chromosome 10 (human)
Band	10q11.23	Start	49,131,154 bp
Band	10q11.23	End	49,134,021 bp

Gene location (Mouse)
Chr.	Chromosome 14 (mouse)
Band	14|14 B	Start	32,555,919 bp
Band	14|14 B	End	32,558,746 bp
RNA expression pattern
Bgee	Human / Mouse (ortholog); Top expressed in: testicle; left testis; right testis; blood; duodenum; human musculoskeletal system; muscular system; skeletal muscle; lower limb muscles; muscle of leg / Top expressed in: spermatid; seminiferous tubule; embryo; ascending aorta; aortic valve; supraoptic nucleus; spermatocyte; Paneth cell; cumulus cell; embryo; More reference expression data
BioGPS	n/a
Gene ontology
Molecular function	protein binding
Cellular component	acrosomal vesicle; outer acrosomal membrane; membrane; cytoplasmic vesicle
Biological process	positive regulation of acrosome reaction; regulation of fertilization
Sources:Amigo / QuickGO
Orthologs
Species	Human	Mouse
Entrez	170370	105511
Ensembl	ENSG00000172538	ENSMUSG00000078127
UniProt	A6NMN3	E9PXT9
RefSeq (mRNA)	NM_001164484	NM_001164485
RefSeq (protein)	NP_001157956	NP_001157957
Location (UCSC)	Chr 10: 49.13 – 49.13 Mb	Chr 14: 32.56 – 32.56 Mb
PubMed search
- Wikidata
View/Edit Human	View/Edit Mouse

Family with sequence similarity 170 member B is a protein that is encoded by the FAM170B gene in humans.
