= NRBF2 =

Protein-coding gene in the species Homo sapiens

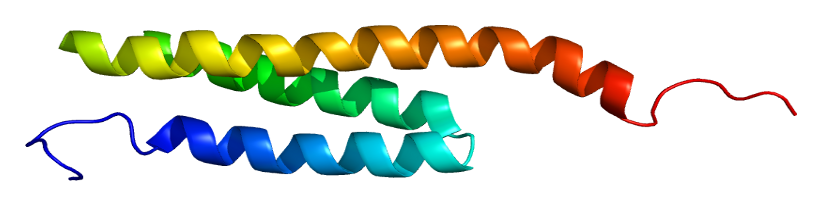
Available structures
PDB	Ortholog search: PDBe RCSB
PDB	List of PDB id codes 4ZEY

Identifiers
- Aliases: NRBF2, COPR1, COPR2, NRBF-2, COPR, nuclear receptor binding factor 2
- External IDs: OMIM: 616477; MGI: 1354950; HomoloGene: 41473; GeneCards: NRBF2; OMA:NRBF2 - orthologs

Gene location (Human)
Chr.	Chromosome 10 (human)
Band	10q21.3	Start	63,133,247 bp
Band	10q21.3	End	63,155,031 bp

Gene location (Mouse)
Chr.	Chromosome 10 (mouse)
Band	10|10 B5.1	Start	67,102,468 bp
Band	10|10 B5.1	End	67,121,084 bp
RNA expression pattern
Bgee	Human / Mouse (ortholog); Top expressed in: buccal mucosa cell; blood; amniotic fluid; white blood cell; monocyte; Achilles tendon; right lobe of liver; granulocyte; bone marrow; gonad / Top expressed in: muscle of thigh; granulocyte; proximal tubule; right kidney; quadriceps femoris muscle; zygote; neural tube; secondary oocyte; lip; skeletal muscle tissue; More reference expression data
BioGPS	n/a
Gene ontology
Molecular function	protein binding
Cellular component	cytoplasm; phosphatidylinositol 3-kinase complex, class III; autophagosome; nucleus; nucleoplasm; cytoplasmic vesicle
Biological process	transcription initiation from RNA polymerase II promoter; regulation of transcription, DNA-templated; response to endoplasmic reticulum stress; transcription, DNA-templated; regulation of lipid kinase activity; autophagy
Sources:Amigo / QuickGO
Orthologs
Species	Human	Mouse
Entrez	29982	641340
Ensembl	ENSG00000148572	ENSMUSG00000075000
UniProt	Q96F24	Q8VCQ3
RefSeq (mRNA)	NM_001282405; NM_030759	NM_001036293
RefSeq (protein)	NP_001269334; NP_110386	NP_001031370; NP_001388976; NP_001388977
Location (UCSC)	Chr 10: 63.13 – 63.16 Mb	Chr 10: 67.1 – 67.12 Mb
PubMed search
- Wikidata
View/Edit Human	View/Edit Mouse

Nuclear receptor-binding factor 2 is a protein that in humans is encoded by the NRBF2 gene.
