= GPR15LG =

Protein-coding gene in the species Homo sapiens

Identifiers
- Aliases: GPR15LG, UNQ1833, AP-57, CSBF, chromosome 10 open reading frame 99, GPR15L, AP57
- External IDs: OMIM: 617775; MGI: 1917295; HomoloGene: 89343; GeneCards: GPR15LG; OMA:GPR15LG - orthologs

Gene location (Human)
Chr.	Chromosome 10 (human)
Band	10q23.1	Start	84,173,801 bp
Band	10q23.1	End	84,185,294 bp

Gene location (Mouse)
Chr.	Chromosome 14 (mouse)
Band	14|14 B	Start	36,824,097 bp
Band	14|14 B	End	36,835,979 bp
RNA expression pattern
Bgee	Human / Mouse (ortholog); Top expressed in: gingival epithelium; mucosa of transverse colon; mucosa of ileum; rectum; mucosa of sigmoid colon; mucosa of esophagus; mucosa of pharynx; human penis; oral cavity; vulva / Top expressed in: corneal stroma; left colon; tail of embryo; esophagus; decidua; gastrula; conjunctival fornix; lip; migratory enteric neural crest cell; seminiferous tubule; More reference expression data
BioGPS	n/a
Gene ontology
Molecular function	cytokine activity; G protein-coupled receptor binding; protein binding; chemokine activity; receptor ligand activity
Cellular component	extracellular region; extracellular space
Biological process	negative regulation of cell division; defense response to bacterium; defense response to fungus; negative regulation of cell cycle G1/S phase transition; defense response to Gram-positive bacterium; regulation of signaling receptor activity; chemotaxis; G protein-coupled receptor signaling pathway; lymphocyte chemotaxis; regulation of T cell migration
Sources:Amigo / QuickGO
Orthologs
Species	Human	Mouse
Entrez	387695	70045
Ensembl	ENSG00000188373	ENSMUSG00000096001
UniProt	Q6UWK7	A0A0B4J1N3
RefSeq (mRNA)	NM_207373	NM_001206684
RefSeq (protein)	NP_997256	NP_001193613
Location (UCSC)	Chr 10: 84.17 – 84.19 Mb	Chr 14: 36.82 – 36.84 Mb
PubMed search
- Wikidata
View/Edit Human	View/Edit Mouse

Protein GPR15LG is a protein that in humans is encoded by the GPR15LG gene.
