= Peroxiredoxin-like 2A =

Protein-coding gene in the species Homo sapiens

PRXL2A

Identifiers
- Aliases: PRXL2A, C10orf58, PAMM, family with sequence similarity 213 member A, Adrx, FAM213A, peroxiredoxin like 2A
- External IDs: OMIM: 617165; MGI: 1917814; HomoloGene: 12356; GeneCards: PRXL2A; OMA:PRXL2A - orthologs

Gene location (Human)
Chr.	Chromosome 10 (human)
Band	10q23.1	Start	80,407,829 bp
Band	10q23.1	End	80,437,115 bp

Gene location (Mouse)
Chr.	Chromosome 14 (mouse)
Band	14|14 B	Start	40,715,697 bp
Band	14|14 B	End	40,735,745 bp
RNA expression pattern
Bgee	Human / Mouse (ortholog); Top expressed in: retinal pigment epithelium; corpus epididymis; myocardium of left ventricle; skin of thigh; mucosa of ileum; jejunal mucosa; skin of arm; caput epididymis; skin of hip; vulva / Top expressed in: retinal pigment epithelium; blood; utricle; tunica adventitia of aorta; ciliary body; brown adipose tissue; Epithelium of choroid plexus; white adipose tissue; vestibular sensory epithelium; dorsomedial hypothalamic nucleus; More reference expression data
BioGPS	n/a
Gene ontology
Molecular function	antioxidant activity
Cellular component	cytoplasm; extracellular region
Biological process	regulation of osteoclast differentiation; cellular oxidant detoxification
Sources:Amigo / QuickGO
Orthologs
Species	Human	Mouse
Entrez	84293	70564
Ensembl	ENSG00000122378	ENSMUSG00000021792
UniProt	Q9BRX8	Q9CYH2
RefSeq (mRNA)	NM_001243778; NM_001243779; NM_001243780; NM_001243781; NM_001243782 NM_032333	NM_027464; NM_001316732; NM_001316733; NM_001316734; NM_001316735 NM_001316736; NM_001316737; NM_001316739; NM_001316740; NM_001378813; NM_001378814; NM_001378815
RefSeq (protein)	NP_001230707; NP_001230708; NP_001230709; NP_001230710; NP_001230711 NP_115709	NP_001303661; NP_001303662; NP_001303663; NP_001303664; NP_001303665 NP_001303666; NP_001303668; NP_001303669; NP_081740; NP_001365742; NP_001365743; NP_001365744
Location (UCSC)	Chr 10: 80.41 – 80.44 Mb	Chr 14: 40.72 – 40.74 Mb
PubMed search
- Wikidata
View/Edit Human	View/Edit Mouse

Peroxiredoxin-like 2A is a protein that in humans is encoded by the PRXL2A gene. PRXL2A is also known as redox-regulatory protein FAM213A and peroxiredoxin-like 2 activated in M-CSF stimulated monocytes (PAMM).
