= STAMBPL1 =

Protein-coding gene in the species Homo sapiens

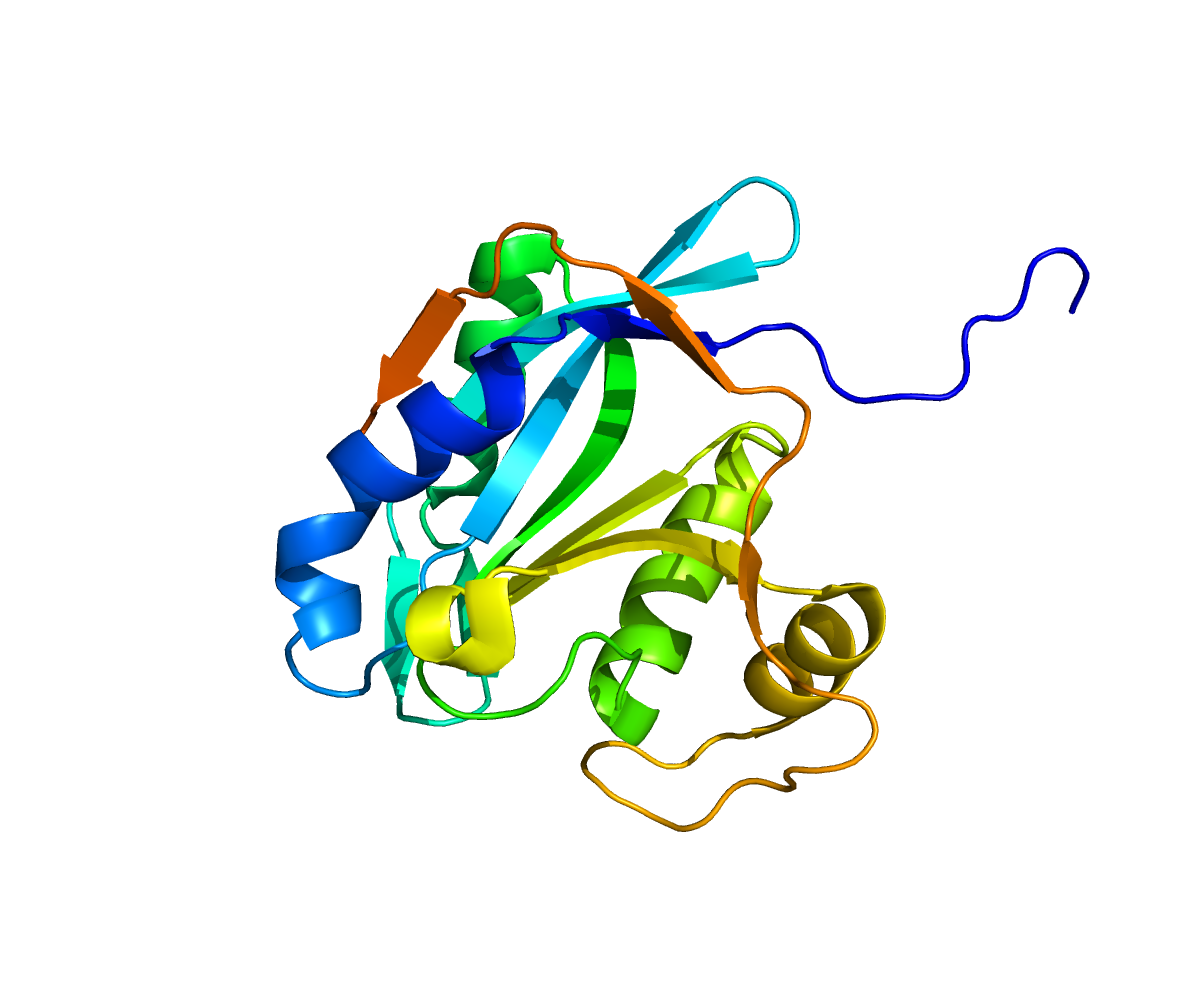
Available structures
PDB	Ortholog search: PDBe RCSB
PDB	List of PDB id codes 2ZNR, 2ZNV

Identifiers
- Aliases: STAMBPL1, ALMalpha, AMSH-FP, AMSH-LP, bA399O19.2, STAM binding protein like 1
- External IDs: OMIM: 612352; MGI: 1923880; HomoloGene: 23253; GeneCards: STAMBPL1; OMA:STAMBPL1 - orthologs

Gene location (Human)
Chr.	Chromosome 10 (human)
Band	10q23.31	Start	88,879,734 bp
Band	10q23.31	End	88,975,153 bp

Gene location (Mouse)
Chr.	Chromosome 19 (mouse)
Band	19|19 C1	Start	34,169,629 bp
Band	19|19 C1	End	34,217,733 bp
RNA expression pattern
Bgee	Human / Mouse (ortholog); Top expressed in: mucosa of ileum; endothelial cell; Brodmann area 23; mucosa of sigmoid colon; middle temporal gyrus; primary visual cortex; pancreatic epithelial cell; cardiac muscle tissue of right atrium; stromal cell of endometrium; epithelium of nasopharynx / Top expressed in: spermatid; seminiferous tubule; thymus; granulocyte; epithelium of small intestine; spermatocyte; stria vascularis; gastrula; tibiofemoral joint; visual cortex; More reference expression data
BioGPS	n/a
Gene ontology
Molecular function	peptidase activity; protein binding; hydrolase activity; metallopeptidase activity; metal ion binding; Lys63-specific deubiquitinase activity; thiol-dependent deubiquitinase
Cellular component	membrane; cytosol; endosome
Biological process	proteolysis; protein deubiquitination; protein K63-linked deubiquitination
Sources:Amigo / QuickGO
Orthologs
Species	Human	Mouse
Entrez	57559	76630
Ensembl	ENSG00000138134	ENSMUSG00000024776
UniProt	Q96FJ0	Q76N33
RefSeq (mRNA)	NM_020799	NM_029682; NM_001360716; NM_001360717; NM_001360718; NM_001360719 NM_001360720
RefSeq (protein)	NP_065850	NP_083958; NP_001347645; NP_001347646; NP_001347647; NP_001347648 NP_001347649
Location (UCSC)	Chr 10: 88.88 – 88.98 Mb	Chr 19: 34.17 – 34.22 Mb
PubMed search
- Wikidata
View/Edit Human	View/Edit Mouse

AMSH-like protease is an enzyme that in humans is encoded by the STAMBPL1 gene.
