= Ubiquitin specific peptidase 54 =

Protein-coding gene in the species Homo sapiens

USP54

Identifiers
- Aliases: USP54, C10orf29, bA137L10.3, bA137L10.4, ubiquitin specific peptidase 54
- External IDs: MGI: 1926037; GeneCards: USP54
Enzyme activity
EC #	BRENDA	ExPASy	KEGG	MetaCyc
3.4.19.12	↗	↗	↗	↗

Gene location (Human)
Chr.	Chromosome 10 (human)
Band	10q22.2	Start	73,497,538 bp
Band	10q22.2	End	73,625,953 bp

Gene location (Mouse)
Chr.	Chromosome 14 (mouse)
Band	14|14 A3	Start	20,548,912 bp
Band	14|14 A3	End	20,641,063 bp
RNA expression pattern
Bgee	Human / Mouse (ortholog); Top expressed in: tibialis anterior muscle; corpus callosum; inferior ganglion of vagus nerve; C1 segment; gastrocnemius muscle; subthalamic nucleus; deltoid muscle; medulla oblongata; right lobe of thyroid gland; left lobe of thyroid gland / Top expressed in: lumbar subsegment of spinal cord; otic vesicle; interventricular septum; primary visual cortex; otolith organ; deep cerebellar nuclei; zygote; utricle; secondary oocyte; superior frontal gyrus; More reference expression data
BioGPS	n/a
Orthologs
Databases	NCBI: entry; OMA: entry
Species	Human	Mouse
Entrez	159195	78787
Ensembl	ENSG00000166348	ENSMUSG00000034235
UniProt	Q70EL1	Q8BL06
RefSeq (mRNA)	NM_152586; NM_001320437; NM_001320441; NM_001350995	NM_030180
RefSeq (protein)	NP_001307366; NP_001307370; NP_689799; NP_001337924; NP_001365137 NP_001365138; NP_001365139	NP_084456; NP_001390006; NP_001390007; NP_001390008; NP_001390009 NP_001390010
Location (UCSC)	Chr 10: 73.5 – 73.63 Mb	Chr 14: 20.55 – 20.64 Mb
PubMed search
- Wikidata
View/Edit Human	View/Edit Mouse

Ubiquitin specific peptidase 54 is a protein that in humans is encoded by the USP54 gene.
