= CDH23-AS1 =

Protein-coding gene in humans

Identifiers
- Aliases: CDH23-AS1, CDH23 antisense RNA 1, NCRNA00223, C10orf106, bA327E2.3
- External IDs: GeneCards: CDH23-AS1

Gene location (Human)
Chr.	Chromosome 10 (human)
Band	10q22.1	Start	71,508,153 bp
Band	10q22.1	End	71,511,873 bp
RNA expression pattern
Bgee	Human / Mouse (ortholog); Top expressed in: blood; monocyte; lactiferous gland; prefrontal cortex; liver; gallbladder; endometrium; Achilles tendon; renal cortex; dorsolateral prefrontal cortex / n/a; More reference expression data
BioGPS	n/a
Orthologs
Databases	NCBI: entry; OMA: entry
Species	Human	Mouse
Entrez	102723377	n/a
Ensembl	ENSG00000223817	n/a
UniProt	n a	n/a
RefSeq (mRNA)	n/a	n/a
RefSeq (protein)	n/a	n/a
Location (UCSC)	Chr 10: 71.51 – 71.51 Mb	n/a
PubMed search		n/a
- Wikidata
View/Edit Human

CDH23 antisense RNA 1 is a protein that in humans is encoded by the CDH23-AS1 gene.
