= OTUD1 =

Protein-coding gene in the species Homo sapiens

Identifiers
- Aliases: OTUD1, DUBA7, OTDC1, OTU deubiquitinase 1
- External IDs: OMIM: 612022; MGI: 1918448; GeneCards: OTUD1
Available structures
PDB	Ortholog search: PDBe RCSB
PDB	List of PDB id codes 4BOP
Enzyme activity
EC #	BRENDA	ExPASy	KEGG	MetaCyc
3.4.19.12	↗	↗	↗	↗

Gene location (Human)
Chr.	Chromosome 10 (human)
Band	10p12.2	Start	23,439,075 bp
Band	10p12.2	End	23,442,377 bp

Gene location (Mouse)
Chr.	Chromosome 2 (mouse)
Band	2|2 A3	Start	19,662,563 bp
Band	2|2 A3	End	19,665,394 bp
RNA expression pattern
Bgee	Human / Mouse (ortholog); Top expressed in: buccal mucosa cell; Skeletal muscle tissue of rectus abdominis; myocardium of left ventricle; cardiac muscle tissue of right atrium; skin of arm; tibialis anterior muscle; amniotic fluid; muscle of thigh; skin of thigh; vena cava / Top expressed in: ascending aorta; aortic valve; soleus muscle; tibialis anterior muscle; quadriceps femoris muscle; thoracic diaphragm; muscle of thigh; secondary oocyte; digastric muscle; ankle; More reference expression data
BioGPS	n/a
Orthologs
Databases	NCBI: entry; OMA: entry
Species	Human	Mouse
Entrez	220213	71198
Ensembl	ENSG00000165312	ENSMUSG00000043415
UniProt	Q5VV17	Q9CUB6
RefSeq (mRNA)	NM_001145373	NM_027715
RefSeq (protein)	NP_001138845	NP_081991
Location (UCSC)	Chr 10: 23.44 – 23.44 Mb	Chr 2: 19.66 – 19.67 Mb
PubMed search
- Wikidata
View/Edit Human	View/Edit Mouse

OTU deubiquitinase 1 is a protein that in humans is encoded by the OTUD1 gene.

== Function ==
Deubiquitinating enzymes (DUBs; see MIM 603478) are proteases that specifically cleave ubiquitin (MIM 191339) linkages, negating the action of ubiquitin ligases. DUBA7 belongs to a DUB subfamily characterized by an ovarian tumor (OTU) domain.
