= COMMD3-BMI1 =

Protein-coding gene in humans

Available structures
PDB	Ortholog search: PDBe RCSB
PDB	List of PDB id codes 2H0D, 3RPG, 4R8P

Identifiers
- Aliases: COMMD3-BMI1, COMMD3-BMI1 readthrough, BMI1, RNF51, PCGF4
- External IDs: MGI: 88174; HomoloGene: 3797; GeneCards: COMMD3-BMI1; OMA:COMMD3-BMI1 - orthologs

Gene location (Human)
Chr.	Chromosome 10 (human)
Band	10p12.2	Start	22,316,388 bp
Band	10p12.2	End	22,329,542 bp

Gene location (Mouse)
Chr.	Chromosome 2 (mouse)
Band	2 A3|2 12.9 cM	Start	18,681,829 bp
Band	2 A3|2 12.9 cM	End	18,691,440 bp
RNA expression pattern
Bgee	Human / Mouse (ortholog); Top expressed in: testicle; corpus callosum; gonad; islet of Langerhans; bone marrow cell; sural nerve; stromal cell of endometrium; duodenum; Achilles tendon; tonsil / Top expressed in: zygote; secondary oocyte; plantaris muscle; extensor digitorum longus muscle; superior surface of tongue; primary oocyte; medial ganglionic eminence; interventricular septum; gallbladder; neural layer of retina; More reference expression data
BioGPS	n/a
Gene ontology
Molecular function	promoter-specific chromatin binding; RING-like zinc finger domain binding; metal ion binding; protein binding; zinc ion binding
Cellular component	cytoplasm; ubiquitin ligase complex; nucleoplasm; PRC1 complex; PcG protein complex; nucleus; cytosol; nuclear body
Biological process	regulation of transcription, DNA-templated; positive regulation of fibroblast proliferation; negative regulation of transcription by RNA polymerase II; transcription, DNA-templated; segment specification; negative regulation of gene expression, epigenetic; positive regulation of ubiquitin-protein transferase activity; regulation of gene expression; histone H2A-K119 monoubiquitination; negative regulation of G0 to G1 transition; chromatin organization; hemopoiesis
Sources:Amigo / QuickGO
Orthologs
Species	Human	Mouse
Entrez	100532731	12151
Ensembl	ENSG00000269897	ENSMUSG00000026739
UniProt	P35226	P25916
RefSeq (mRNA)	NM_001204062	NM_007552
RefSeq (protein)	NP_001190991; NP_005171	NP_031578
Location (UCSC)	Chr 10: 22.32 – 22.33 Mb	Chr 2: 18.68 – 18.69 Mb
PubMed search
- Wikidata
View/Edit Human	View/Edit Mouse

The COMMD3-BMI1 gene in humans encodes the COMMD3-BMI1 readthrough protein.

== Function ==
This locus represents naturally occurring read-through transcription between the neighboring COMM domain-containing protein 3 and polycomb complex protein BMI-1 genes on chromosome 10. The read-through transcript produces a fusion protein that shares sequence identity with each individual gene product.
