= VIM antisense RNA 1 =

Non-coding RNA in humans

VIM-AS1

Identifiers
- Aliases: VIM-AS1, VIM antisense RNA 1
- External IDs: GeneCards: VIM-AS1

Gene location (Human)
Chr.	Chromosome 10 (human)
Band	10p13	Start	17,214,239 bp
Band	10p13	End	17,230,018 bp
RNA expression pattern
Bgee	Human / Mouse (ortholog); Top expressed in: monocyte; testicle; granulocyte; blood; spleen; bone marrow cell; olfactory zone of nasal mucosa; lymph node; gonad; right uterine tube / n/a; More reference expression data
BioGPS	n/a
Orthologs
Databases	NCBI: entry; OMA: entry
Species	Human	Mouse
Entrez	100507347	n/a
Ensembl	ENSG00000229124	n/a
UniProt	n a	n/a
RefSeq (mRNA)	n/a	n/a
RefSeq (protein)	n/a	n/a
Location (UCSC)	Chr 10: 17.21 – 17.23 Mb	n/a
PubMed search		n/a
- Wikidata
View/Edit Human

VIM antisense RNA 1 is a non-coding RNA that in humans is encoded by the VIM-AS1 gene.
