= FRAT1 =

Protein-coding gene in the species Homo sapiens

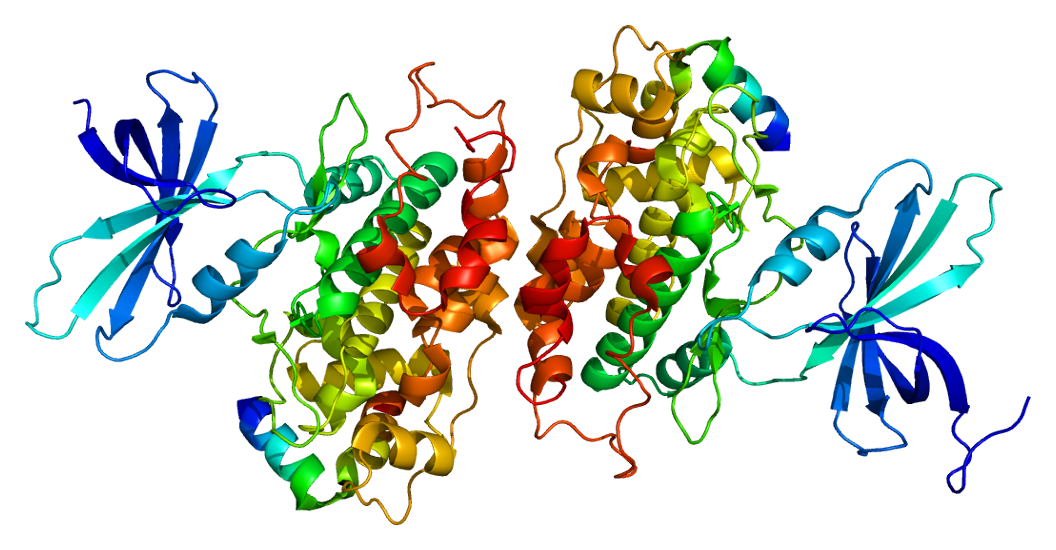
Available structures
PDB	Ortholog search: PDBe RCSB
PDB	List of PDB id codes 1GNG, 3ZRK, 3ZRL, 3ZRM, 4AFJ

Identifiers
- Aliases: FRAT1, WNT signaling pathway regulator, FRAT regulator of WNT signaling pathway 1
- External IDs: OMIM: 602503; MGI: 109450; HomoloGene: 3999; GeneCards: FRAT1; OMA:FRAT1 - orthologs

Gene location (Human)
Chr.	Chromosome 10 (human)
Band	10q24.1	Start	97,319,271 bp
Band	10q24.1	End	97,321,915 bp

Gene location (Mouse)
Chr.	Chromosome 19 (mouse)
Band	19 C3|19 35.3 cM	Start	41,818,409 bp
Band	19 C3|19 35.3 cM	End	41,821,022 bp
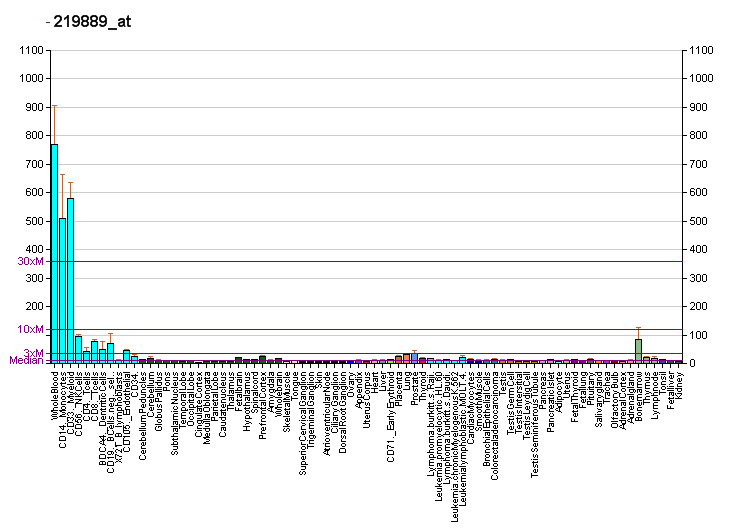
RNA expression pattern
Bgee	Human / Mouse (ortholog); Top expressed in: blood; monocyte; testicle; granulocyte; pancreatic ductal cell; secondary oocyte; gonad; right lobe of liver; bone marrow; spleen / Top expressed in: spermatid; granulocyte; muscle of thigh; neural layer of retina; embryo; spermatocyte; morula; duodenum; CA3 field; Rostral migratory stream; More reference expression data
BioGPS	More reference expression data
Gene ontology
Molecular function	protein binding
Cellular component	cytosol; intracellular membrane-bounded organelle; cytoplasm
Biological process	Wnt signaling pathway; beta-catenin destruction complex disassembly; canonical Wnt signaling pathway; positive regulation of canonical Wnt signaling pathway
Sources:Amigo / QuickGO
Orthologs
Species	Human	Mouse
Entrez	10023	14296
Ensembl	ENSG00000165879	ENSMUSG00000067199
UniProt	Q92837	P70339
RefSeq (mRNA)	NM_181355; NM_005479	NM_008043
RefSeq (protein)	NP_005470	NP_032069
Location (UCSC)	Chr 10: 97.32 – 97.32 Mb	Chr 19: 41.82 – 41.82 Mb
PubMed search
- Wikidata
View/Edit Human	View/Edit Mouse

Proto-oncogene FRAT1 is a protein that in humans is encoded by the FRAT1 gene.

The protein encoded by this gene belongs to the GSK-3-binding protein family. It may function in tumor progression and in lymphomagenesis.
