= USP6NL =

Protein-coding gene in the species Homo sapiens

Identifiers
- Aliases: USP6NL, RNTRE, TRE2NL, USP6NL-IT1, USP6 N-terminal like
- External IDs: OMIM: 605405; MGI: 2138893; GeneCards: USP6NL

Gene location (Human)
Chr.	Chromosome 10 (human)
Band	10p14	Start	11,460,510 bp
Band	10p14	End	11,611,666 bp

Gene location (Mouse)
Chr.	Chromosome 2 (mouse)
Band	2|2 A1	Start	6,327,478 bp
Band	2|2 A1	End	6,451,201 bp
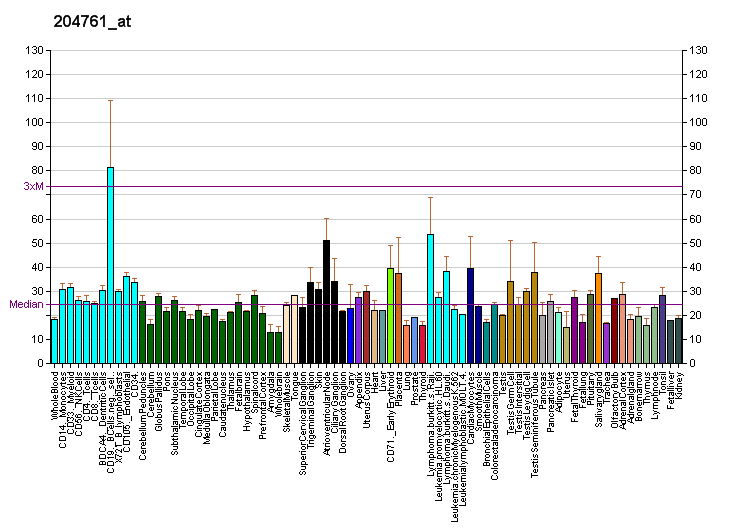
RNA expression pattern
Bgee	Human / Mouse (ortholog); Top expressed in: amniotic fluid; sperm; oral cavity; epithelium of nasopharynx; ventricular zone; gums; tonsil; gingival epithelium; palpebral conjunctiva; tibia / Top expressed in: sciatic nerve; otolith organ; utricle; hand; hair follicle; retinal pigment epithelium; genital tubercle; pineal gland; tail of embryo; conjunctival fornix; More reference expression data
BioGPS	More reference expression data
Gene ontology
Molecular function	GTPase activator activity
Cellular component	plasma membrane; Golgi apparatus; cytoplasmic vesicle; cytosol; endomembrane system; trans-Golgi network membrane
Biological process	regulation of cilium assembly; retrograde transport, plasma membrane to Golgi; regulation of Golgi organization; Golgi organization; plasma membrane to endosome transport; activation of GTPase activity; regulation of vesicle fusion; intracellular protein transport; positive regulation of GTPase activity
Sources:Amigo / QuickGO
Orthologs
Databases	NCBI: entry; OMA: entry
Species	Human	Mouse
Entrez	9712	98910
Ensembl	ENSG00000148429	ENSMUSG00000039046
UniProt	Q92738	Q80XC3
RefSeq (mRNA)	NM_001080491; NM_014688; NM_001391959; NM_001391960; NM_001391961	NM_001080548; NM_181399
RefSeq (protein)	NP_001073960; NP_055503	NP_001074017; NP_852064
Location (UCSC)	Chr 10: 11.46 – 11.61 Mb	Chr 2: 6.33 – 6.45 Mb
PubMed search
- Wikidata
View/Edit Human	View/Edit Mouse

USP6 N-terminal-like protein is a protein that in humans is encoded by the USP6NL gene.
