= SUPV3L1 =

Protein-coding gene in the species Homo sapiens

Available structures
PDB	Ortholog search: PDBe RCSB
PDB	List of PDB id codes 3RC3, 3RC8

Identifiers
- Aliases: SUPV3L1, SUV3, Suv3 like RNA helicase
- External IDs: OMIM: 605122; MGI: 2441711; HomoloGene: 2386; GeneCards: SUPV3L1; OMA:SUPV3L1 - orthologs

Gene location (Human)
Chr.	Chromosome 10 (human)
Band	10q22.1	Start	69,180,234 bp
Band	10q22.1	End	69,209,099 bp

Gene location (Mouse)
Chr.	Chromosome 10 (mouse)
Band	10|10 B4	Start	62,264,988 bp
Band	10|10 B4	End	62,285,517 bp
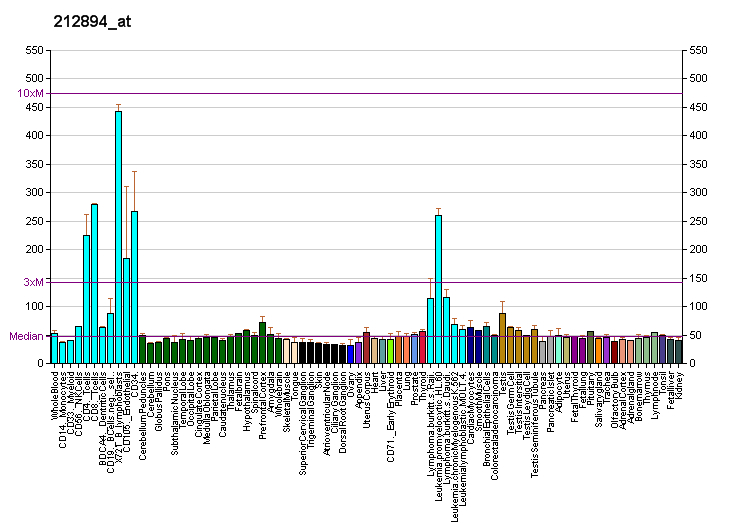
RNA expression pattern
Bgee	Human / Mouse (ortholog); Top expressed in: oocyte; secondary oocyte; apex of heart; mucosa of transverse colon; cerebellar hemisphere; gastrocnemius muscle; right testis; left testis; right hemisphere of cerebellum; right lobe of liver / Top expressed in: otic placode; saccule; otic vesicle; zygote; secondary oocyte; epiblast; primary oocyte; right ventricle; brown adipose tissue; morula; More reference expression data
BioGPS	More reference expression data
Gene ontology
Molecular function	DNA binding; nucleotide binding; protein homodimerization activity; helicase activity; 3'-5' RNA helicase activity; hydrolase activity, acting on acid anhydrides; DNA helicase activity; protein binding; double-stranded RNA binding; ATP binding; hydrolase activity; RNA binding
Cellular component	mitochondrial degradosome; mitochondrial matrix; mitochondrion; mitochondrial nucleoid; nucleus
Biological process	DNA recombination; mitochondrial mRNA catabolic process; mitochondrial ncRNA surveillance; mitochondrial RNA 3'-end processing; RNA catabolic process; negative regulation of apoptotic process; positive regulation of cell growth; DNA duplex unwinding; mitochondrial mRNA surveillance; mitochondrion morphogenesis; mitochondrial RNA surveillance; positive regulation of mitochondrial RNA catabolic process
Sources:Amigo / QuickGO
Orthologs
Species	Human	Mouse
Entrez	6832	338359
Ensembl	ENSG00000156502	ENSMUSG00000020079
UniProt	Q8IYB8	Q80YD1
RefSeq (mRNA)	NM_001301683; NM_003171; NM_001323584; NM_001323585; NM_001323586 NM_001323587; NM_001323588	NM_181423; NM_001359806
RefSeq (protein)	NP_001288612; NP_001310513; NP_001310514; NP_001310515; NP_001310516 NP_001310517; NP_003162	NP_852088; NP_001346735
Location (UCSC)	Chr 10: 69.18 – 69.21 Mb	Chr 10: 62.26 – 62.29 Mb
PubMed search
- Wikidata
View/Edit Human	View/Edit Mouse

ATP-dependent RNA helicase SUPV3L1, mitochondrial is an enzyme that in humans is encoded by the SUPV3L1 gene.
