= F-box and leucine rich repeat protein 15 =

Protein-coding gene in the species Homo sapiens

FBXL15

Identifiers
- Aliases: FBXL15, FBXO37, Fbl15, JET, PSD, F-box and leucine-rich repeat protein 15, F-box and leucine rich repeat protein 15
- External IDs: OMIM: 610287; MGI: 1915681; GeneCards: FBXL15

Gene location (Human)
| Chr. | Chromosome 10 (human) |
| Band | 10q24.32 | Start | 102,419,189 bp |
| Band | 10q24.32 | End | 102,423,136 bp |

Gene location (Mouse)
| Chr. | Chromosome 19 (mouse) |
| Band | 19|19 C3 | Start | 46,316,623 bp |
| Band | 19|19 C3 | End | 46,318,885 bp |
RNA expression pattern
| Bgee | Human / Mouse (ortholog); Top expressed in: anterior pituitary; mucosa of transverse colon; right frontal lobe; anterior cingulate cortex; Brodmann area 9; right hemisphere of cerebellum; prefrontal cortex; nucleus accumbens; muscle layer of sigmoid colon; left adrenal gland / Top expressed in: right kidney; facial motor nucleus; proximal tubule; superior frontal gyrus; primary visual cortex; neural tube; anterior horn of spinal cord; embryo; granulocyte; seminiferous tubule; More reference expression data |
| BioGPS | n/a |
Gene ontology
| Molecular function | protein binding; ubiquitin-protein transferase activity |
| Cellular component | cytoplasm; SCF ubiquitin ligase complex; cytosol |
| Biological process | bone mineralization; SCF-dependent proteasomal ubiquitin-dependent protein catabolic process; dorsal/ventral pattern formation; G2/M transition of mitotic cell cycle; protein ubiquitination; positive regulation of BMP signaling pathway; protein polyubiquitination; post-translational protein modification; ubiquitin-dependent protein catabolic process |
Sources:Amigo / QuickGO
Orthologs
| Databases | NCBI: entry; OMA: entry |
| Species | Human | Mouse |
| Entrez | 79176 | 68431 |
| Ensembl | ENSG00000107872 | ENSMUSG00000025226 |
| UniProt | Q9H469 | Q91W61 |
| RefSeq (mRNA) | NM_024326; NM_001387294 | NM_133694; NM_001378773 |
| RefSeq (protein) | NP_077302 | NP_598455; NP_001365702 |
| Location (UCSC) | Chr 10: 102.42 – 102.42 Mb | Chr 19: 46.32 – 46.32 Mb |
| PubMed search |
- Wikidata
| View/Edit Human | View/Edit Mouse |

F-box and leucine rich repeat protein 15 is a protein that in humans is encoded by the FBXL15 gene.
