= MTG1 =

Protein-coding gene in the species Homo sapiens

Identifiers
- Aliases: MTG1, GTP, GTPBP7, mitochondrial ribosome associated GTPase 1
- External IDs: MGI: 2685015; GeneCards: MTG1

Gene location (Human)
Chr.	Chromosome 10 (human)
Band	10q26.3	Start	133,394,094 bp
Band	10q26.3	End	133,422,520 bp

Gene location (Mouse)
Chr.	Chromosome 7 (mouse)
Band	7|7 F4	Start	139,717,477 bp
Band	7|7 F4	End	139,730,699 bp
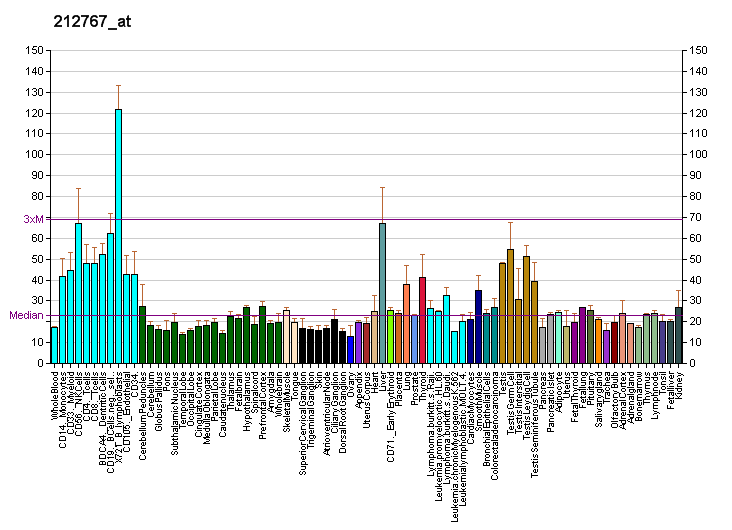
RNA expression pattern
Bgee	Human / Mouse (ortholog); Top expressed in: right lobe of liver; right adrenal gland; pancreatic ductal cell; right adrenal cortex; left adrenal gland; right testis; left adrenal cortex; left testis; right lobe of thyroid gland; gonad / Top expressed in: interventricular septum; muscle of thigh; dentate gyrus of hippocampal formation granule cell; masseter muscle; proximal tubule; right kidney; neural layer of retina; skeletal muscle tissue; brown adipose tissue; quadriceps femoris muscle; More reference expression data
BioGPS	More reference expression data
Gene ontology
Molecular function	nucleotide binding; GTP binding; GTPase activity
Cellular component	mitochondrial inner membrane; mitochondrial matrix; mitochondrial ribosome; mitochondrion; membrane
Biological process	regulation of respiratory system process; regulation of mitochondrial translation; regulation of translation; ribosome biogenesis
Sources:Amigo / QuickGO
Orthologs
Databases	NCBI: entry; OMA: entry
Species	Human	Mouse
Entrez	92170	212508
Ensembl	ENSG00000148824	ENSMUSG00000039018
UniProt	Q9BT17	Q8R2R6
RefSeq (mRNA)	NM_138384	NM_199301
RefSeq (protein)	NP_612393	NP_955005
Location (UCSC)	Chr 10: 133.39 – 133.42 Mb	Chr 7: 139.72 – 139.73 Mb
PubMed search
- Wikidata
View/Edit Human	View/Edit Mouse

Mitochondrial GTPase 1 is an enzyme that in humans is encoded by the MTG1 gene.
