= Zinc finger RANBP2-type containing 1 =

Protein-coding gene in the species Homo sapiens

ZRANB1

Identifiers
- Aliases: ZRANB1, TRABID, zinc finger RANBP2-type containing 1
- External IDs: OMIM: 611749; MGI: 106441; GeneCards: ZRANB1
Available structures
PDB	Ortholog search: PDBe RCSB
PDB	List of PDB id codes 3ZRH, 5AF6
Enzyme activity
EC #	BRENDA	ExPASy	KEGG	MetaCyc
3.4.19.12	↗	↗	↗	↗

Gene location (Human)
Chr.	Chromosome 10 (human)
Band	10q26.13	Start	124,942,123 bp
Band	10q26.13	End	124,988,189 bp

Gene location (Mouse)
Chr.	Chromosome 7 (mouse)
Band	7 F3|7 76.32 cM	Start	132,532,871 bp
Band	7 F3|7 76.32 cM	End	132,588,120 bp
RNA expression pattern
Bgee	Human / Mouse (ortholog); Top expressed in: tibialis anterior muscle; endothelial cell; deltoid muscle; sperm; amniotic fluid; vastus lateralis muscle; upper arm; biceps brachii; skin of arm; Skeletal muscle tissue of biceps brachii / Top expressed in: Rostral migratory stream; spermatocyte; spermatid; pineal gland; muscle of thigh; plantaris muscle; extensor digitorum longus muscle; lobe of cerebellum; cerebellar vermis; neural layer of retina; More reference expression data
BioGPS	n/a
Gene ontology
Molecular function	cysteine-type peptidase activity; metal ion binding; peptidase activity; K63-linked polyubiquitin modification-dependent protein binding; protein binding; thiol-dependent deubiquitinase; hydrolase activity
Cellular component	cytoplasm; nucleoplasm; nucleus; cytosol; intracellular membrane-bounded organelle
Biological process	protein K29-linked deubiquitination; protein deubiquitination involved in ubiquitin-dependent protein catabolic process; Wnt signaling pathway; proteolysis; protein K33-linked deubiquitination; positive regulation of Wnt signaling pathway; protein K63-linked deubiquitination; cytoskeleton organization; regulation of cell morphogenesis; cell migration; protein deubiquitination
Sources:Amigo / QuickGO
Orthologs
Databases	NCBI: entry; OMA: entry
Species	Human	Mouse
Entrez	54764	360216
Ensembl	ENSG00000019995	ENSMUSG00000030967
UniProt	Q9UGI0	Q7M760
RefSeq (mRNA)	NM_017580	NM_207302; NM_001362198; NM_001362199
RefSeq (protein)	NP_060050	NP_997185; NP_001349127; NP_001349128
Location (UCSC)	Chr 10: 124.94 – 124.99 Mb	Chr 7: 132.53 – 132.59 Mb
PubMed search
- Wikidata
View/Edit Human	View/Edit Mouse

Zinc finger RANBP2-type containing 1 is a protein that in humans is encoded by the ZRANB1 gene.
