= NSMCE4A =

Protein-coding gene in the species Homo sapiens

Identifiers
- Aliases: NSMCE4A, C10orf86, NS4EA, NSE4A, NSE4 homolog A, SMC5-SMC6 complex component
- External IDs: OMIM: 612987; MGI: 1915122; HomoloGene: 9745; GeneCards: NSMCE4A; OMA:NSMCE4A - orthologs

Gene location (Human)
Chr.	Chromosome 10 (human)
Band	10q26.13	Start	121,957,091 bp
Band	10q26.13	End	121,975,217 bp

Gene location (Mouse)
Chr.	Chromosome 7 (mouse)
Band	7|7 F3	Start	130,134,256 bp
Band	7|7 F3	End	130,174,848 bp
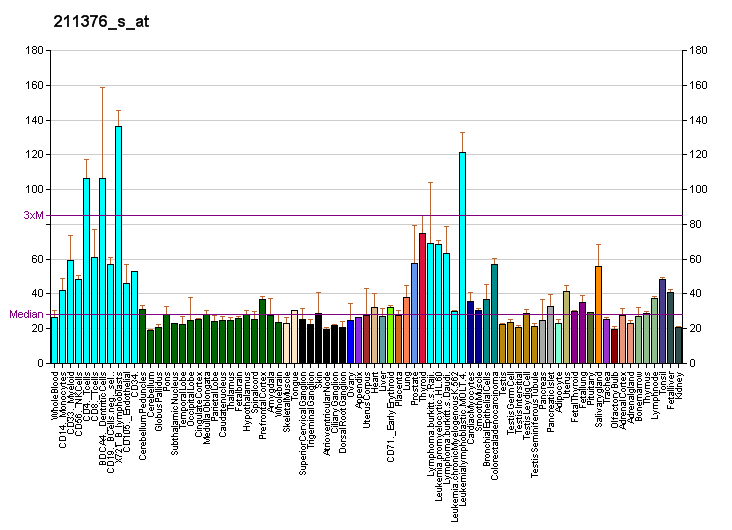

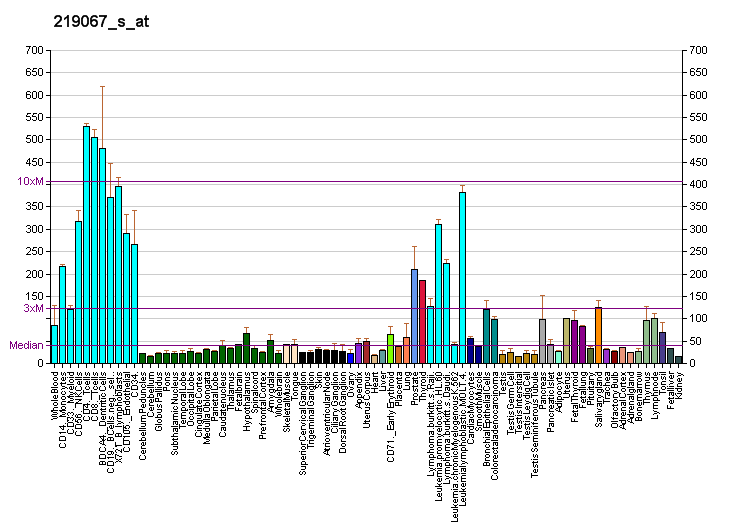
RNA expression pattern
Bgee	Human / Mouse (ortholog); Top expressed in: oocyte; secondary oocyte; gastric mucosa; parotid gland; body of pancreas; muscle layer of sigmoid colon; minor salivary glands; rectum; transverse colon; body of uterus / Top expressed in: mandibular prominence; endocardial cushion; maxillary prominence; epiblast; abdominal wall; medial ganglionic eminence; ventricular zone; hand; migratory enteric neural crest cell; atrioventricular valve; More reference expression data
BioGPS	More reference expression data
Gene ontology
Molecular function	protein binding
Cellular component	telomere; Smc5-Smc6 complex; nucleus; chromosome; nucleoplasm; nuclear body
Biological process	DNA recombination; DNA repair; positive regulation of response to DNA damage stimulus; cellular response to DNA damage stimulus
Sources:Amigo / QuickGO
Orthologs
Species	Human	Mouse
Entrez	54780	67872
Ensembl	ENSG00000107672	ENSMUSG00000040331
UniProt	Q9NXX6	n/a
RefSeq (mRNA)	NM_001167865; NM_017615	NM_001162855
RefSeq (protein)	NP_001161337; NP_060085	n/a
Location (UCSC)	Chr 10: 121.96 – 121.98 Mb	Chr 7: 130.13 – 130.17 Mb
PubMed search
- Wikidata
View/Edit Human	View/Edit Mouse

Non-SMC element 4 homolog A is a protein that in humans is encoded by the NSMCE4A gene.
