= FRAT2 =

Protein-coding gene in the species Homo sapiens

Identifiers
- Aliases: FRAT2, WNT signaling pathway regulator, FRAT-2, FRAT regulator of WNT signaling pathway 2
- External IDs: OMIM: 605006; MGI: 2673967; HomoloGene: 8095; GeneCards: FRAT2; OMA:FRAT2 - orthologs

Gene location (Human)
Chr.	Chromosome 10 (human)
Band	10q24.1	Start	97,332,497 bp
Band	10q24.1	End	97,334,729 bp

Gene location (Mouse)
Chr.	Chromosome 19 (mouse)
Band	19 C3|19 35.33 cM	Start	41,834,411 bp
Band	19 C3|19 35.33 cM	End	41,836,571 bp
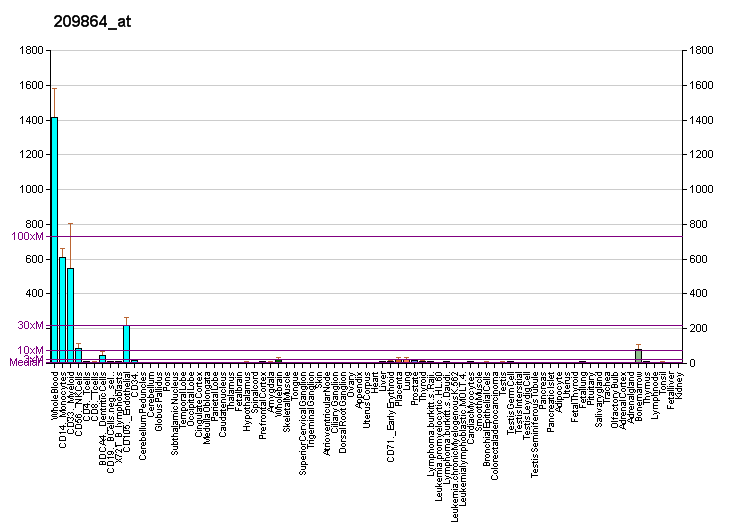
RNA expression pattern
Bgee	Human / Mouse (ortholog); Top expressed in: blood; monocyte; granulocyte; secondary oocyte; mucosa of transverse colon; bone marrow; trabecular bone; jejunal mucosa; duodenum; palpebral conjunctiva / Top expressed in: spermatid; left colon; granulocyte; ventricular zone; extensor digitorum longus muscle; fetal liver hematopoietic progenitor cell; vastus lateralis muscle; ganglionic eminence; knee joint; triceps brachii muscle; More reference expression data
BioGPS	More reference expression data
Gene ontology
Molecular function	molecular function
Cellular component	cytosol; cellular component; cytoplasm
Biological process	multicellular organism development; cell population proliferation; Wnt signaling pathway; beta-catenin destruction complex disassembly
Sources:Amigo / QuickGO
Orthologs
Species	Human	Mouse
Entrez	23401	212398
Ensembl	ENSG00000181274	ENSMUSG00000047604
UniProt	O75474	Q8K025
RefSeq (mRNA)	NM_012083	NM_177603
RefSeq (protein)	NP_036215	NP_808271
Location (UCSC)	Chr 10: 97.33 – 97.33 Mb	Chr 19: 41.83 – 41.84 Mb
PubMed search
- Wikidata
View/Edit Human	View/Edit Mouse

GSK-3-binding protein FRAT2 is a protein that in humans is encoded by the FRAT2 gene.

The protein encoded by this intronless gene belongs to the GSK-3-binding protein family. Studies show that this protein plays a role as a positive regulator of the WNT signaling pathway. It may be upregulated in tumor progression.
