= WW domain binding protein 1-like =

Protein-coding gene in the species Homo sapiens

WBP1L

Identifiers
- Aliases: WBP1L, C10orf26, OPA1L, OPAL1, WW domain binding protein 1-like, WW domain binding protein 1 like
- External IDs: OMIM: 611129; MGI: 107577; HomoloGene: 9839; GeneCards: WBP1L; OMA:WBP1L - orthologs

Gene location (Human)
Chr.	Chromosome 10 (human)
Band	10q24.32	Start	102,743,948 bp
Band	10q24.32	End	102,834,516 bp

Gene location (Mouse)
Chr.	Chromosome 19 (mouse)
Band	19 C3|19 38.97 cM	Start	46,587,523 bp
Band	19 C3|19 38.97 cM	End	46,645,828 bp
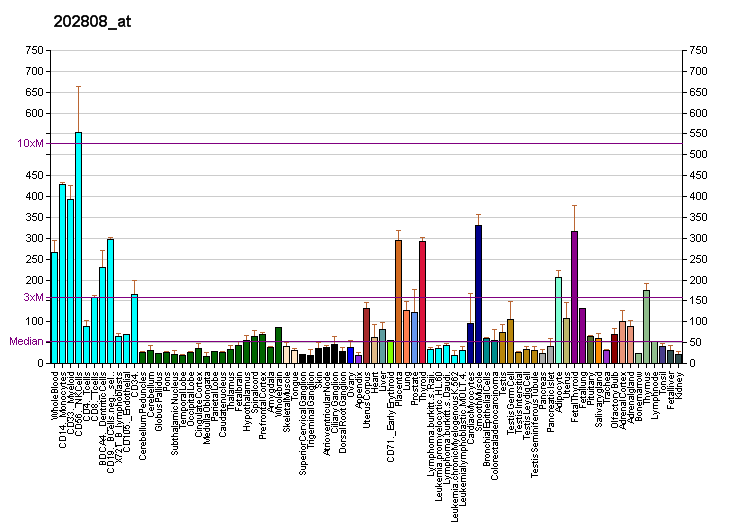
RNA expression pattern
Bgee	Human / Mouse (ortholog); Top expressed in: tendon of biceps brachii; right adrenal cortex; left adrenal cortex; decidua; pericardium; amniotic fluid; internal globus pallidus; periodontal fiber; skin of hip; skin of thigh / Top expressed in: Ileal epithelium; muscle of thigh; gastrula; plantaris muscle; otic vesicle; left lobe of liver; lactiferous gland; extensor digitorum longus muscle; granulocyte; saccule; More reference expression data
BioGPS	More reference expression data
Orthologs
Species	Human	Mouse
Entrez	54838	226178
Ensembl	ENSG00000166272	ENSMUSG00000047731
UniProt	Q9NX94	Q8BGW2
RefSeq (mRNA)	NM_001083913; NM_017787	NM_001177812; NM_001177813; NM_146099
RefSeq (protein)	NP_001077382; NP_060257	NP_001171283; NP_001171284; NP_666211
Location (UCSC)	Chr 10: 102.74 – 102.83 Mb	Chr 19: 46.59 – 46.65 Mb
PubMed search
- Wikidata
View/Edit Human	View/Edit Mouse

WW domain binding protein 1-like (WBP1L) also known as outcome predictor in acute leukemia 1 (OPA1L) is a protein that in humans is encoded by the WBP1L gene.
