= Shootin 1 =

Protein-coding gene in the species Homo sapiens

SHTN1

Identifiers
- Aliases: SHTN1, KIAA1598, shootin 1, shootin-1
- External IDs: OMIM: 611171; MGI: 1918903; HomoloGene: 41249; GeneCards: SHTN1; OMA:SHTN1 - orthologs

Gene location (Human)
Chr.	Chromosome 10 (human)
Band	10q25.3	Start	116,881,477 bp
Band	10q25.3	End	117,126,586 bp

Gene location (Mouse)
Chr.	Chromosome 19 (mouse)
Band	19|19 D2- D3	Start	58,961,788 bp
Band	19|19 D2- D3	End	59,064,532 bp
RNA expression pattern
Bgee	Human / Mouse (ortholog); Top expressed in: internal globus pallidus; inferior ganglion of vagus nerve; subthalamic nucleus; optic nerve; corpus callosum; external globus pallidus; pars reticulata; endothelial cell; C1 segment; medulla oblongata / Top expressed in: otolith organ; utricle; Rostral migratory stream; vestibular sensory epithelium; stroma of bone marrow; suprachiasmatic nucleus; trigeminal ganglion; lacrimal gland; epithelium of stomach; molar; More reference expression data
BioGPS	n/a
Gene ontology
Molecular function	actin filament binding; protein binding; cadherin binding; kinesin binding
Cellular component	perikaryon; cell projection; filopodium; growth cone; axon; cytoskeleton; lamellipodium; cytoplasm; microtubule; microtubule associated complex; microtubule cytoskeleton; cell leading edge; axonal growth cone; perinuclear region of cytoplasm
Biological process	Cdc42 protein signal transduction; cytoplasmic actin-based contraction involved in cell motility; axonogenesis; netrin-activated signaling pathway; substrate-dependent cell migration, cell extension; actin filament bundle retrograde transport; multicellular organism development; Ras protein signal transduction; positive regulation of axon extension; neuron projection morphogenesis; endoplasmic reticulum polarization; regulation of establishment of cell polarity; regulation of neuron migration; positive regulation of neuron migration
Sources:Amigo / QuickGO
Orthologs
Species	Human	Mouse
Entrez	57698	71653
Ensembl	ENSG00000187164	ENSMUSG00000041362
UniProt	A0MZ66	Q8K2Q9
RefSeq (mRNA)	NM_001127211; NM_001258298; NM_001258299; NM_001258300; NM_018330	NM_001114312; NM_175172
RefSeq (protein)	NP_001120683; NP_001245227; NP_001245228; NP_001245229; NP_060800	NP_001107784; NP_780381
Location (UCSC)	Chr 10: 116.88 – 117.13 Mb	Chr 19: 58.96 – 59.06 Mb
PubMed search
- Wikidata
View/Edit Human	View/Edit Mouse

Shootin 1 is a protein that is encoded in humans by the SHTN1 gene.
