= EBLN1 =

Protein-coding gene in humans

Identifiers
- Aliases: EBLN1, EBLN-1, endogenous Bornavirus-like nucleoprotein 1, endogenous Bornavirus like nucleoprotein 1
- External IDs: OMIM: 613249; MGI: 5592558; HomoloGene: 53479; GeneCards: EBLN1; OMA:EBLN1 - orthologs

Gene location (Human)
Chr.	Chromosome 10 (human)
Band	10p12.31	Start	22,208,475 bp
Band	10p12.31	End	22,218,015 bp
RNA expression pattern
Bgee	Human / Mouse (ortholog); Top expressed in: gonad; testicle; right testis; left testis; substantia nigra / n/a; More reference expression data
BioGPS	n/a
Orthologs
Species	Human	Mouse
Entrez	340900	102636291
Ensembl	ENSG00000223601	n/a
UniProt	P0CF75	n/a
RefSeq (mRNA)	NM_001199938; NM_001394757	XM_006534643; XM_006542924
RefSeq (protein)	NP_001186867	n/a
Location (UCSC)	Chr 10: 22.21 – 22.22 Mb	n/a
PubMed search
- Wikidata
View/Edit Human	View/Edit Mouse

Endogenous Bornavirus-like nucleoprotein 1 is a protein that in humans is encoded by the EBLN1 gene.
