= FAS-AS1 =

Non-coding RNA in the species Homo sapiens

Identifiers
- Aliases: FAS-AS1, FAS-AS, FASAS, SAF, FAS antisense RNA 1
- External IDs: GeneCards: FAS-AS1
Orthologs
Databases	NCBI: entry; OMA: entry
Species	Human	Mouse
Entrez	100302740	n/a
Ensembl	ENSG00000275689; ENSG00000275693	n/a
UniProt	n a	n/a
RefSeq (mRNA)	n/a	n/a
RefSeq (protein)	n/a	n/a
Location (UCSC)	n/a	n/a
PubMed search		n/a
- Wikidata
View/Edit Human

In molecular biology, FAS antisense RNA (non-protein coding), also known as FAS-AS1 or SAF, is a long non-coding RNA. In humans it is located on chromosome 10. In humans it is transcribed from the opposite strand of intron 1 of the FAS gene. It may regulate the expression of some isoforms of FAS. It may also play a role in the regulation of FAS-mediated apoptosis. Recently it has been shown be sehgal et al. that the alternative splicing of Fas in lymphomas is tightly regulated by a long-noncoding RNA corresponding to an antisense transcript of Fas (FAS-AS1). Levels of FAS-AS1 correlate inversely with production of sFas, and FAS-AS1 binding to the RBM5 inhibits RBM5-mediated exon 6 skipping. EZH2, often mutated or overexpressed in lymphomas, hyper-methylates the FAS-AS1 promoter and represses the FAS-AS1 expression. EZH2-mediated repression of FAS-AS1 promoter can be released by DZNeP (3-Deazaneplanocin A) or overcome by ectopic expression of FAS-AS1, both of which increase levels of FAS-AS1 and correspondingly decrease expression of sFas. Treatment with Bruton's tyrosine kinase inhibitor or EZH2 knockdown decreases the levels of EZH2, RBM5 and sFas, thereby enhancing Fas-mediated apoptosis. This is the first report showing functional regulation of Fas repression by its antisense RNA. Our results reveal new therapeutic targets in lymphomas and provide a rationale for the use of EZH2 inhibitors or ibrutinib in combination with chemotherapeutic agents that recruit Fas for effective cell killing.

== See also ==
- Long noncoding RNA
