= CDC123 =

Protein-coding gene in humans

Identifiers
- Aliases: CDC123, C10orf7, D123, cell division cycle 123
- External IDs: OMIM: 617708; MGI: 2138811; HomoloGene: 4394; GeneCards: CDC123; OMA:CDC123 - orthologs

Gene location (Human)
Chr.	Chromosome 10 (human)
Band	10p14-p13	Start	12,195,965 bp
Band	10p14-p13	End	12,250,589 bp

Gene location (Mouse)
Chr.	Chromosome 2 (mouse)
Band	2|2 A1	Start	5,799,105 bp
Band	2|2 A1	End	5,849,975 bp
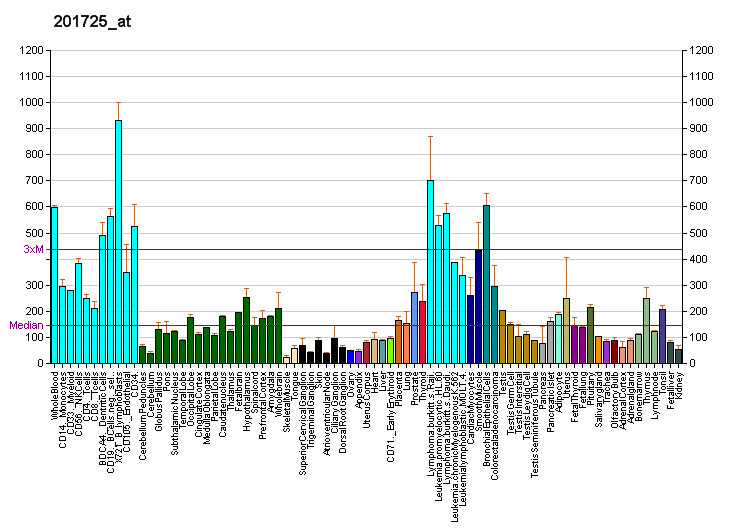
RNA expression pattern
Bgee	Human / Mouse (ortholog); Top expressed in: rectum; secondary oocyte; islet of Langerhans; smooth muscle tissue; ventricular zone; embryo; ganglionic eminence; right auricle of heart; monocyte; mucosa of transverse colon / Top expressed in: ventricular zone; neural layer of retina; medial ganglionic eminence; genital tubercle; neural tube; tail of embryo; otic vesicle; superior frontal gyrus; epiblast; mandibular prominence; More reference expression data
BioGPS	More reference expression data
Orthologs
Species	Human	Mouse
Entrez	8872	98828
Ensembl	ENSG00000151465	ENSMUSG00000039128
UniProt	O75794	Q8CII2
RefSeq (mRNA)	NM_006023	NM_133837; NM_001356501; NM_001356502; NM_001356503; NM_001356504
RefSeq (protein)	NP_006014	NP_598598; NP_001343430; NP_001343431; NP_001343432; NP_001343433
Location (UCSC)	Chr 10: 12.2 – 12.25 Mb	Chr 2: 5.8 – 5.85 Mb
PubMed search
- Wikidata
View/Edit Human	View/Edit Mouse

Cell division cycle protein 123 homolog is a protein that in humans is encoded by the CDC123 gene.
