= STOX1 =

Protein-coding gene in the species Homo sapiens

Identifiers
- Aliases: STOX1, C10orf24, PEE4, storkhead box 1
- External IDs: OMIM: 609397; MGI: 2684909; HomoloGene: 17649; GeneCards: STOX1; OMA:STOX1 - orthologs

Gene location (Human)
Chr.	Chromosome 10 (human)
Band	10q22.1	Start	68,827,531 bp
Band	10q22.1	End	68,895,432 bp

Gene location (Mouse)
Chr.	Chromosome 10 (mouse)
Band	10|10 B4	Start	62,494,822 bp
Band	10|10 B4	End	62,561,907 bp
RNA expression pattern
Bgee	Human / Mouse (ortholog); Top expressed in: bronchial epithelial cell; ventricular zone; amygdala; gonad; mucosa of paranasal sinus; endothelial cell; cingulate gyrus; anterior cingulate cortex; nucleus accumbens; olfactory zone of nasal mucosa / Top expressed in: spermatocyte; otolith organ; morula; utricle; islet of Langerhans; vestibular sensory epithelium; olfactory epithelium; retinal pigment epithelium; embryo; embryo; More reference expression data
BioGPS	n/a
Gene ontology
Molecular function	DNA binding; RNA polymerase II transcription regulatory region sequence-specific DNA binding; protein binding
Cellular component	cytoplasm; centrosome; nucleoplasm; microtubule organizing center; cell cortex; cytoskeleton; nucleus; fibrillar center; nucleolus; cytosol
Biological process	positive regulation of protein kinase B signaling; regulation of transcription, DNA-templated; regulation of mitochondrion organization; regulation of mitochondrial DNA metabolic process; positive regulation of epithelial cell proliferation; negative regulation of gene expression; transcription, DNA-templated; positive regulation of peptidyl-serine phosphorylation; positive regulation of cyclin-dependent protein kinase activity; cell division; regulation of mitochondrial membrane potential; positive regulation of gene expression; positive regulation of cell cycle; positive regulation of peptidyl-threonine phosphorylation; positive regulation of cell population proliferation; regulation of transcription from RNA polymerase II promoter in response to hypoxia; regulation of response to oxidative stress; regulation of gene expression; inner ear development; positive regulation of G2/M transition of mitotic cell cycle; cell cycle; cellular response to nitrosative stress; positive regulation of otic vesicle morphogenesis; regulation of transcription by RNA polymerase II
Sources:Amigo / QuickGO
Orthologs
Species	Human	Mouse
Entrez	219736	216021
Ensembl	ENSG00000165730	ENSMUSG00000036923
UniProt	Q6ZVD7	B2RQL2
RefSeq (mRNA)	NM_001130159; NM_001130160; NM_001130161; NM_001130162; NM_152709	NM_001033260; NM_001364705
RefSeq (protein)	NP_001123631; NP_001123632; NP_001123633; NP_689922	NP_001028432; NP_001351634
Location (UCSC)	Chr 10: 68.83 – 68.9 Mb	Chr 10: 62.49 – 62.56 Mb
PubMed search
- Wikidata
View/Edit Human	View/Edit Mouse

Storkhead box 1 is a protein in humans that is encoded by the STOX1 gene.

The protein encoded by this gene may function as a DNA binding protein. Mutations in this gene are associated with pre-eclampsia/eclampsia 4 (PEE4). Alternatively spliced transcript variants encoding different isoforms have been found for this gene. [provided by RefSeq, Sep 2009].
