= AS3MT =

Protein-coding gene in humans

Identifiers
- Aliases: AS3MT, CYT19, arsenite methyltransferase
- External IDs: OMIM: 611806; MGI: 1929882; GeneCards: AS3MT
Enzyme activity
EC #	BRENDA	ExPASy	KEGG	MetaCyc
2.1.1.137	↗	↗	↗	↗

Gene location (Human)
Chr.	Chromosome 10 (human)
Band	10q24.32	Start	102,869,470 bp
Band	10q24.32	End	102,901,899 bp

Gene location (Mouse)
Chr.	Chromosome 19 (mouse)
Band	19|19 C3	Start	46,695,897 bp
Band	19|19 C3	End	46,729,538 bp
RNA expression pattern
Bgee	Human / Mouse (ortholog); Top expressed in: right adrenal gland; right adrenal cortex; left adrenal cortex; right lobe of liver; apex of heart; left ventricle; ganglionic eminence; ventricular zone; right auricle of heart; spleen / Top expressed in: yolk sac; right kidney; soleus muscle; proximal tubule; interventricular septum; median eminence; arcuate nucleus; myocardium of ventricle; neural layer of retina; Paneth cell; More reference expression data
BioGPS	n/a
Gene ontology
Molecular function	methyltransferase activity; transferase activity; methylarsonite methyltransferase activity; arsenite methyltransferase activity
Cellular component	cytosol; cytoplasm
Biological process	toxin metabolic process; arsonoacetate metabolic process; methylation
Sources:Amigo / QuickGO
Orthologs
Databases	NCBI: entry; OMA: entry
Species	Human	Mouse
Entrez	57412	57344
Ensembl	ENSG00000214435	ENSMUSG00000003559
UniProt	Q9HBK9	Q91WU5
RefSeq (mRNA)	NM_020682	NM_020577
RefSeq (protein)	NP_065733	NP_065602
Location (UCSC)	Chr 10: 102.87 – 102.9 Mb	Chr 19: 46.7 – 46.73 Mb
PubMed search
- Wikidata
View/Edit Human	View/Edit Mouse

Arsenite methyltransferase is an enzyme that in humans is encoded by the AS3MT gene.
