= TMEM26 =

Protein-coding gene in the species Homo sapiens

Identifiers
- Aliases: TMEM26, transmembrane protein 26
- External IDs: OMIM: 617803; MGI: 2143537; HomoloGene: 14428; GeneCards: TMEM26; OMA:TMEM26 - orthologs

Gene location (Human)
Chr.	Chromosome 10 (human)
Band	10q21.2	Start	61,406,642 bp
Band	10q21.2	End	61,453,381 bp

Gene location (Mouse)
Chr.	Chromosome 10 (mouse)
Band	10|10 B5.3	Start	68,559,476 bp
Band	10|10 B5.3	End	68,618,480 bp
RNA expression pattern
Bgee	Human / Mouse (ortholog); Top expressed in: testicle; stromal cell of endometrium; spleen; smooth muscle tissue; rectum; gallbladder; epithelium of colon; appendix; human kidney; canal of the cervix / Top expressed in: hand; vas deferens; dermis; internal carotid artery; efferent ductule; maxillary prominence; upper lip; ascending aorta; renal corpuscle; human fetus; More reference expression data
BioGPS	n/a
Orthologs
Species	Human	Mouse
Entrez	219623	327766
Ensembl	ENSG00000196932	ENSMUSG00000060044
UniProt	Q6ZUK4	Q3UP23
RefSeq (mRNA)	NM_178505	NM_177794
RefSeq (protein)	NP_848600	NP_808462
Location (UCSC)	Chr 10: 61.41 – 61.45 Mb	Chr 10: 68.56 – 68.62 Mb
PubMed search
- Wikidata
View/Edit Human	View/Edit Mouse

Transmembrane protein 26 is a protein that in humans is encoded by the TMEM26 gene.
