= TMEM72 =

Protein-coding gene in the species Homo sapiens

Identifiers
- Aliases: TMEM72, C10orf127, KSP37, bA285G1.3, transmembrane protein 72
- External IDs: MGI: 2442707; HomoloGene: 18704; GeneCards: TMEM72; OMA:TMEM72 - orthologs

Gene location (Human)
Chr.	Chromosome 10 (human)
Band	10q11.21	Start	44,911,316 bp
Band	10q11.21	End	44,937,010 bp

Gene location (Mouse)
Chr.	Chromosome 6 (mouse)
Band	6|6 E3	Start	116,656,024 bp
Band	6|6 E3	End	116,693,874 bp
RNA expression pattern
Bgee	Human / Mouse (ortholog); Top expressed in: renal medulla; human kidney; nasal epithelium; retinal pigment epithelium; sperm; mucosa of transverse colon; cerebellar vermis; subthalamic nucleus; vena cava; rectum / Top expressed in: zygote; right kidney; vestibular membrane of cochlear duct; secondary oocyte; retinal pigment epithelium; spinal ganglia; primary oocyte; Epithelium of choroid plexus; human kidney; choroid plexus of fourth ventricle; More reference expression data
BioGPS	n/a
Orthologs
Species	Human	Mouse
Entrez	643236	319776
Ensembl	ENSG00000187783	ENSMUSG00000048108
UniProt	A0PK05	Q8C3K5
RefSeq (mRNA)	NM_001123376; NM_001345926	NM_178768
RefSeq (protein)	NP_001116848; NP_001332855	NP_848883
Location (UCSC)	Chr 10: 44.91 – 44.94 Mb	Chr 6: 116.66 – 116.69 Mb
PubMed search
- Wikidata
View/Edit Human	View/Edit Mouse

Transmembrane protein 72 is a protein that in humans is encoded by the TMEM72 gene.
