= GTPBP4 =

Protein-coding gene in the species Homo sapiens

Identifiers
- Aliases: GTPBP4, CRFG, NGB, NOG1, GTP binding protein 4
- External IDs: MGI: 1916487; HomoloGene: 7100; GeneCards: GTPBP4; OMA:GTPBP4 - orthologs

Gene location (Human)
Chr.	Chromosome 10 (human)
Band	10p15.3	Start	988,434 bp
Band	10p15.3	End	1,019,932 bp

Gene location (Mouse)
Chr.	Chromosome 13 (mouse)
Band	13|13 A1	Start	9,016,367 bp
Band	13|13 A1	End	9,046,119 bp
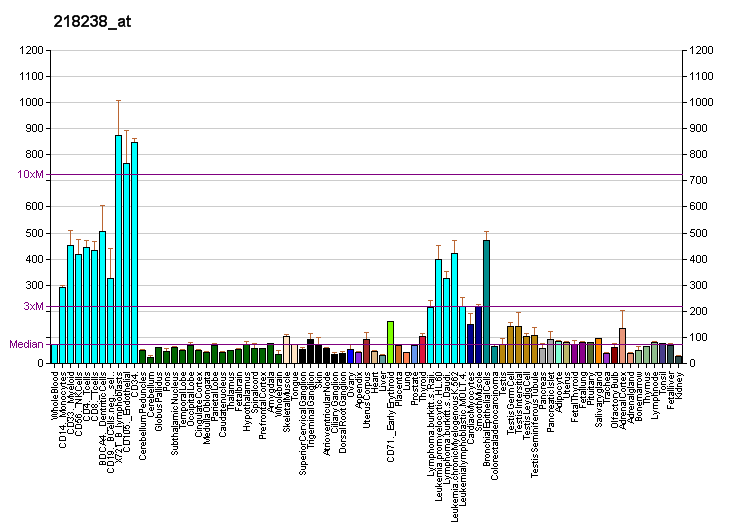

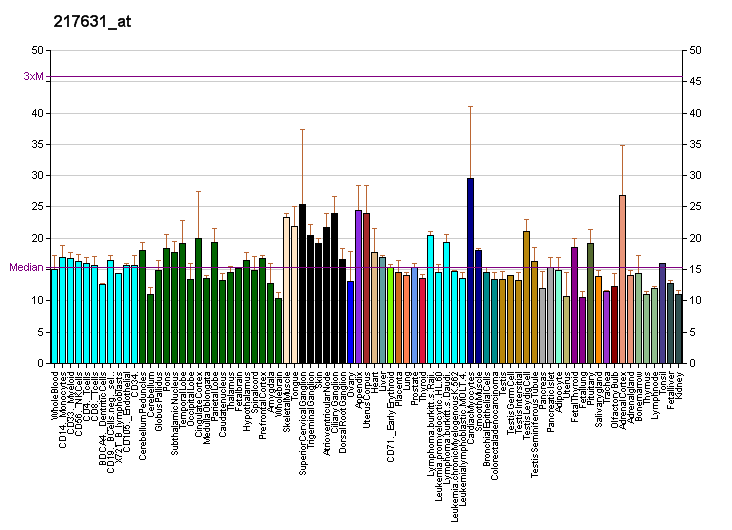

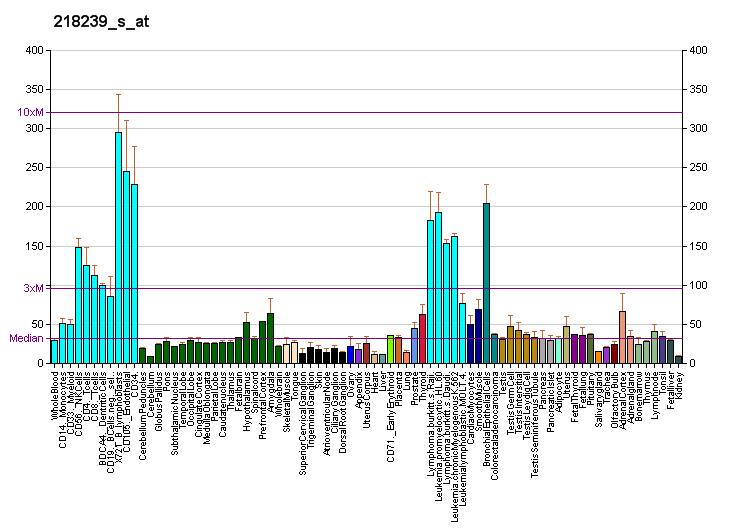
RNA expression pattern
Bgee	Human / Mouse (ortholog); Top expressed in: sperm; epithelium of nasopharynx; Achilles tendon; mucosa of urinary bladder; amniotic fluid; cartilage tissue; stromal cell of endometrium; Skeletal muscle tissue of rectus abdominis; right adrenal cortex; gastrocnemius muscle / Top expressed in: otic placode; saccule; otic vesicle; morula; morula; epiblast; embryo; blastocyst; Ileal epithelium; primitive streak; More reference expression data
BioGPS	More reference expression data
Gene ontology
Molecular function	nucleotide binding; GTP binding; protein binding; GTPase activity; RNA binding
Cellular component	cytoplasm; Golgi apparatus; nuclear membrane; membrane; nucleolus; perinuclear region of cytoplasm; nucleus; cytosol
Biological process	regulation of cyclin-dependent protein serine/threonine kinase activity; ribosome biogenesis; negative regulation of cell-cell adhesion; protein stabilization; negative regulation of DNA replication; negative regulation of protein ubiquitination; negative regulation of cell migration; osteoblast differentiation; negative regulation of collagen binding; negative regulation of cell population proliferation; maturation of LSU-rRNA from tricistronic rRNA transcript (SSU-rRNA, 5.8S rRNA, LSU-rRNA)
Sources:Amigo / QuickGO
Orthologs
Species	Human	Mouse
Entrez	23560	69237
Ensembl	ENSG00000107937	ENSMUSG00000021149
UniProt	Q9BZE4	Q99ME9
RefSeq (mRNA)	NM_012341	NM_027000
RefSeq (protein)	NP_036473	NP_081276
Location (UCSC)	Chr 10: 0.99 – 1.02 Mb	Chr 13: 9.02 – 9.05 Mb
PubMed search
- Wikidata
View/Edit Human	View/Edit Mouse

Nucleolar GTP-binding protein 1 is a protein that in humans is encoded by the GTPBP4 gene.

GTPases function as molecular switches that can flip between two states: active, when GTP is bound, and inactive, when GDP is bound. 'Active' usually means that the molecule acts as a signal to trigger other events in the cell. When an extracellular ligand binds to a G protein-coupled receptor, the receptor changes its conformation and switches on the trimeric G proteins that associate with it by causing them to eject their GDP and replace it with GTP. The switch is turned off when the G protein hydrolyzes its own bound GTP, converting it back to GDP. But before that occurs, the active protein has an opportunity to diffuse away from the receptor and deliver its message for a prolonged period to its downstream target.
