= CCDC3 =

Protein-coding gene in humans

Identifiers
- Aliases: CCDC3, coiled-coil domain containing 3
- External IDs: MGI: 1921436; HomoloGene: 12870; GeneCards: CCDC3; OMA:CCDC3 - orthologs

Gene location (Human)
Chr.	Chromosome 10 (human)
Band	10p13	Start	12,896,625 bp
Band	10p13	End	13,099,652 bp

Gene location (Mouse)
Chr.	Chromosome 2 (mouse)
Band	2|2 A1	Start	5,142,587 bp
Band	2|2 A1	End	5,235,689 bp
RNA expression pattern
Bgee	Human / Mouse (ortholog); Top expressed in: saphenous vein; right coronary artery; skin of arm; vena cava; pericardium; left coronary artery; urethra; popliteal artery; tibial arteries; Descending thoracic aorta / Top expressed in: ankle; sciatic nerve; aorta; conjunctival fornix; internal carotid artery; external carotid artery; brown adipose tissue; aortic valve; ascending aorta; zygote; More reference expression data
BioGPS	n/a
Orthologs
Species	Human	Mouse
Entrez	83643	74186
Ensembl	ENSG00000151468	ENSMUSG00000026676
UniProt	Q9BQI4	Q9D6Y1
RefSeq (mRNA)	NM_031455; NM_001282658	NM_028804
RefSeq (protein)	NP_001269587; NP_113643	NP_083080
Location (UCSC)	Chr 10: 12.9 – 13.1 Mb	Chr 2: 5.14 – 5.24 Mb
PubMed search
- Wikidata
View/Edit Human	View/Edit Mouse

Coiled-coil domain-containing protein 3 is a protein that in humans is encoded by the CCDC3 gene.
