= UTF1 =

Protein-coding gene in the species Homo sapiens

Identifiers
- Aliases: UTF1, undifferentiated embryonic cell transcription factor 1
- External IDs: OMIM: 604130; MGI: 1276125; HomoloGene: 48226; GeneCards: UTF1; OMA:UTF1 - orthologs

Gene location (Human)
Chr.	Chromosome 10 (human)
Band	10q26.3	Start	133,230,217 bp
Band	10q26.3	End	133,231,558 bp

Gene location (Mouse)
Chr.	Chromosome 7 (mouse)
Band	7|7 F4	Start	139,523,702 bp
Band	7|7 F4	End	139,525,025 bp
RNA expression pattern
Bgee	Human / Mouse (ortholog); Top expressed in: gonad; testicle; right testis; left testis; granulocyte; monocyte; skin of thigh; right uterine tube; blood; ovary / Top expressed in: embryo; epiblast; Gonadal ridge; chorion; blastocyst; embryo; morula; yolk sac; placenta; inner cell mass; More reference expression data
BioGPS	n/a
Gene ontology
Molecular function	transcription coactivator activity; HMG box domain binding; protein binding
Cellular component	nucleus
Biological process	regulation of transcription by RNA polymerase II; male gonad development; regulation of transcription, DNA-templated; transcription, DNA-templated; positive regulation of transcription by RNA polymerase II
Sources:Amigo / QuickGO
Orthologs
Species	Human	Mouse
Entrez	8433	22286
Ensembl	ENSG00000171794	ENSMUSG00000047751
UniProt	Q5T230	Q6J1H4
RefSeq (mRNA)	NM_003577	NM_009482
RefSeq (protein)	NP_003568	NP_033508
Location (UCSC)	Chr 10: 133.23 – 133.23 Mb	Chr 7: 139.52 – 139.53 Mb
PubMed search
- Wikidata
View/Edit Human	View/Edit Mouse

Undifferentiated embryonic cell transcription factor 1 is a protein in humans that is encoded by the UTF1 gene. UTF1, first reported in 1998, is expressed in pluripotent cells including embryonic stem cells and embryonic carcinoma cells. Its expression is rapidly reduced upon differentiation. UTF1 protein is localized to the cell nucleus, where it functions to regulate the pluripotent chromatin state and buffer mRNA levels by promoting degradation of mRNA.

Aberrant expression of UTF1 has also been reported in cervical cancer cells, where the UTF1 gene promoter loses methylation and becomes abnormally expressed compared to normal cervical cells.

In rat testis, UTF1 expression is limited to a subpopulation of early type A spermatogonia. Further, in adult human testis, UTF1 gene and protein expression has been shown to be restricted to the earliest state of spermatogonium.
