= RRP12 =

Protein-coding gene in the species Homo sapiens

Identifiers
- Aliases: RRP12, KIAA0690, ribosomal RNA processing 12 homolog
- External IDs: OMIM: 617723; MGI: 2147437; GeneCards: RRP12

Gene location (Human)
Chr.	Chromosome 10 (human)
Band	10q24.1	Start	97,356,358 bp
Band	10q24.1	End	97,426,076 bp

Gene location (Mouse)
Chr.	Chromosome 19 (mouse)
Band	19|19 C3	Start	41,851,290 bp
Band	19|19 C3	End	41,884,612 bp
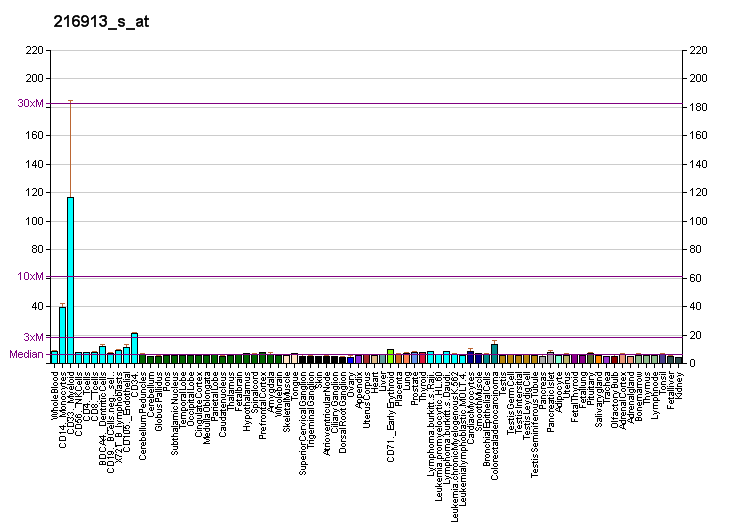

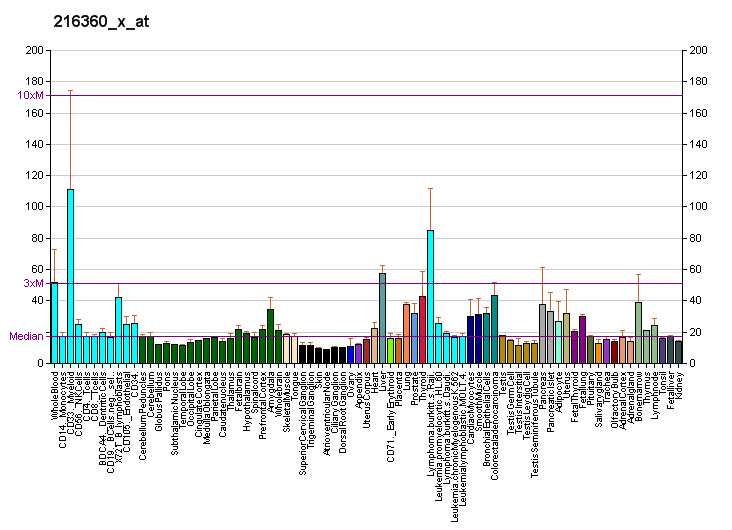
RNA expression pattern
Bgee	Human / Mouse (ortholog); Top expressed in: gastrocnemius muscle; monocyte; bone marrow cell; muscle of thigh; anterior pituitary; granulocyte; testicle; blood; body of pancreas; apex of heart / Top expressed in: otic placode; otic vesicle; saccule; muscle of thigh; epiblast; spermatid; primitive streak; seminiferous tubule; spermatocyte; yolk sac; More reference expression data
BioGPS	More reference expression data
Orthologs
Databases	NCBI: entry; OMA: entry
Species	Human	Mouse
Entrez	23223	107094
Ensembl	ENSG00000052749	ENSMUSG00000035049
UniProt	Q5JTH9	Q6P5B0
RefSeq (mRNA)	NM_001145114; NM_001284337; NM_015179	NM_199447
RefSeq (protein)	NP_001138586; NP_001271266; NP_055994	NP_955518
Location (UCSC)	Chr 10: 97.36 – 97.43 Mb	Chr 19: 41.85 – 41.88 Mb
PubMed search
- Wikidata
View/Edit Human	View/Edit Mouse

RRP12-like protein is a protein that in humans is encoded by the RRP12 gene. It is currently thought to be involved in ribosome assembly of the precursor particles of both subunits in eukaryotes and was identified as a RNA binding protein.
