= Disco interacting protein 2 homolog C =

Protein-coding gene in the species Homo sapiens

DIP2C

Identifiers
- Aliases: DIP2C, KIAA0934, disco interacting protein 2 homolog C
- External IDs: OMIM: 611380; MGI: 1920179; HomoloGene: 40996; GeneCards: DIP2C; OMA:DIP2C - orthologs

Gene location (Human)
Chr.	Chromosome 10 (human)
Band	10p15.3	Start	274,190 bp
Band	10p15.3	End	689,668 bp

Gene location (Mouse)
Chr.	Chromosome 13 (mouse)
Band	13|13 A1	Start	9,326,564 bp
Band	13|13 A1	End	9,718,964 bp
RNA expression pattern
Bgee	Human / Mouse (ortholog); Top expressed in: cartilage tissue; middle frontal gyrus; paraflocculus of cerebellum; tibia; middle temporal gyrus; saphenous vein; quadriceps femoris muscle; vastus lateralis muscle; endothelial cell; Region I of hippocampus proper / Top expressed in: lateral septal nucleus; facial motor nucleus; pontine nuclei; olfactory tubercle; amygdala; nucleus accumbens; superior cervical ganglion; substantia nigra; medial vestibular nucleus; anterior horn of spinal cord; More reference expression data
BioGPS	n/a
Gene ontology
Molecular function	catalytic activity; molecular function
Cellular component	cellular component
Biological process	metabolism; biological process
Sources:Amigo / QuickGO
Orthologs
Species	Human	Mouse
Entrez	22982	208440
Ensembl	ENSG00000151240	ENSMUSG00000048264
UniProt	Q9Y2E4	n/a
RefSeq (mRNA)	NM_014974	NM_001081426; NM_172459
RefSeq (protein)	NP_055789	n/a
Location (UCSC)	Chr 10: 0.27 – 0.69 Mb	Chr 13: 9.33 – 9.72 Mb
PubMed search
- Wikidata
View/Edit Human	View/Edit Mouse

Disco interacting protein 2 homolog C is a protein that in humans is encoded by the DIP2C gene.

== Function ==
This gene encodes a member of the disco-interacting protein homolog 2 family. The protein shares strong similarity with a Drosophila protein which interacts with the transcription factor disco and is expressed in the nervous system. [provided by RefSeq, Oct 2008].
