= AVPI1 =

Protein-coding gene in the species Homo sapiens

Identifiers
- Aliases: AVPI1, PP5395, VIP32, VIT32, arginine vasopressin induced 1
- External IDs: OMIM: 618537; MGI: 1916784; HomoloGene: 11027; GeneCards: AVPI1; OMA:AVPI1 - orthologs

Gene location (Human)
Chr.	Chromosome 10 (human)
Band	10q24.2	Start	97,677,424 bp
Band	10q24.2	End	97,687,241 bp

Gene location (Mouse)
Chr.	Chromosome 19 (mouse)
Band	19|19 C3	Start	42,111,712 bp
Band	19|19 C3	End	42,117,498 bp
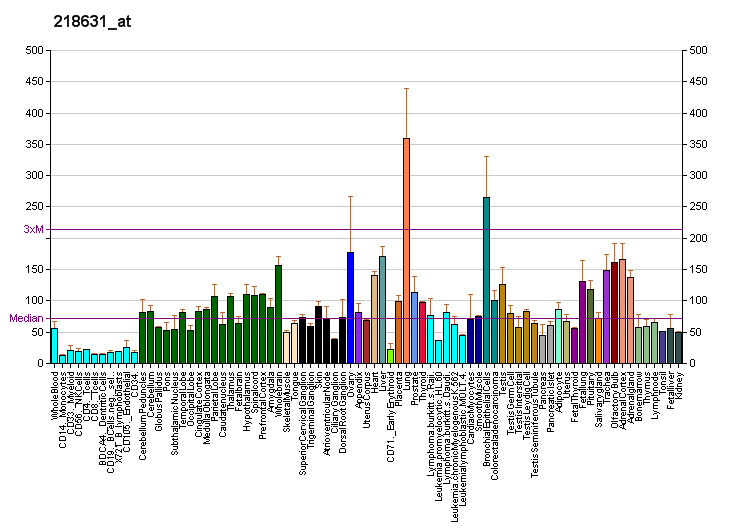
RNA expression pattern
Bgee	Human / Mouse (ortholog); Top expressed in: gastric mucosa; skin of leg; skin of abdomen; tibial nerve; parotid gland; amniotic fluid; mucosa of paranasal sinus; popliteal artery; tibial arteries; left ovary / Top expressed in: lip; esophagus; skin of external ear; yolk sac; left lobe of liver; right lung lobe; hair follicle; right kidney; stomach; epithelium of stomach; More reference expression data
BioGPS	More reference expression data
Orthologs
Species	Human	Mouse
Entrez	60370	69534
Ensembl	ENSG00000119986	ENSMUSG00000018821
UniProt	Q5T686	Q9D7H4
RefSeq (mRNA)	NM_021732	NM_027106
RefSeq (protein)	NP_068378	NP_081382
Location (UCSC)	Chr 10: 97.68 – 97.69 Mb	Chr 19: 42.11 – 42.12 Mb
PubMed search
- Wikidata
View/Edit Human	View/Edit Mouse

Arginine vasopressin-induced protein 1 is a protein that in humans is encoded by the AVPI1 gene.
