= Zinc finger protein 438 =

Protein found in humans

ZNF438

Identifiers
- Aliases: ZNF438, bA330O11.1, zinc finger protein 438
- External IDs: MGI: 2444919; GeneCards: ZNF438

Gene location (Human)
Chr.	Chromosome 10 (human)
Band	10p11.23	Start	30,820,207 bp
Band	10p11.23	End	31,031,937 bp

Gene location (Mouse)
Chr.	Chromosome 18 (mouse)
Band	18|18 A1	Start	5,210,029 bp
Band	18|18 A1	End	5,334,807 bp
RNA expression pattern
Bgee	Human / Mouse (ortholog); Top expressed in: tibialis anterior muscle; monocyte; deltoid muscle; Achilles tendon; gonad; gastrocnemius muscle; testicle; tendon of biceps brachii; muscle of thigh; secondary oocyte / Top expressed in: spermatid; seminiferous tubule; primary oocyte; spermatocyte; secondary oocyte; substantia nigra; epithelium of lens; zygote; otolith organ; utricle; More reference expression data
BioGPS	n/a
Gene ontology
Molecular function	DNA-binding transcription factor activity; DNA binding; metal ion binding; nucleic acid binding; DNA-binding transcription factor activity, RNA polymerase II-specific; sequence-specific DNA binding
Cellular component	nucleus; nucleoplasm; cytosol
Biological process	negative regulation of transcription, DNA-templated; regulation of transcription, DNA-templated; transcription, DNA-templated; regulation of transcription by RNA polymerase II; positive regulation of transcription, DNA-templated; positive regulation of transcription by RNA polymerase II
Sources:Amigo / QuickGO
Orthologs
Databases	NCBI: entry; OMA: entry
Species	Human	Mouse
Entrez	220929	240186
Ensembl	ENSG00000183621	ENSMUSG00000050945
UniProt	Q7Z4V0	n/a
RefSeq (mRNA)	NM_001143766; NM_001143767; NM_001143768; NM_001143769; NM_001143770 NM_001143771; NM_182755; NM_001387405; NM_001387411; NM_001387412	NM_178722; NM_001360447
RefSeq (protein)	NP_001137238; NP_001137239; NP_001137240; NP_001137241; NP_001137242 NP_001137243; NP_877432	n/a
Location (UCSC)	Chr 10: 30.82 – 31.03 Mb	Chr 18: 5.21 – 5.33 Mb
PubMed search
- Wikidata
View/Edit Human	View/Edit Mouse

Zinc finger protein 438 is a protein that in humans is encoded by the ZNF438 gene.
