= Pleckstrin homology domain containing S1 =

Protein-coding gene in the species Homo sapiens

PLEKHS1

Identifiers
- Aliases: PLEKHS1, C10orf81, HEL185, bA211N11.2, pleckstrin homology domain containing S1
- External IDs: MGI: 2443041; GeneCards: PLEKHS1

Gene location (Human)
| Chr. | Chromosome 10 (human) |
| Band | 10q25.3 | Start | 113,751,262 bp |
| Band | 10q25.3 | End | 113,783,429 bp |

Gene location (Mouse)
| Chr. | Chromosome 19 (mouse) |
| Band | 19|19 D2 | Start | 56,450,072 bp |
| Band | 19|19 D2 | End | 56,475,184 bp |
RNA expression pattern
| Bgee | Human / Mouse (ortholog); Top expressed in: olfactory zone of nasal mucosa; bronchial epithelial cell; mucosa of paranasal sinus; body of pancreas; nasal epithelium; minor salivary glands; right uterine tube; palpebral conjunctiva; epithelium of nasopharynx; trachea / Top expressed in: seminal vesicula; uterus; conjunctival fornix; hematopoietic cell; lens; granulocyte; embryo; cornea; embryo; zygote; More reference expression data |
| BioGPS | n/a |
Orthologs
| Databases | NCBI: entry; OMA: entry |
| Species | Human | Mouse |
| Entrez | 79949 | 226245 |
| Ensembl | ENSG00000148735 | ENSMUSG00000035818 |
| UniProt | Q5SXH7 | Q8BW88 |
| RefSeq (mRNA) | NM_001193434; NM_001193435; NM_024889; NM_182601; NM_001395068 | NM_001164263; NM_172641 |
| RefSeq (protein) | NP_001180363; NP_001180364; NP_079165; NP_872407 | NP_001157735; NP_766229 |
| Location (UCSC) | Chr 10: 113.75 – 113.78 Mb | Chr 19: 56.45 – 56.48 Mb |
| PubMed search |
- Wikidata
| View/Edit Human | View/Edit Mouse |

Pleckstrin homology domain containing S1 is a protein that in humans is encoded by the PLEKHS1 gene.
