= GPRIN2 =

Protein-coding gene in the species Homo sapiens

Identifiers
- Aliases: GPRIN2, GRIN2, KIAA0514, G protein regulated inducer of neurite outgrowth 2
- External IDs: OMIM: 611240; MGI: 2444560; HomoloGene: 40975; GeneCards: GPRIN2; OMA:GPRIN2 - orthologs

Gene location (Human)
Chr.	Chromosome 10 (human)
Band	10q11.22	Start	46,549,044 bp
Band	10q11.22	End	46,555,530 bp

Gene location (Mouse)
Chr.	Chromosome 14 (mouse)
Band	14|14 B	Start	33,907,645 bp
Band	14|14 B	End	33,923,610 bp
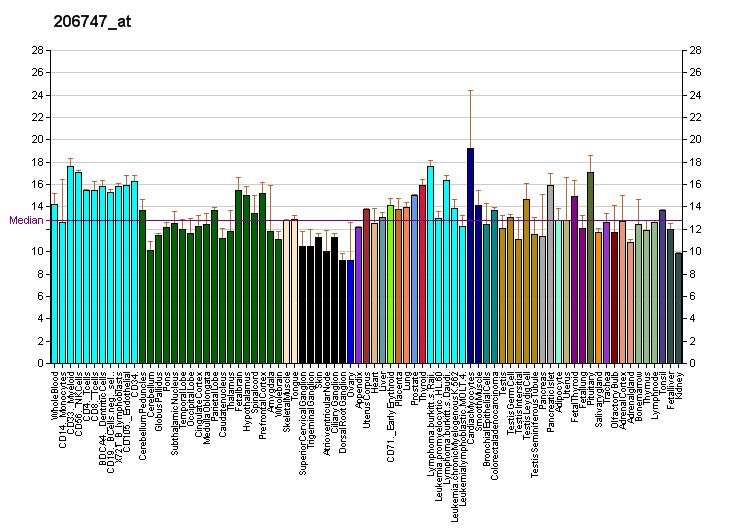
RNA expression pattern
Bgee	Human / Mouse (ortholog); Top expressed in: upper lobe of left lung; skin of leg; skin of abdomen; right lung; mucosa of transverse colon; rectum; body of pancreas; hypothalamus; cerebellar cortex; cerebellar hemisphere / Top expressed in: substantia nigra; fossa; condyle; trigeminal ganglion; lumbar spinal ganglion; facial motor nucleus; umbilical cord; supraoptic nucleus; sexually immature organism; skin of external ear; More reference expression data
BioGPS	More reference expression data
Orthologs
Species	Human	Mouse
Entrez	9721	432839
Ensembl	ENSG00000204175	ENSMUSG00000071531
UniProt	O60269	D3Z1D7
RefSeq (mRNA)	NM_014696	NM_183209
RefSeq (protein)	NP_055511	NP_899032
Location (UCSC)	Chr 10: 46.55 – 46.56 Mb	Chr 14: 33.91 – 33.92 Mb
PubMed search
- Wikidata
View/Edit Human	View/Edit Mouse

G protein-regulated inducer of neurite outgrowth 2 is a protein that in humans is encoded by the GPRIN2 gene.
