= RTKN2 =

Protein-coding gene in the species Homo sapiens

Identifiers
- Aliases: RTKN2, PLEKHK1, bA531F24.1, rhotekin 2
- External IDs: OMIM: 618450; MGI: 2158417; GeneCards: RTKN2

Gene location (Human)
Chr.	Chromosome 10 (human)
Band	10q21.2	Start	62,183,035 bp
Band	10q21.2	End	62,268,844 bp

Gene location (Mouse)
Chr.	Chromosome 10 (mouse)
Band	10|10 B5.1	Start	67,815,400 bp
Band	10|10 B5.1	End	67,895,570 bp
RNA expression pattern
Bgee	Human / Mouse (ortholog); Top expressed in: right lung; ventricular zone; gonad; upper lobe of left lung; ganglionic eminence; testicle; lower lobe of lung; visceral pleura; lymph node; left testis / Top expressed in: right lung lobe; left lung lobe; ventricular zone; zygote; lens; epiblast; primary oocyte; lumbar subsegment of spinal cord; granulocyte; thymus; More reference expression data
BioGPS	n/a
Orthologs
Databases	NCBI: entry; OMA: entry
Species	Human	Mouse
Entrez	219790	170799
Ensembl	ENSG00000182010	ENSMUSG00000037846
UniProt	Q8IZC4	Q14B46
RefSeq (mRNA)	NM_001282941; NM_145307	NM_001081346; NM_133244; NM_001359318; NM_001359319
RefSeq (protein)	NP_001269870; NP_660350	NP_001346247; NP_001346248
Location (UCSC)	Chr 10: 62.18 – 62.27 Mb	Chr 10: 67.82 – 67.9 Mb
PubMed search
- Wikidata
View/Edit Human	View/Edit Mouse

Rhotekin 2 is a protein in humans that is encoded by the RTKN2 gene.
