= ZNF37A =

Protein-coding gene in the species Homo sapiens

Identifiers
- Aliases: ZNF37A, KOX21, ZNF37, zinc finger protein 37A
- External IDs: OMIM: 616085; GeneCards: ZNF37A

Gene location (Human)
Chr.	Chromosome 10 (human)
Band	10p11.1	Start	38,094,334 bp
Band	10p11.1	End	38,150,293 bp
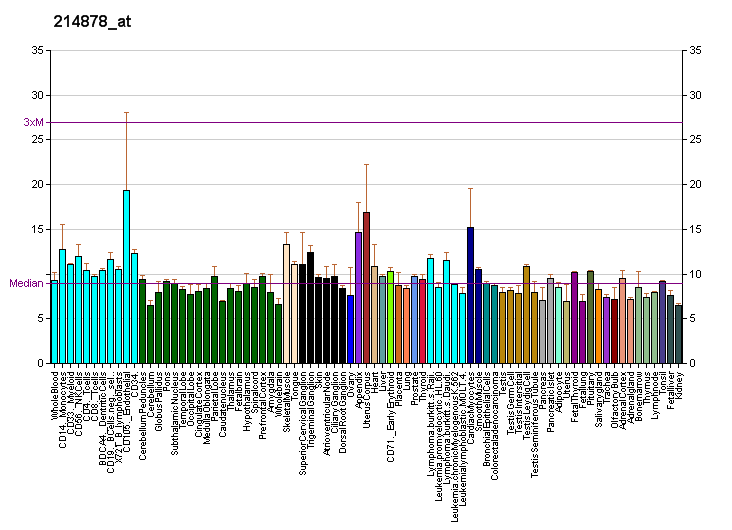
RNA expression pattern
Bgee	Human / Mouse (ortholog); Top expressed in: parotid gland; visceral pleura; parietal pleura; tibia; buccal mucosa cell; tendon of biceps brachii; seminal vesicula; decidua; primary visual cortex; Brodmann area 23 / n/a; More reference expression data
BioGPS	More reference expression data
Gene ontology
Molecular function	DNA-binding transcription factor activity; DNA binding; metal ion binding; nucleic acid binding; DNA-binding transcription factor activity, RNA polymerase II-specific
Cellular component	intracellular anatomical structure; nucleus
Biological process	regulation of transcription, DNA-templated; transcription, DNA-templated; regulation of transcription by RNA polymerase II
Sources:Amigo / QuickGO
Orthologs
Databases	NCBI: entry; OMA: entry
Species	Human	Mouse
Entrez	7587	n/a
Ensembl	ENSG00000075407	n/a
UniProt	P17032	n/a
RefSeq (mRNA)	NM_001007094; NM_001178101; NM_003421; NM_001324245; NM_001324246 NM_001324247; NM_001324248; NM_001324249; NM_001324250; NM_001324251; NM_001324252; NM_001324253; NM_001324254; NM_001324256; NM_001324257; NM_001324258; NM_001324259; NM_001324260; NM_001324261; NM_001324262	n/a
RefSeq (protein)	NP_001007095; NP_001171572; NP_001311174; NP_001311175; NP_001311176 NP_001311177; NP_001311178; NP_001311179; NP_001311180; NP_001311181; NP_001311182; NP_001311183; NP_001311185; NP_001311186; NP_001311187; NP_001311188; NP_001311189; NP_001311190; NP_001311191; NP_003412	n/a
Location (UCSC)	Chr 10: 38.09 – 38.15 Mb	n/a
PubMed search		n/a
- Wikidata
View/Edit Human

Zinc finger protein 37A is a protein that in humans is encoded by the ZNF37A gene.
