= EPC1 =

Protein-coding gene in the species Homo sapiens

Identifiers
- Aliases: EPC1, Epl1, enhancer of polycomb homolog 1
- External IDs: OMIM: 610999; MGI: 1278322; GeneCards: EPC1

Gene location (Human)
Chr.	Chromosome 10 (human)
Band	10p11.22	Start	32,267,751 bp
Band	10p11.22	End	32,378,798 bp

Gene location (Mouse)
Chr.	Chromosome 18 (mouse)
Band	18|18 A1	Start	6,435,951 bp
Band	18|18 A1	End	6,516,108 bp
RNA expression pattern
Bgee	Human / Mouse (ortholog); Top expressed in: epithelium of colon; bone marrow cell; secondary oocyte; pancreatic epithelial cell; mucosa of ileum; endothelial cell; trabecular bone; tibialis anterior muscle; epithelium of lactiferous gland; lactiferous duct / Top expressed in: Rostral migratory stream; primary oocyte; renal corpuscle; medullary collecting duct; cumulus cell; fossa; zygote; conjunctival fornix; condyle; external carotid artery; More reference expression data
BioGPS	n/a
Gene ontology
Molecular function	histone acetyltransferase activity; protein binding
Cellular component	Piccolo NuA4 histone acetyltransferase complex; nuclear membrane; nucleus; NuA4 histone acetyltransferase complex; nucleoplasm
Biological process	vascular associated smooth muscle cell differentiation; regulation of transcription, DNA-templated; negative regulation of transcription by RNA polymerase II; histone H4 acetylation; positive regulation of transcription by RNA polymerase II; histone H2A acetylation; regulation of transcription by RNA polymerase II; positive regulation of transcription, DNA-templated; transcription, DNA-templated; regulation of growth; negative regulation of gene expression, epigenetic; negative regulation of transcription, DNA-templated; negative regulation of G0 to G1 transition; chromatin organization
Sources:Amigo / QuickGO
Orthologs
Databases	NCBI: entry; OMA: entry
Species	Human	Mouse
Entrez	80314	13831
Ensembl	ENSG00000120616	ENSMUSG00000024240
UniProt	Q9H2F5	Q8C9X6
RefSeq (mRNA)	NM_001272004; NM_001272019; NM_001282391; NM_025209	NM_001276350; NM_007935; NM_027497
RefSeq (protein)	NP_001258933; NP_001258948; NP_001269320; NP_079485	NP_001263279; NP_031961; NP_081773
Location (UCSC)	Chr 10: 32.27 – 32.38 Mb	Chr 18: 6.44 – 6.52 Mb
PubMed search
- Wikidata
View/Edit Human	View/Edit Mouse

Enhancer of polycomb homolog 1 is a protein that in humans is encoded by the EPC1 gene.
