= PLXDC2 =

Protein-coding gene in the species Homo sapiens

Identifiers
- Aliases: PLXDC2, TEM7R, plexin domain containing 2
- External IDs: OMIM: 606827; MGI: 1914698; GeneCards: PLXDC2

Gene location (Human)
Chr.	Chromosome 10 (human)
Band	10p12.31	Start	19,816,239 bp
Band	10p12.31	End	20,289,856 bp

Gene location (Mouse)
Chr.	Chromosome 2 (mouse)
Band	2|2 A2- A3	Start	16,361,115 bp
Band	2|2 A2- A3	End	16,760,650 bp
RNA expression pattern
Bgee	Human / Mouse (ortholog); Top expressed in: Achilles tendon; tendon of biceps brachii; saphenous vein; synovial joint; skin of hip; monocyte; lower lobe of lung; Descending thoracic aorta; hair follicle; lactiferous duct / Top expressed in: vestibular membrane of cochlear duct; ankle; umbilical cord; epithelium of lens; esophagus; ascending aorta; right kidney; aortic valve; skin of external ear; lip; More reference expression data
BioGPS	n/a
Orthologs
Databases	NCBI: entry; OMA: entry
Species	Human	Mouse
Entrez	84898	67448
Ensembl	ENSG00000120594	ENSMUSG00000026748
UniProt	Q6UX71	Q9DC11
RefSeq (mRNA)	NM_001282736; NM_032812	NM_026162
RefSeq (protein)	NP_001269665; NP_116201	NP_080438
Location (UCSC)	Chr 10: 19.82 – 20.29 Mb	Chr 2: 16.36 – 16.76 Mb
PubMed search
- Wikidata
View/Edit Human	View/Edit Mouse

Plexin domain-containing protein 2 is a protein that in humans is encoded by the PLXDC2 gene.
