= SCZD11 =

Genetic element in the species Homo sapiens

Identifiers
- Aliases: Schizophrenia susceptibility locuschromosome 10q-related
- External IDs: GeneCards: ; OMA:- orthologs
Orthologs
Species	Human	Mouse
Entrez	404686	n/a
Ensembl	n/a	n/a
UniProt	n a	n/a
RefSeq (mRNA)	n/a	n/a
RefSeq (protein)	n/a	n/a
Location (UCSC)	n/a	n/a
PubMed search		n/a
- Wikidata
View/Edit Human

Schizophrenia susceptibility locus, chromosome 10q-related is a protein that in humans is encoded by the SCZD11 gene.
