= Opalin =

Protein-coding gene in the species Homo sapiens

OPALIN

Identifiers
- Aliases: OPALIN, HTMP10, TMEM10, TMP10, oligodendrocytic myelin paranodal and inner loop protein
- External IDs: OMIM: 617200; MGI: 2657025; HomoloGene: 13237; GeneCards: OPALIN; OMA:OPALIN - orthologs

Gene location (Mouse)
Chr.	Chromosome 19 (mouse)
Band	19|19 C3	Start	41,050,149 bp
Band	19|19 C3	End	41,065,552 bp
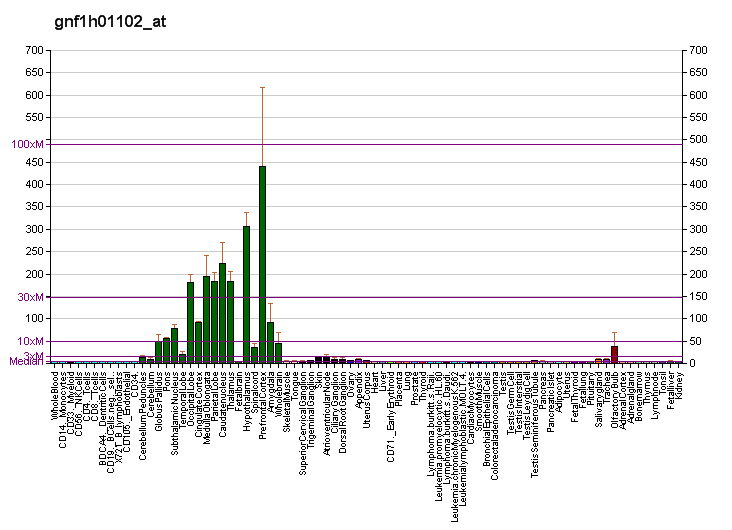
RNA expression pattern
Bgee	Human / Mouse (ortholog); Top expressed in: external globus pallidus; corpus callosum; putamen; amygdala; caudate nucleus; hippocampus proper; substantia nigra; Brodmann area 9; internal globus pallidus; nucleus accumbens / Top expressed in: lumbar subsegment of spinal cord; white matter; anterior horn of spinal cord; nerve; white matter of cerebellum; facial motor nucleus; nucleus of stria terminalis; fornix of the brain; lateral geniculate nucleus; globus pallidus; More reference expression data
BioGPS	More reference expression data
Orthologs
Species	Human	Mouse
Entrez	93377	226115
Ensembl	n/a	ENSMUSG00000050121
UniProt	Q96PE5	Q7M750
RefSeq (mRNA)	NM_001040102; NM_001040103; NM_001284320; NM_001284321; NM_001284322 NM_001284323; NM_001284324; NM_001284326; NM_001284327; NM_033207	NM_153520
RefSeq (protein)	NP_001035191; NP_001035192; NP_001271249; NP_001271250; NP_001271251 NP_001271252; NP_001271253; NP_001271255; NP_001271256; NP_149984	NP_705740
Location (UCSC)	n/a	Chr 19: 41.05 – 41.07 Mb
PubMed search
- Wikidata
View/Edit Human	View/Edit Mouse

Opalin is a protein that is encoded in humans by the OPALIN gene.
