= SPG9 =

Genetic element in the species Homo sapiens

Identifiers
- Aliases: SPG9, spastic paraplegia 9 (autosomal dominant)
- External IDs: GeneCards: SPG9; OMA:SPG9 - orthologs
Orthologs
| Species | Human | Mouse |
| Entrez | 9193 | n/a |
| Ensembl | n/a | n/a |
| UniProt | n a | n/a |
| RefSeq (mRNA) | n/a | n/a |
| RefSeq (protein) | n/a | n/a |
| Location (UCSC) | n/a | n/a |
| PubMed search | | n/a |
- Wikidata
| View/Edit Human |

Spastic paraplegia 9 (autosomal dominant) is a protein that in humans is encoded by the SPG9 gene.
