= Monocarboxylate transporter 12 =

Protein-coding gene in the species Homo sapiens

An Error has occurred retrieving Wikidata item for infobox

Solute carrier family 16 member 12 is a protein that in humans is encoded by the SLC16A12 gene.

== Function ==
This gene encodes a transmembrane transporter that likely plays a role in monocarboxylic acid transport. A mutation in this gene has been associated with juvenile cataracts with microcornea and renal glucosuria. [provided by RefSeq, Mar 2010].
