= PRAP1 =

Protein-coding gene in the species Homo sapiens

Identifiers
- Aliases: PRAP1, PRO1195, UPA, proline-rich acidic protein 1, proline rich acidic protein 1
- External IDs: OMIM: 609776; MGI: 893573; GeneCards: PRAP1

Gene location (Mouse)
Chr.	Chromosome 7 (mouse)
Band	7|7 F4	Start	139,673,308 bp
Band	7|7 F4	End	139,677,113 bp
RNA expression pattern
Bgee	Human / Mouse (ortholog); Top expressed in: duodenum; right lobe of liver; kidney; rectum; tibial nerve; renal cortex; appendix; gallbladder; monocyte; right uterine tube / Top expressed in: duodenum; intestinal villus; epithelium of small intestine; ileum; jejunum; migratory enteric neural crest cell; gastrula; crypt of lieberkuhn of small intestine; decidua; uterus; More reference expression data
BioGPS	n/a
Gene ontology
Molecular function	protein binding; DNA-binding transcription factor activity, RNA polymerase II-specific
Cellular component	extracellular region
Biological process	regulation of transcription by RNA polymerase II
Sources:Amigo / QuickGO
Orthologs
Databases	NCBI: entry
Species	Human	Mouse
Entrez	118471	22264
Ensembl	n/a	ENSMUSG00000025467
UniProt	Q96NZ9	Q80XD8
RefSeq (mRNA)	NM_145202; NM_001145201	NM_009475
RefSeq (protein)	NP_001138673; NP_660203	NP_033501
Location (UCSC)	n/a	Chr 7: 139.67 – 139.68 Mb
PubMed search
- Wikidata
View/Edit Human	View/Edit Mouse

Proline rich acidic protein 1 is a protein that in humans is encoded by the PRAP1 gene.
