= Protein FAM25 =

Pseudogene in the species Homo sapiens

FAM25BP

Identifiers
- Aliases: FAM25BP, FAM25A, FAM25B, FAM25C, FAM25G, protein FAM25
- External IDs: GeneCards: FAM25BP; OMA:FAM25BP - orthologs
Orthologs
Species	Human	Mouse
Entrez	100132929	n/a
Ensembl	ENSG00000273225	n/a
UniProt	n a	n/a
RefSeq (mRNA)	NM_001137556	n/a
RefSeq (protein)	n/a	n/a
Location (UCSC)	n/a	n/a
PubMed search		n/a
- Wikidata
View/Edit Human

Protein FAM25 is a protein that in humans is encoded by the FAM25BP gene.
