= List of human protein-coding genes 1 =

Human protein-coding genes listed in the HGNC database
index	Gene symbol	HGNC and UniProt ID(s)
1	A1BG	HGNC:5; P04217
2	A1CF	HGNC:24086; Q9NQ94
3	A2M	HGNC:7; P01023
4	A2ML1	HGNC:23336; A8K2U0
5	A3GALT2	HGNC:30005; U3KPV4
6	A4GALT	HGNC:18149; Q9NPC4
7	A4GNT	HGNC:17968; Q9UNA3
8	AAAS	HGNC:13666; Q9NRG9
9	AACS	HGNC:21298; Q86V21
10	AADAC	HGNC:17; P22760
11	AADACL2	HGNC:24427; Q6P093
12	AADACL3	HGNC:32037; Q5VUY0
13	AADACL4	HGNC:32038; Q5VUY2
14	AADAT	HGNC:17929; Q8N5Z0
15	AAGAB	HGNC:25662; Q6PD74
16	AAK1	HGNC:19679; Q2M2I8
17	AAMDC	HGNC:30205; Q9H7C9
18	AAMP	HGNC:18; Q13685
19	AANAT	HGNC:19; Q16613
20	AAR2	HGNC:15886; Q9Y312
21	AARD	HGNC:33842; Q4LEZ3
22	AARS1	HGNC:20; P49588
23	AARS2	HGNC:21022; Q5JTZ9
24	AARSD1	HGNC:28417; Q9BTE6
25	AASDH	HGNC:23993; Q4L235
26	AASDHPPT	HGNC:14235; Q9NRN7
27	AASS	HGNC:17366; Q9UDR5
28	AATF	HGNC:19235; Q9NY61
29	AATK	HGNC:21; Q6ZMQ8
30	ABAT	HGNC:23; P80404
31	ABCA1	HGNC:29; O95477
32	ABCA2	HGNC:32; Q9BZC7
33	ABCA3	HGNC:33; Q99758
34	ABCA4	HGNC:34; P78363
35	ABCA5	HGNC:35; Q8WWZ7
36	ABCA6	HGNC:36; Q8N139
37	ABCA7	HGNC:37; Q8IZY2
38	ABCA8	HGNC:38; O94911
39	ABCA9	HGNC:39; Q8IUA7
40	ABCA10	HGNC:30; Q8WWZ4
41	ABCA12	HGNC:14637; Q86UK0
42	ABCA13	HGNC:14638; Q86UQ4
43	ABCB1	HGNC:40; P08183
44	ABCB4	HGNC:45; P21439
45	ABCB5	HGNC:46; Q2M3G0
46	ABCB6	HGNC:47; Q9NP58
47	ABCB7	HGNC:48; O75027
48	ABCB8	HGNC:49; Q9NUT2
49	ABCB9	HGNC:50; Q9NP78
50	ABCB10	HGNC:41; Q9NRK6
51	ABCB11	HGNC:42; O95342
52	ABCC1	HGNC:51; P33527
53	ABCC2	HGNC:53; Q92887
54	ABCC3	HGNC:54; O15438
55	ABCC4	HGNC:55; O15439
56	ABCC5	HGNC:56; O15440
57	ABCC6	HGNC:57; O95255
58	ABCC8	HGNC:59; Q09428
59	ABCC9	HGNC:60; O60706
60	ABCC10	HGNC:52; Q5T3U5
61	ABCC11	HGNC:14639; Q96J66
62	ABCC12	HGNC:14640; Q96J65
63	ABCD1	HGNC:61; P33897
64	ABCD2	HGNC:66; Q9UBJ2
65	ABCD3	HGNC:67; P28288
66	ABCD4	HGNC:68; O14678
67	ABCE1	HGNC:69; P61221
68	ABCF1	HGNC:70; Q8NE71
69	ABCF2	HGNC:71; Q9UG63
70	ABCF3	HGNC:72; Q9NUQ8
71	ABCG1	HGNC:73; P45844
72	ABCG2	HGNC:74; Q9UNQ0
73	ABCG4	HGNC:13884; Q9H172
74	ABCG5	HGNC:13886; Q9H222
75	ABCG8	HGNC:13887; Q9H221
76	ABHD1	HGNC:17553; Q96SE0
77	ABHD2	HGNC:18717; P08910
78	ABHD3	HGNC:18718; Q8WU67
79	ABHD4	HGNC:20154
80	ABHD5	HGNC:21396; Q8WTS1
81	ABHD6	HGNC:21398; Q9BV23
82	ABHD8	HGNC:23759; Q96I13
83	ABHD10	HGNC:25656; Q9NUJ1
84	ABHD11	HGNC:16407; Q8NFV4
85	ABHD12	HGNC:15868; Q8N2K0
86	ABHD12B	HGNC:19837; Q7Z5M8
87	ABHD13	HGNC:20293; Q7L211
88	ABHD14A	HGNC:24538; Q9BUJ0
89	ABHD14B	HGNC:28235; Q96IU4
90	ABHD15	HGNC:26971; Q6UXT9
91	ABHD16A	HGNC:13921; O95870
92	ABHD16B	HGNC:16128; Q9H3Z7
93	ABHD17A	HGNC:28756; Q96GS6
94	ABHD17B	HGNC:24278; Q5VST6
95	ABHD17C	HGNC:26925; Q6PCB6
96	ABHD18	HGNC:26111; Q0P651
97	ABI1	HGNC:11320; Q8IZP0
98	ABI2	HGNC:24011; Q9NYB9
99	ABI3	HGNC:29859; Q9P2A4
100	ABI3BP	HGNC:17265; Q7Z7G0
101	ABITRAM	HGNC:1364; Q9NX38
102	ABL1	HGNC:76; P00519
103	ABL2	HGNC:77; P42684
104	ABLIM1	HGNC:78; O14639
105	ABLIM2	HGNC:19195; Q6H8Q1
106	ABLIM3	HGNC:29132; O94929
107	ABO	HGNC:79; P16442
108	ABR	HGNC:81; Q12979
109	ABRA	HGNC:30655; Q8N0Z2
110	ABRACL	HGNC:21230; Q9P1F3
111	ABRAXAS1	HGNC:25829; Q6UWZ7
112	ABRAXAS2	HGNC:28975; Q15018
113	ABT1	HGNC:17369; Q9ULW3
114	ABTB1	HGNC:18275; Q969K4
115	ABTB2	HGNC:23842; Q8N961
116	ABTB3	HGNC:23844; A6QL63
117	ACAA1	HGNC:82; P09110
118	ACAA2	HGNC:83; P42765
119	ACACA	HGNC:84; Q13085
120	ACACB	HGNC:85; O00763
121	ACAD8	HGNC:87; Q9UKU7
122	ACAD9	HGNC:21497; Q9H845
123	ACAD10	HGNC:21597; Q6JQN1
124	ACAD11	HGNC:30211; Q709F0
125	ACADL	HGNC:88; P28330
126	ACADM	HGNC:89; P11310
127	ACADS	HGNC:90; P16219
128	ACADSB	HGNC:91; P45954
129	ACADVL	HGNC:92; P49748
130	ACAN	HGNC:319; P16112
131	ACAP1	HGNC:16467; Q15027
132	ACAP2	HGNC:16469; Q15057
133	ACAP3	HGNC:16754; Q96P50
134	ACAT1	HGNC:93; P24752
135	ACAT2	HGNC:94; Q9BWD1
136	ACBD3	HGNC:15453; Q9H3P7
137	ACBD4	HGNC:23337; Q8NC06
138	ACBD5	HGNC:23338; Q5T8D3
139	ACBD6	HGNC:23339; Q9BR61
140	ACBD7	HGNC:17715; Q8N6N7
141	ACCS	HGNC:23989; Q96QU6
142	ACCSL	HGNC:34391; Q4AC99
143	ACD	HGNC:25070; Q96AP0
144	ACE	HGNC:2707; P12821
145	ACE2	HGNC:13557; Q9BYF1
146	ACER1	HGNC:18356; Q8TDN7
147	ACER2	HGNC:23675; Q5QJU3
148	ACER3	HGNC:16066; Q9NUN7
149	ACHE	HGNC:108; P22303
150	ACIN1	HGNC:17066; Q9UKV3
151	ACKR1	HGNC:4035; Q16570
152	ACKR2	HGNC:1565; O00590
153	ACKR3	HGNC:23692; P25106
154	ACKR4	HGNC:1611; Q9NPB9
155	ACKR5	HGNC:13708; O15218
156	ACLY	HGNC:115; P53396
157	ACMSD	HGNC:19288; Q8TDX5
158	ACO1	HGNC:117; P21399
159	ACO2	HGNC:118; Q99798
160	ACOD1	HGNC:33904; A6NK06
161	ACOT1	HGNC:33128; Q86TX2
162	ACOT2	HGNC:18431; P49753
163	ACOT4	HGNC:19748; Q8N9L9
164	ACOT6	HGNC:33159; Q3I5F7
165	ACOT7	HGNC:24157; O00154
166	ACOT8	HGNC:15919; O14734
167	ACOT9	HGNC:17152; Q9Y305
168	ACOT11	HGNC:18156; Q8WXI4
169	ACOT12	HGNC:24436; Q8WYK0
170	ACOT13	HGNC:20999; Q9NPJ3
171	ACOX1	HGNC:119; Q15067
172	ACOX2	HGNC:120; Q99424
173	ACOX3	HGNC:121; O15254
174	ACOXL	HGNC:25621; Q9NUZ1
175	ACP1	HGNC:122; P24666
176	ACP2	HGNC:123; P11117
177	ACP3	HGNC:125; P15309
178	ACP4	HGNC:14376; Q9BZG2
179	ACP5	HGNC:124; P13686
180	ACP6	HGNC:29609; Q9NPH0
181	ACP7	HGNC:33781; Q6ZNF0
182	ACR	HGNC:126; P10323
183	ACRBP	HGNC:17195; Q8NEB7
184	ACRV1	HGNC:127; P26436
185	ACSBG1	HGNC:29567; Q96GR2
186	ACSBG2	HGNC:24174; Q5FVE4
187	ACSF2	HGNC:26101; Q96CM8
188	ACSF3	HGNC:27288; Q4G176
189	ACSL1	HGNC:3569; P33121
190	ACSL3	HGNC:3570; O95573
191	ACSL4	HGNC:3571; O60488
192	ACSL5	HGNC:16526; Q9ULC5
193	ACSL6	HGNC:16496; Q9UKU0
194	ACSM1	HGNC:18049; Q08AH1
195	ACSM2A	HGNC:32017; Q08AH3
196	ACSM2B	HGNC:30931; Q68CK6
197	ACSM3	HGNC:10522; Q53FZ2
198	ACSM4	HGNC:32016; P0C7M7
199	ACSM5	HGNC:26060; Q6NUN0
200	ACSM6	HGNC:31665; Q6P461
201	ACSS1	HGNC:16091; Q9NUB1
202	ACSS2	HGNC:15814; Q9NR19
203	ACSS3	HGNC:24723; Q9H6R3
204	ACTA1	HGNC:129; P68133
205	ACTA2	HGNC:130; P62736
206	ACTB	HGNC:132; P60709
207	ACTBL2	HGNC:17780; Q562R1
208	ACTC1	HGNC:143; P68032
209	ACTG1	HGNC:144; P63261
210	ACTG2	HGNC:145; P63267
211	ACTL6A	HGNC:24124; O96019
212	ACTL6B	HGNC:160; O94805
213	ACTL7A	HGNC:161; Q9Y615
214	ACTL7B	HGNC:162; Q9Y614
215	ACTL8	HGNC:24018; Q9H568
216	ACTL9	HGNC:28494; Q8TC94
217	ACTL10	HGNC:16127; Q5JWF8
218	ACTMAP	HGNC:24758; Q5BKX5
219	ACTN1	HGNC:163; P12814
220	ACTN2	HGNC:164; P35609
221	ACTN3	HGNC:165; Q08043
222	ACTN4	HGNC:166; O43707
223	ACTR1A	HGNC:167; P61163
224	ACTR1B	HGNC:168; P42025
225	ACTR2	HGNC:169; P61160
226	ACTR3	HGNC:170; P61158
227	ACTR3B	HGNC:17256; Q9P1U1
228	ACTR3C	HGNC:37282; Q9C0K3
229	ACTR5	HGNC:14671; Q9H9F9
230	ACTR6	HGNC:24025; Q9GZN1
231	ACTR8	HGNC:14672; Q9H981
232	ACTR10	HGNC:17372; Q9NZ32
233	ACTRT1	HGNC:24027; Q8TDG2
234	ACTRT2	HGNC:24026; Q8TDY3
235	ACTRT3	HGNC:24022; Q9BYD9
236	ACVR1	HGNC:171; Q04771
237	ACVR1B	HGNC:172; P36896
238	ACVR1C	HGNC:18123; Q8NER5
239	ACVR2A	HGNC:173; P27037
240	ACVR2B	HGNC:174; Q13705
241	ACVRL1	HGNC:175; P37023
242	ACY1	HGNC:177; Q03154
243	ACY3	HGNC:24104; Q96HD9
244	ACYP1	HGNC:179; P07311
245	ACYP2	HGNC:180; P14621
246	ADA	HGNC:186; P00813
247	ADA2	HGNC:1839; Q9NZK5
248	ADAD1	HGNC:30713; Q96M93
249	ADAD2	HGNC:30714; Q8NCV1
250	ADAM2	HGNC:198; Q99965
251	ADAM7	HGNC:214; Q9H2U9
252	ADAM8	HGNC:215; P78325
253	ADAM9	HGNC:216; Q13443
254	ADAM10	HGNC:188; O14672
255	ADAM11	HGNC:189; O75078
256	ADAM12	HGNC:190; O43184
257	ADAM15	HGNC:193; Q13444
258	ADAM17	HGNC:195; P78536
259	ADAM18	HGNC:196; Q9Y3Q7
260	ADAM19	HGNC:197; Q9H013
261	ADAM20	HGNC:199; O43506
262	ADAM21	HGNC:200; Q9UKJ8
263	ADAM22	HGNC:201; Q9P0K1
264	ADAM23	HGNC:202; O75077
265	ADAM28	HGNC:206; Q9UKQ2
266	ADAM29	HGNC:207; Q9UKF5
267	ADAM30	HGNC:208; Q9UKF2
268	ADAM32	HGNC:15479; Q8TC27
269	ADAM33	HGNC:15478; Q9BZ11
270	ADAMDEC1	HGNC:16299; O15204
271	ADAMTS1	HGNC:217; Q9UHI8
272	ADAMTS2	HGNC:218; O95450
273	ADAMTS3	HGNC:219; O15072
274	ADAMTS4	HGNC:220; O75173
275	ADAMTS5	HGNC:221; Q9UNA0
276	ADAMTS6	HGNC:222; Q9UKP5
277	ADAMTS7	HGNC:223; Q9UKP4
278	ADAMTS8	HGNC:224; Q9UP79
279	ADAMTS9	HGNC:13202; Q9P2N4
280	ADAMTS10	HGNC:13201; Q9H324
281	ADAMTS12	HGNC:14605; P58397
282	ADAMTS13	HGNC:1366; Q76LX8
283	ADAMTS14	HGNC:14899; Q8WXS8
284	ADAMTS15	HGNC:16305; Q8TE58
285	ADAMTS16	HGNC:17108; Q8TE57
286	ADAMTS17	HGNC:17109; Q8TE56
287	ADAMTS18	HGNC:17110; Q8TE60
288	ADAMTS19	HGNC:17111; Q8TE59
289	ADAMTS20	HGNC:17178; P59510
290	ADAMTSL1	HGNC:14632; Q8N6G6
291	ADAMTSL2	HGNC:14631; Q86TH1
292	ADAMTSL3	HGNC:14633; P82987
293	ADAMTSL4	HGNC:19706; Q6UY14
294	ADAMTSL5	HGNC:27912; Q6ZMM2
295	ADAP1	HGNC:16486; O75689
296	ADAP2	HGNC:16487; Q9NPF8
297	ADAR	HGNC:225; P55265
298	ADARB1	HGNC:226; P78563
299	ADARB2	HGNC:227; Q9NS39
300	ADAT1	HGNC:228; Q9BUB4
301	ADAT2	HGNC:21172; Q7Z6V5
302	ADAT3	HGNC:25151; Q96EY9
303	ADCK1	HGNC:19038; Q86TW2
304	ADCK2	HGNC:19039; Q7Z695
305	ADCK5	HGNC:21738; Q3MIX3
306	ADCY1	HGNC:232; Q08828
307	ADCY2	HGNC:233; Q08462
308	ADCY3	HGNC:234; O60266
309	ADCY4	HGNC:235; Q8NFM4
310	ADCY5	HGNC:236; O95622
311	ADCY6	HGNC:237; O43306
312	ADCY7	HGNC:238; P51828
313	ADCY8	HGNC:239; P40145
314	ADCY9	HGNC:240; O60503
315	ADCY10	HGNC:21285; Q96PN6
316	ADCYAP1	HGNC:241; P18509
317	ADCYAP1R1	HGNC:242; P41586
318	ADD1	HGNC:243; P35611
319	ADD2	HGNC:244; P35612
320	ADD3	HGNC:245; Q9UEY8
321	ADGB	HGNC:21212; Q8N7X0
322	ADGRA1	HGNC:13838; Q86SQ6
323	ADGRA2	HGNC:17849; Q96PE1
324	ADGRA3	HGNC:13839; Q8IWK6
325	ADGRB1	HGNC:943; O14514
326	ADGRB2	HGNC:944; O60241
327	ADGRB3	HGNC:945; O60242
328	ADGRD1	HGNC:19893; Q6QNK2
329	ADGRD2	HGNC:18651; Q7Z7M1
330	ADGRE1	HGNC:3336; Q14246
331	ADGRE2	HGNC:3337; Q9UHX3
332	ADGRE3	HGNC:23647; Q9BY15
333	ADGRE5	HGNC:1711; P48960
334	ADGRF1	HGNC:18990; Q5T601
335	ADGRF3	HGNC:18989; Q8IZF5
336	ADGRF4	HGNC:19011; Q8IZF3
337	ADGRF5	HGNC:19030; Q8IZF2
338	ADGRG1	HGNC:4512; Q9Y653
339	ADGRG2	HGNC:4516; Q8IZP9
340	ADGRG3	HGNC:13728; Q86Y34
341	ADGRG4	HGNC:18992; Q8IZF6
342	ADGRG5	HGNC:19010; Q8IZF4
343	ADGRG6	HGNC:13841; Q86SQ4
344	ADGRG7	HGNC:19241; Q96K78
345	ADGRL1	HGNC:20973; O94910
346	ADGRL2	HGNC:18582; O95490
347	ADGRL3	HGNC:20974; Q9HAR2
348	ADGRL4	HGNC:20822; Q9HBW9
349	ADGRV1	HGNC:17416; Q8WXG9
350	ADH1A	HGNC:249; P07327
351	ADH1B	HGNC:250; P00325
352	ADH1C	HGNC:251; P00326
353	ADH4	HGNC:252; P08319
354	ADH5	HGNC:253; P11766
355	ADH6	HGNC:255; P28332
356	ADH7	HGNC:256; P40394
357	ADHFE1	HGNC:16354; Q8IWW8
358	ADI1	HGNC:30576; Q9BV57
359	ADIG	HGNC:28606; Q0VDE8
360	ADIPOQ	HGNC:13633; Q15848
361	ADIPOR1	HGNC:24040; Q96A54
362	ADIPOR2	HGNC:24041; Q86V24
363	ADIRF	HGNC:24043; Q15847
364	ADISSP	HGNC:15873; Q9GZN8
365	ADK	HGNC:257; P55263
366	ADM	HGNC:259; P35318
367	ADM2	HGNC:28898; Q7Z4H4
368	ADM5	HGNC:27293; C9JUS6
369	ADNP	HGNC:15766; Q9H2P0
370	ADNP2	HGNC:23803; Q6IQ32
371	ADO	HGNC:23506; Q96SZ5
372	ADORA1	HGNC:262; P30542
373	ADORA2A	HGNC:263; P29274
374	ADORA2B	HGNC:264; P29275
375	ADORA3	HGNC:268; P0DMS8
376	ADPGK	HGNC:25250; Q9BRR6
377	ADPRH	HGNC:269; P54922
378	ADPRHL1	HGNC:21303; Q8NDY3
379	ADPRM	HGNC:30925; Q3LIE5
380	ADPRS	HGNC:21304; Q9NX46
381	ADRA1A	HGNC:277; P35348
382	ADRA1B	HGNC:278; P35368
383	ADRA1D	HGNC:280; P25100
384	ADRA2A	HGNC:281; P08913
385	ADRA2B	HGNC:282; P18089
386	ADRA2C	HGNC:283; P18825
387	ADRB1	HGNC:285; P08588
388	ADRB2	HGNC:286; P07550
389	ADRB3	HGNC:288; P13945
390	ADRM1	HGNC:15759; Q16186
391	ADSL	HGNC:291; P30566
392	ADSS1	HGNC:20093; Q8N142
393	ADSS2	HGNC:292; P30520
394	ADTRP	HGNC:21214; Q96IZ2
395	AEBP1	HGNC:303; Q8IUX7
396	AEBP2	HGNC:24051; Q6ZN18
397	AEN	HGNC:25722; Q8WTP8
398	AFAP1	HGNC:24017; Q8N556
399	AFAP1L1	HGNC:26714; Q8TED9
400	AFAP1L2	HGNC:25901; Q8N4X5
401	AFDN	HGNC:7137; P55196
402	AFF1	HGNC:7135; P51825
403	AFF2	HGNC:3776; P51816
404	AFF3	HGNC:6473; P51826
405	AFF4	HGNC:17869; Q9UHB7
406	AFG1L	HGNC:16411; Q8WV93
407	AFG2A	HGNC:18119; Q8NB90
408	AFG2B	HGNC:28762; Q9BVQ7
409	AFG3L2	HGNC:315; Q9Y4W6
410	AFM	HGNC:316; P43652
411	AFMID	HGNC:20910; Q63HM1
412	AFP	HGNC:317; P02771
413	AFTPH	HGNC:25951; Q6ULP2
414	AGA	HGNC:318; P20933
415	AGAP1	HGNC:16922; Q9UPQ3
416	AGAP2	HGNC:16921; Q99490
417	AGAP3	HGNC:16923; Q96P47
418	AGAP4	HGNC:23459; Q96P64
419	AGAP5	HGNC:23467; A6NIR3
420	AGAP6	HGNC:23466; Q5VW22
421	AGAP9	HGNC:23463; Q5VTM2
422	AGBL1	HGNC:26504; Q96MI9
423	AGBL2	HGNC:26296; Q5U5Z8
424	AGBL3	HGNC:27981; Q8NEM8
425	AGBL4	HGNC:25892; Q5VU57
426	AGBL5	HGNC:26147; Q8NDL9
427	AGER	HGNC:320; Q15109
428	AGFG1	HGNC:5175; P52594
429	AGFG2	HGNC:5177; O95081
430	AGGF1	HGNC:24684; Q8N302
431	AGK	HGNC:21869; Q53H12
432	AGL	HGNC:321; P35573
433	AGMAT	HGNC:18407; Q9BSE5
434	AGMO	HGNC:33784; Q6ZNB7
435	AGO1	HGNC:3262; Q9UL18
436	AGO2	HGNC:3263; Q9UKV8
437	AGO3	HGNC:18421; Q9H9G7
438	AGO4	HGNC:18424; Q9HCK5
439	AGPAT1	HGNC:324; Q99943
440	AGPAT2	HGNC:325; O15120
441	AGPAT3	HGNC:326; Q9NRZ7
442	AGPAT4	HGNC:20885; Q9NRZ5
443	AGPAT5	HGNC:20886; Q9NUQ2
444	AGPS	HGNC:327; O00116
445	AGR2	HGNC:328; O95994
446	AGR3	HGNC:24167; Q8TD06
447	AGRN	HGNC:329; O00468
448	AGRP	HGNC:330; O00253
449	AGT	HGNC:333; P01019
450	AGTPBP1	HGNC:17258; Q9UPW5
451	AGTR1	HGNC:336; P30556
452	AGTR2	HGNC:338; P50052
453	AGTRAP	HGNC:13539; Q6RW13
454	AGXT	HGNC:341; P21549
455	AGXT2	HGNC:14412; Q9BYV1
456	AHCTF1	HGNC:24618; Q8WYP5
457	AHCY	HGNC:343; P23526
458	AHCYL1	HGNC:344; O43865
459	AHCYL2	HGNC:22204; Q96HN2
460	AHDC1	HGNC:25230; Q5TGY3
461	AHI1	HGNC:21575; Q8N157
462	AHNAK	HGNC:347; Q09666
463	AHNAK2	HGNC:20125; Q8IVF2
464	AHR	HGNC:348; P35869
465	AHRR	HGNC:346; A9YTQ3
466	AHSA1	HGNC:1189; O95433
467	AHSG	HGNC:349; P02765
468	AHSP	HGNC:18075; Q9NZD4
469	AICDA	HGNC:13203; Q9GZX7
470	AIDA	HGNC:25761; Q96BJ3
471	AIF1	HGNC:352; P55008
472	AIF1L	HGNC:28904; Q9BQI0
473	AIFM1	HGNC:8768; O95831
474	AIFM2	HGNC:21411; Q9BRQ8
475	AIFM3	HGNC:26398; Q96NN9
476	AIG1	HGNC:21607; Q9NVV5
477	AIM2	HGNC:357; O14862
478	AIMP1	HGNC:10648; Q12904
479	AIMP2	HGNC:20609; Q13155
480	AIP	HGNC:358; O00170
481	AIPL1	HGNC:359; Q9NZN9
482	AIRE	HGNC:360; O43918
483	AIRIM	HGNC:26039; Q9NX04
484	AJAP1	HGNC:30801; Q9UKB5
485	AJM1	HGNC:37284; C9J069
486	AJUBA	HGNC:20250; Q96IF1
487	AK1	HGNC:361; P00568
488	AK2	HGNC:362; P54819
489	AK3	HGNC:17376; Q9UIJ7
490	AK4	HGNC:363; P27144
491	AK5	HGNC:365; Q9Y6K8
492	AK6	HGNC:49151; Q9Y3D8
493	AK7	HGNC:20091; Q96M32
494	AK8	HGNC:26526; Q96MA6
495	AK9	HGNC:33814; Q5TCS8
496	AKAIN1	HGNC:28285; P0CW23
497	AKAP1	HGNC:367; Q92667
498	AKAP3	HGNC:373; O75969
499	AKAP4	HGNC:374; Q5JQC9
500	AKAP5	HGNC:375; P24588
501	AKAP6	HGNC:376; Q13023
502	AKAP7	HGNC:377; O43687, Q9P0M2
503	AKAP8	HGNC:378; O43823
504	AKAP8L	HGNC:29857; Q9ULX6
505	AKAP9	HGNC:379; Q99996
506	AKAP10	HGNC:368; O43572
507	AKAP11	HGNC:369; Q9UKA4
508	AKAP12	HGNC:370; Q02952
509	AKAP13	HGNC:371; Q12802
510	AKAP14	HGNC:24061; Q86UN6
511	AKAP17A	HGNC:18783; Q02040
512	AKAP19	HGNC:28191; Q9BSF0
513	AKIP1	HGNC:1170; Q9NQ31
514	AKIRIN1	HGNC:25744; Q9H9L7
515	AKIRIN2	HGNC:21407; Q53H80
516	AKNA	HGNC:24108; Q7Z591
517	AKNAD1	HGNC:28398; Q5T1N1
518	AKR1A1	HGNC:380; P14550
519	AKR1B1	HGNC:381; P15121
520	AKR1B10	HGNC:382; O60218
521	AKR1B15	HGNC:37281; C9JRZ8
522	AKR1C1	HGNC:384; Q04828
523	AKR1C2	HGNC:385; P52895
524	AKR1C3	HGNC:386; P42330
525	AKR1C4	HGNC:387; P17516
526	AKR1C8	HGNC:23469; Q5T2L2
527	AKR1D1	HGNC:388; P51857
528	AKR1E2	HGNC:23437; Q96JD6
529	AKR7A2	HGNC:389; O43488
530	AKR7A3	HGNC:390; O95154
531	AKR7L	HGNC:24056; Q8NHP1
532	AKT1	HGNC:391; P31749
533	AKT1S1	HGNC:28426; Q96B36
534	AKT2	HGNC:392; P31751
535	AKT3	HGNC:393; Q9Y243
536	AKTIP	HGNC:16710; Q9H8T0
537	ALAD	HGNC:395; P13716
538	ALAS1	HGNC:396; P13196
539	ALAS2	HGNC:397; P22557
540	ALB	HGNC:399; P02768
541	ALCAM	HGNC:400; Q13740
542	ALDH1A1	HGNC:402; P00352
543	ALDH1A2	HGNC:15472; O94788
544	ALDH1A3	HGNC:409; P47895
545	ALDH1B1	HGNC:407; P30837
546	ALDH1L1	HGNC:3978; O75891
547	ALDH1L2	HGNC:26777; Q3SY69
548	ALDH2	HGNC:404; P05091
549	ALDH3A1	HGNC:405; P30838
550	ALDH3A2	HGNC:403; P51648
551	ALDH3B1	HGNC:410; P43353
552	ALDH3B2	HGNC:411; P48448
553	ALDH4A1	HGNC:406; P30038
554	ALDH5A1	HGNC:408; P51649
555	ALDH6A1	HGNC:7179; Q02252
556	ALDH7A1	HGNC:877; P49419
557	ALDH8A1	HGNC:15471; Q9H2A2
558	ALDH9A1	HGNC:412; P49189
559	ALDH16A1	HGNC:28114; Q8IZ83
560	ALDH18A1	HGNC:9722; P54886
561	ALDOA	HGNC:414; P04075
562	ALDOB	HGNC:417; P05062
563	ALDOC	HGNC:418; P09972
564	ALG1	HGNC:18294; Q9BT22
565	ALG1L2	HGNC:37258; C9J202
566	ALG2	HGNC:23159; Q9H553
567	ALG3	HGNC:23056; Q92685
568	ALG5	HGNC:20266; Q9Y673
569	ALG6	HGNC:23157; Q9Y672
570	ALG8	HGNC:23161; Q9BVK2
571	ALG9	HGNC:15672; Q9H6U8
572	ALG10	HGNC:23162; Q5BKT4
573	ALG10B	HGNC:31088; Q5I7T1
574	ALG11	HGNC:32456; Q2TAA5
575	ALG12	HGNC:19358; Q9BV10
576	ALG13	HGNC:30881; Q9NP73
577	ALG14	HGNC:28287; Q96F25
578	ALK	HGNC:427; Q9UM73
579	ALKAL1	HGNC:33775; Q6UXT8
580	ALKAL2	HGNC:27683; Q6UX46
581	ALKBH1	HGNC:17911; Q13686
582	ALKBH2	HGNC:32487; Q6NS38
583	ALKBH3	HGNC:30141; Q96Q83
584	ALKBH4	HGNC:21900; Q9NXW9
585	ALKBH5	HGNC:25996; Q6P6C2
586	ALKBH6	HGNC:28243; Q3KRA9
587	ALKBH7	HGNC:21306; Q9BT30
588	ALKBH8	HGNC:25189; Q96BT7
589	ALLC	HGNC:17377; Q8N6M5
590	ALMS1	HGNC:428; Q8TCU4
591	ALOX5	HGNC:435; P09917
592	ALOX5AP	HGNC:436; P20292
593	ALOX12	HGNC:429; P18054
594	ALOX12B	HGNC:430; O75342
595	ALOX15	HGNC:433; P16050
596	ALOX15B	HGNC:434; O15296
597	ALOXE3	HGNC:13743; Q9BYJ1
598	ALPG	HGNC:441; P10696
599	ALPI	HGNC:437; P09923
600	ALPK1	HGNC:20917; Q96QP1
601	ALPK2	HGNC:20565; Q86TB3
602	ALPK3	HGNC:17574; Q96L96
603	ALPL	HGNC:438; P05186
604	ALPP	HGNC:439; P05187
605	ALS2	HGNC:443; Q96Q42
606	ALS2CL	HGNC:20605; Q60I27
607	ALX1	HGNC:1494; Q15699
608	ALX3	HGNC:449; O95076
609	ALX4	HGNC:450; Q9H161
610	ALYREF	HGNC:19071; Q86V81
611	AMACR	HGNC:451; Q9UHK6
612	AMBN	HGNC:452; Q9NP70
613	AMBP	HGNC:453; P02760
614	AMBRA1	HGNC:25990; Q9C0C7
615	AMD1	HGNC:457; P17707
616	AMDHD1	HGNC:28577; Q96NU7
617	AMDHD2	HGNC:24262; Q9Y303
618	AMELX	HGNC:461; Q99217
619	AMELY	HGNC:462; Q99218
620	AMER1	HGNC:26837; Q5JTC6
621	AMER2	HGNC:26360; Q8N7J2
622	AMER3	HGNC:26771; Q8N944
623	AMFR	HGNC:463; Q9UKV5
624	AMH	HGNC:464; P03971
625	AMHR2	HGNC:465; Q16671
626	AMIGO1	HGNC:20824; Q86WK6
627	AMIGO2	HGNC:24073; Q86SJ2
628	AMIGO3	HGNC:24075; Q86WK7
629	AMMECR1	HGNC:467; Q9Y4X0
630	AMMECR1L	HGNC:28658; Q6DCA0
631	AMN	HGNC:14604; Q9BXJ7
632	AMN1	HGNC:27281; Q8IY45
633	AMOT	HGNC:17810; Q4VCS5
634	AMOTL1	HGNC:17811; Q8IY63
635	AMOTL2	HGNC:17812; Q9Y2J4
636	AMPD1	HGNC:468; P23109
637	AMPD2	HGNC:469; Q01433
638	AMPD3	HGNC:470; Q01432
639	AMPH	HGNC:471; P49418
640	AMT	HGNC:473; P48728
641	AMTN	HGNC:33188; Q6UX39
642	AMY1A	HGNC:474; P0DUB6
643	AMY1B	HGNC:475; P0DTE7
644	AMY1C	HGNC:476; P0DTE8
645	AMY2A	HGNC:477; P04746
646	AMY2B	HGNC:478; P19961
647	AMZ1	HGNC:22231; Q400G9
648	AMZ2	HGNC:28041; Q86W34
649	ANAPC1	HGNC:19988; Q9H1A4
650	ANAPC2	HGNC:19989; Q9UJX6
651	ANAPC4	HGNC:19990; Q9UJX5
652	ANAPC5	HGNC:15713; Q9UJX4
653	ANAPC7	HGNC:17380; Q9UJX3
654	ANAPC10	HGNC:24077; Q9UM13
655	ANAPC11	HGNC:14452; Q9NYG5
656	ANAPC13	HGNC:24540; Q9BS18
657	ANAPC15	HGNC:24531; P60006
658	ANAPC16	HGNC:26976; Q96DE5
659	ANG	HGNC:483; P03950
660	ANGEL1	HGNC:19961; Q9UNK9
661	ANGEL2	HGNC:30534; Q5VTE6
662	ANGPT1	HGNC:484; Q15389
663	ANGPT2	HGNC:485; O15123
664	ANGPT4	HGNC:487; Q9Y264
665	ANGPTL1	HGNC:489; O95841
666	ANGPTL2	HGNC:490; Q9UKU9
667	ANGPTL3	HGNC:491; Q9Y5C1
668	ANGPTL4	HGNC:16039; Q9BY76
669	ANGPTL5	HGNC:19705; Q86XS5
670	ANGPTL6	HGNC:23140; Q8NI99
671	ANGPTL7	HGNC:24078; O43827
672	ANGPTL8	HGNC:24933; Q6UXH0
673	ANHX	HGNC:40024; E9PGG2
674	ANK1	HGNC:492; P16157
675	ANK2	HGNC:493; Q01484
676	ANK3	HGNC:494; Q12955
677	ANKAR	HGNC:26350; Q7Z5J8
678	ANKDD1A	HGNC:28002; Q495B1
679	ANKDD1B	HGNC:32525; A6NHY2
680	ANKEF1	HGNC:15803; Q9NU02
681	ANKFN1	HGNC:26766; Q8N957
682	ANKFY1	HGNC:20763; Q9P2R3
683	ANKH	HGNC:15492; Q9HCJ1
684	ANKHD1	HGNC:24714; Q8IWZ3
685	ANKIB1	HGNC:22215; Q9P2G1
686	ANKK1	HGNC:21027; Q8NFD2
687	ANKLE1	HGNC:26812; Q8NAG6
688	ANKLE2	HGNC:29101; Q86XL3
689	ANKMY1	HGNC:20987; Q9P2S6
690	ANKMY2	HGNC:25370; Q8IV38
691	ANKRA2	HGNC:13208; Q9H9E1
692	ANKRD1	HGNC:15819; Q15327
693	ANKRD2	HGNC:495; Q9GZV1
694	ANKRD6	HGNC:17280; Q9Y2G4
695	ANKRD7	HGNC:18588; Q92527
696	ANKRD9	HGNC:20096; Q96BM1
697	ANKRD10	HGNC:20265; Q9NXR5
698	ANKRD11	HGNC:21316; Q6UB99
699	ANKRD12	HGNC:29135; Q6UB98
700	ANKRD13A	HGNC:21268; Q8IZ07
701	ANKRD13B	HGNC:26363; Q86YJ7
702	ANKRD13C	HGNC:25374; Q8N6S4
703	ANKRD13D	HGNC:27880; Q6ZTN6
704	ANKRD16	HGNC:23471; Q6P6B7
705	ANKRD17	HGNC:23575; O75179
706	ANKRD18A	HGNC:23643; Q8IVF6
707	ANKRD18B	HGNC:23644; A2A2Z9
708	ANKRD20A1	HGNC:23665; Q5TYW2
709	ANKRD22	HGNC:28321; Q5VYY1
710	ANKRD23	HGNC:24470; Q86SG2
711	ANKRD24	HGNC:29424; Q8TF21
712	ANKRD26	HGNC:29186; Q9UPS8
713	ANKRD27	HGNC:25310; Q96NW4
714	ANKRD28	HGNC:29024; O15084
715	ANKRD29	HGNC:27110; Q8N6D5
716	ANKRD30A	HGNC:17234; Q9BXX3
717	ANKRD30B	HGNC:24165; Q9BXX2
718	ANKRD30BL	HGNC:35167; A7E2S9
719	ANKRD31	HGNC:26853; Q8N7Z5
720	ANKRD33	HGNC:13788; Q7Z3H0
721	ANKRD33B	HGNC:35240; A6NCL7
722	ANKRD34A	HGNC:27639; Q69YU3
723	ANKRD34B	HGNC:33736; A5PLL1
724	ANKRD34C	HGNC:33888; P0C6C1
725	ANKRD35	HGNC:26323; Q8N283
726	ANKRD36	HGNC:24079; A6QL64
727	ANKRD36B	HGNC:29333; Q8N2N9
728	ANKRD36C	HGNC:32946; Q5JPF3
729	ANKRD37	HGNC:29593; Q7Z713
730	ANKRD39	HGNC:28640; Q53RE8
731	ANKRD40	HGNC:28233; Q6AI12
732	ANKRD40CL	HGNC:26080; Q53H64
733	ANKRD42	HGNC:26752; Q8N9B4
734	ANKRD44	HGNC:25259; Q8N8A2
735	ANKRD45	HGNC:24786; Q5TZF3
736	ANKRD46	HGNC:27229; Q86W74
737	ANKRD49	HGNC:25970; Q8WVL7
738	ANKRD50	HGNC:29223; Q9ULJ7
739	ANKRD52	HGNC:26614; Q8NB46
740	ANKRD53	HGNC:25691; Q8N9V6
741	ANKRD54	HGNC:25185; Q6NXT1
742	ANKRD55	HGNC:25681; Q3KP44
743	ANKRD60	HGNC:16217; Q9BZ19
744	ANKRD61	HGNC:22467; A6NGH8
745	ANKRD62	HGNC:35241; A6NC57
746	ANKRD63	HGNC:40027; C9JTQ0
747	ANKRD65	HGNC:42950; E5RJM6
748	ANKRD66	HGNC:44669; B4E2M5
749	ANKS1A	HGNC:20961; Q92625
750	ANKS1B	HGNC:24600; Q7Z6G8
751	ANKS3	HGNC:29422; Q6ZW76
752	ANKS4B	HGNC:26795; Q8N8V4
753	ANKS6	HGNC:26724; Q68DC2
754	ANKUB1	HGNC:29642; A6NFN9
755	ANKZF1	HGNC:25527; Q9H8Y5
756	ANLN	HGNC:14082; Q9NQW6
757	ANO1	HGNC:21625; Q5XXA6
758	ANO2	HGNC:1183; Q9NQ90
759	ANO3	HGNC:14004; Q9BYT9
760	ANO4	HGNC:23837; Q32M45
761	ANO5	HGNC:27337; Q75V66
762	ANO6	HGNC:25240; Q4KMQ2
763	ANO7	HGNC:31677; Q6IWH7
764	ANO8	HGNC:29329; Q9HCE9
765	ANO9	HGNC:20679; A1A5B4
766	ANO10	HGNC:25519; Q9NW15
767	ANOS1	HGNC:6211; P23352
768	ANP32A	HGNC:13233; P39687
769	ANP32B	HGNC:16677; Q92688
770	ANP32D	HGNC:16676; O95626
771	ANP32E	HGNC:16673; Q9BTT0
772	ANPEP	HGNC:500; P15144
773	ANTKMT	HGNC:14152; Q9BQD7
774	ANTXR1	HGNC:21014; Q9H6X2
775	ANTXR2	HGNC:21732; P58335
776	ANTXRL	HGNC:27277; A6NF34
777	ANXA1	HGNC:533; P04083
778	ANXA2	HGNC:537; P07355
779	ANXA2R	HGNC:33463; Q3ZCQ2
780	ANXA3	HGNC:541; P12429
781	ANXA4	HGNC:542; P09525
782	ANXA5	HGNC:543; P08758
783	ANXA6	HGNC:544; P08133
784	ANXA7	HGNC:545; P20073
785	ANXA8	HGNC:546; P13928
786	ANXA8L1	HGNC:23334; Q5VT79
787	ANXA9	HGNC:547; O76027
788	ANXA10	HGNC:534; Q9UJ72
789	ANXA11	HGNC:535; P50995
790	ANXA13	HGNC:536; P27216
791	AOAH	HGNC:548; P28039
792	AOC1	HGNC:80; P19801
793	AOC2	HGNC:549; O75106
794	AOC3	HGNC:550; Q16853
795	AOPEP	HGNC:1361; Q8N6M6
796	AOX1	HGNC:553; Q06278
797	AP1AR	HGNC:28808; Q63HQ0
798	AP1B1	HGNC:554; Q10567
799	AP1G1	HGNC:555; O43747
800	AP1G2	HGNC:556; O75843
801	AP1M1	HGNC:13667; Q9BXS5
802	AP1M2	HGNC:558; Q9Y6Q5
803	AP1S1	HGNC:559; P61966
804	AP1S2	HGNC:560; P56377
805	AP1S3	HGNC:18971; Q96PC3
806	AP2A1	HGNC:561; O95782
807	AP2A2	HGNC:562; O94973
808	AP2B1	HGNC:563; P63010
809	AP2M1	HGNC:564; Q96CW1
810	AP2S1	HGNC:565; P53680
811	AP3B1	HGNC:566; O00203
812	AP3B2	HGNC:567; Q13367
813	AP3D1	HGNC:568; O14617
814	AP3M1	HGNC:569; Q9Y2T2
815	AP3M2	HGNC:570; P53677
816	AP3S1	HGNC:2013; Q92572
817	AP3S2	HGNC:571; P59780
818	AP4B1	HGNC:572; Q9Y6B7
819	AP4E1	HGNC:573; Q9UPM8
820	AP4M1	HGNC:574; O00189
821	AP4S1	HGNC:575; Q9Y587
822	AP5B1	HGNC:25104; Q2VPB7
823	AP5M1	HGNC:20192; Q9H0R1
824	AP5S1	HGNC:15875; Q9NUS5
825	AP5Z1	HGNC:22197; O43299
826	APAF1	HGNC:576; O14727
827	APBA1	HGNC:578; Q02410
828	APBA2	HGNC:579; Q99767
829	APBA3	HGNC:580; O96018
830	APBB1	HGNC:581; O00213
831	APBB1IP	HGNC:17379; Q7Z5R6
832	APBB2	HGNC:582; Q92870
833	APBB3	HGNC:20708; O95704
834	APC	HGNC:583; P25054
835	APC2	HGNC:24036; O95996
836	APCDD1	HGNC:15718; Q8J025
837	APCDD1L	HGNC:26892; Q8NCL9
838	APCS	HGNC:584; P02743
839	APEH	HGNC:586; P13798
840	APELA	HGNC:48925; P0DMC3
841	APEX1	HGNC:587; P27695
842	APEX2	HGNC:17889; Q9UBZ4
843	APH1A	HGNC:29509; Q96BI3
844	APH1B	HGNC:24080; Q8WW43
845	API5	HGNC:594; Q9BZZ5
846	APIP	HGNC:17581; Q96GX9
847	APLF	HGNC:28724; Q8IW19
848	APLN	HGNC:16665; Q9ULZ1
849	APLNR	HGNC:339; P35414
850	APLP1	HGNC:597; P51693
851	APLP2	HGNC:598; Q06481
852	APMAP	HGNC:13238; Q9HDC9
853	APOA1	HGNC:600; P02647
854	APOA2	HGNC:601; P02652
855	APOA4	HGNC:602; P06727
856	APOA5	HGNC:17288; Q6Q788
857	APOB	HGNC:603; P04114
858	APOBEC1	HGNC:604; P41238
859	APOBEC2	HGNC:605; Q9Y235
860	APOBEC3A	HGNC:17343; P31941
861	APOBEC3B	HGNC:17352; Q9UH17
862	APOBEC3C	HGNC:17353; Q9NRW3
863	APOBEC3D	HGNC:17354; Q96AK3
864	APOBEC3F	HGNC:17356; Q8IUX4
865	APOBEC3G	HGNC:17357; Q9HC16
866	APOBEC3H	HGNC:24100; Q6NTF7
867	APOBEC4	HGNC:32152; Q8WW27
868	APOBR	HGNC:24087; Q0VD83
869	APOC1	HGNC:607; P02654
870	APOC2	HGNC:609; P02655
871	APOC3	HGNC:610; P02656
872	APOC4	HGNC:611; P55056
873	APOD	HGNC:612; P05090
874	APOE	HGNC:613; P02649
875	APOF	HGNC:615; Q13790
876	APOH	HGNC:616; P02749
877	APOL1	HGNC:618; O14791
878	APOL2	HGNC:619; Q9BQE5
879	APOL3	HGNC:14868; O95236
880	APOL4	HGNC:14867; Q9BPW4
881	APOL5	HGNC:14869; Q9BWW9
882	APOL6	HGNC:14870; Q9BWW8
883	APOLD1	HGNC:25268; Q96LR9
884	APOM	HGNC:13916; O95445
885	APOO	HGNC:28727; Q9BUR5
886	APOOL	HGNC:24009; Q6UXV4
887	APP	HGNC:620; P05067
888	APPBP2	HGNC:622; Q92624
889	APPL1	HGNC:24035; Q9UKG1
890	APPL2	HGNC:18242; Q8NEU8
891	APRT	HGNC:626; P07741
892	APTX	HGNC:15984; Q7Z2E3
893	AQP1	HGNC:633; P29972
894	AQP2	HGNC:634; P41181
895	AQP3	HGNC:636; Q92482
896	AQP4	HGNC:637; P55087
897	AQP5	HGNC:638; P55064
898	AQP6	HGNC:639; Q13520
899	AQP7	HGNC:640; O14520
900	AQP7B	HGNC:53895; A0A075B734
901	AQP8	HGNC:642; O94778
902	AQP9	HGNC:643; O43315
903	AQP10	HGNC:16029; Q96PS8
904	AQP11	HGNC:19940; Q8NBQ7
905	AQP12A	HGNC:19941; Q8IXF9
906	AQP12B	HGNC:6096; A6NM10
907	AQR	HGNC:29513; O60306
908	AR	HGNC:644; P10275
909	ARAF	HGNC:646; P10398
910	ARAP1	HGNC:16925; Q96P48
911	ARAP2	HGNC:16924; Q8WZ64
912	ARAP3	HGNC:24097; Q8WWN8
913	ARB2A	HGNC:25365; Q8WUF8
914	ARC	HGNC:648; Q7LC44
915	ARCN1	HGNC:649; P48444
916	AREG	HGNC:651; P15514
917	AREL1	HGNC:20363; O15033
918	ARF1	HGNC:652; P84077
919	ARF3	HGNC:654; P61204
920	ARF4	HGNC:655; P18085
921	ARF5	HGNC:658; P84085
922	ARF6	HGNC:659; P62330
923	ARFGAP1	HGNC:15852; Q8N6T3
924	ARFGAP2	HGNC:13504; Q8N6H7
925	ARFGAP3	HGNC:661; Q9NP61
926	ARFGEF1	HGNC:15772; Q9Y6D6
927	ARFGEF2	HGNC:15853; Q9Y6D5
928	ARFGEF3	HGNC:21213; Q5TH69
929	ARFIP1	HGNC:21496; P53367
930	ARFIP2	HGNC:17160; P53365
931	ARFRP1	HGNC:662; Q13795
932	ARG1	HGNC:663; P05089
933	ARG2	HGNC:664; P78540
934	ARGFX	HGNC:30146; A6NJG6
935	ARGLU1	HGNC:25482; Q9NWB6
936	ARHGAP1	HGNC:673; Q07960
937	ARHGAP4	HGNC:674; P98171
938	ARHGAP5	HGNC:675; Q13017
939	ARHGAP6	HGNC:676; O43182
940	ARHGAP8	HGNC:677; P85298
941	ARHGAP9	HGNC:14130; Q9BRR9
942	ARHGAP10	HGNC:26099; A1A4S6
943	ARHGAP11A	HGNC:15783; Q6P4F7
944	ARHGAP11B	HGNC:15782; Q3KRB8
945	ARHGAP12	HGNC:16348; Q8IWW6
946	ARHGAP15	HGNC:21030; Q53QZ3
947	ARHGAP17	HGNC:18239; Q68EM7
948	ARHGAP18	HGNC:21035; Q8N392
949	ARHGAP19	HGNC:23724; Q14CB8
950	ARHGAP20	HGNC:18357; Q9P2F6
951	ARHGAP21	HGNC:23725; Q5T5U3
952	ARHGAP22	HGNC:30320; Q7Z5H3
953	ARHGAP23	HGNC:29293; Q9P227
954	ARHGAP24	HGNC:25361; Q8N264
955	ARHGAP25	HGNC:28951; P42331
956	ARHGAP26	HGNC:17073; Q9UNA1
957	ARHGAP27	HGNC:31813; Q6ZUM4
958	ARHGAP28	HGNC:25509; Q9P2N2
959	ARHGAP29	HGNC:30207; Q52LW3
960	ARHGAP30	HGNC:27414; Q7Z6I6
961	ARHGAP31	HGNC:29216; Q2M1Z3
962	ARHGAP32	HGNC:17399; A7KAX9
963	ARHGAP33	HGNC:23085; O14559
964	ARHGAP35	HGNC:4591; Q9NRY4
965	ARHGAP36	HGNC:26388; Q6ZRI8
966	ARHGAP39	HGNC:29351; Q9C0H5
967	ARHGAP40	HGNC:16226; Q5TG30
968	ARHGAP42	HGNC:26545; A6NI28
969	ARHGAP44	HGNC:29096; Q17R89
970	ARHGAP45	HGNC:17102; Q92619
971	ARHGDIA	HGNC:678; P52565
972	ARHGDIB	HGNC:679; P52566
973	ARHGDIG	HGNC:680; Q99819
974	ARHGEF1	HGNC:681; Q92888
975	ARHGEF2	HGNC:682; Q92974
976	ARHGEF3	HGNC:683; Q9NR81
977	ARHGEF4	HGNC:684; Q9NR80
978	ARHGEF5	HGNC:13209; Q12774
979	ARHGEF6	HGNC:685; Q15052
980	ARHGEF7	HGNC:15607; Q14155
981	ARHGEF9	HGNC:14561; O43307
982	ARHGEF10	HGNC:14103; O15013
983	ARHGEF10L	HGNC:25540; Q9HCE6
984	ARHGEF11	HGNC:14580; O15085
985	ARHGEF12	HGNC:14193; Q9NZN5
986	ARHGEF15	HGNC:15590; O94989
987	ARHGEF16	HGNC:15515; Q5VV41
988	ARHGEF17	HGNC:21726; Q96PE2
989	ARHGEF18	HGNC:17090; Q6ZSZ5
990	ARHGEF19	HGNC:26604; Q8IW93
991	ARHGEF25	HGNC:30275; Q86VW2
992	ARHGEF26	HGNC:24490; Q96DR7
993	ARHGEF28	HGNC:30322; Q8N1W1
994	ARHGEF33	HGNC:37252; A8MVX0
995	ARHGEF35	HGNC:33846; A5YM69
996	ARHGEF37	HGNC:34430; A1IGU5
997	ARHGEF38	HGNC:25968; Q9NXL2
998	ARHGEF39	HGNC:25909; Q8N4T4
999	ARHGEF40	HGNC:25516; Q8TER5
1000	ARID1A	HGNC:11110; O14497
1001	ARID1B	HGNC:18040; Q8NFD5
1002	ARID2	HGNC:18037; Q68CP9
1003	ARID3A	HGNC:3031; Q99856
1004	ARID3B	HGNC:14350; Q8IVW6
1005	ARID3C	HGNC:21209; A6NKF2
1006	ARID4A	HGNC:9885; P29374
1007	ARID4B	HGNC:15550; Q4LE39
1008	ARID5A	HGNC:17361; Q03989
1009	ARID5B	HGNC:17362; Q14865
1010	ARIH1	HGNC:689; Q9Y4X5
1011	ARIH2	HGNC:690; O95376
1012	ARK2C	HGNC:31696; Q6ZSG1
1013	ARK2N	HGNC:28172; Q96B23
1014	ARL1	HGNC:692; P40616
1015	ARL2	HGNC:693; P36404
1016	ARL2BP	HGNC:17146; Q9Y2Y0
1017	ARL3	HGNC:694; P36405
1018	ARL4A	HGNC:695; P40617
1019	ARL4C	HGNC:698; P56559
1020	ARL4D	HGNC:656; P49703
1021	ARL5A	HGNC:696; Q9Y689
1022	ARL5B	HGNC:23052; Q96KC2
1023	ARL5C	HGNC:31111; A6NH57
1024	ARL6	HGNC:13210; Q9H0F7
1025	ARL6IP1	HGNC:697; Q15041
1026	ARL6IP4	HGNC:18076; Q66PJ3
1027	ARL6IP5	HGNC:16937; O75915
1028	ARL6IP6	HGNC:24048; Q8N6S5
1029	ARL8A	HGNC:25192; Q96BM9
1030	ARL8B	HGNC:25564; Q9NVJ2
1031	ARL9	HGNC:23592; Q6T311
1032	ARL10	HGNC:22042; Q8N8L6
1033	ARL11	HGNC:24046; Q969Q4
1034	ARL13A	HGNC:31709; Q5H913
1035	ARL13B	HGNC:25419; Q3SXY8
1036	ARL14	HGNC:22974; Q8N4G2
1037	ARL14EP	HGNC:26798; Q8N8R7
1038	ARL14EPL	HGNC:44201; P0DKL9
1039	ARL15	HGNC:25945; Q9NXU5
1040	ARL16	HGNC:27902; Q0P5N6
1041	ARL17A	HGNC:24096; Q8IVW1
1042	ARL17B	HGNC:32387; Q8IVW1
1043	ARLN	HGNC:19225; Q8WVX3
1044	ARMC1	HGNC:17684; Q9NVT9
1045	ARMC2	HGNC:23045; Q8NEN0
1046	ARMC3	HGNC:30964; Q5W041
1047	ARMC5	HGNC:25781; Q96C12
1048	ARMC6	HGNC:25049; Q6NXE6
1049	ARMC7	HGNC:26168; Q9H6L4
1050	ARMC8	HGNC:24999; Q8IUR7
1051	ARMC9	HGNC:20730; Q7Z3E5
1052	ARMC10	HGNC:21706; Q8N2F6
1053	ARMC12	HGNC:21099; Q5T9G4
1054	ARMCX1	HGNC:18073; Q9P291
1055	ARMCX2	HGNC:16869; Q7L311
1056	ARMCX3	HGNC:24065; Q9UH62
1057	ARMCX4	HGNC:28615; Q5H9R4
1058	ARMCX5	HGNC:25772; Q6P1M9
1059	ARMCX6	HGNC:26094; Q7L4S7
1060	ARMH1	HGNC:34345; Q6PIY5
1061	ARMH2	HGNC:49394; H3BNL8
1062	ARMH3	HGNC:25788; Q5T2E6
1063	ARMH4	HGNC:19846; Q86TY3
1064	ARMS2	HGNC:32685; P0C7Q2
1065	ARNT	HGNC:700; P27540
1066	ARNT2	HGNC:16876; Q9HBZ2
1067	ARPC1A	HGNC:703; Q92747
1068	ARPC1B	HGNC:704; O15143
1069	ARPC2	HGNC:705; O15144
1070	ARPC3	HGNC:706; O15145
1071	ARPC4	HGNC:707; P59998
1072	ARPC5	HGNC:708; O15511
1073	ARPC5L	HGNC:23366; Q9BPX5
1074	ARPIN	HGNC:28782; Q7Z6K5
1075	ARPP19	HGNC:16967; P56211
1076	ARPP21	HGNC:16968; Q9UBL0
1077	ARR3	HGNC:710; P36575
1078	ARRB1	HGNC:711; P49407
1079	ARRB2	HGNC:712; P32121
1080	ARRDC1	HGNC:28633; Q8N5I2
1081	ARRDC2	HGNC:25225; Q8TBH0
1082	ARRDC3	HGNC:29263; Q96B67
1083	ARRDC4	HGNC:28087; Q8NCT1
1084	ARRDC5	HGNC:31407; A6NEK1
1085	ARSA	HGNC:713; P15289
1086	ARSB	HGNC:714; P15848
1087	ARSD	HGNC:717; P51689
1088	ARSF	HGNC:721; P54793
1089	ARSG	HGNC:24102; Q96EG1
1090	ARSH	HGNC:32488; Q5FYA8
1091	ARSI	HGNC:32521; Q5FYB1
1092	ARSJ	HGNC:26286; Q5FYB0
1093	ARSK	HGNC:25239; Q6UWY0
1094	ARSL	HGNC:719; P51690
1095	ART1	HGNC:723; P52961
1096	ART3	HGNC:725; Q13508
1097	ART4	HGNC:726; Q93070
1098	ART5	HGNC:24049; Q96L15
1099	ARTN	HGNC:727; Q5T4W7
1100	ARV1	HGNC:29561; Q9H2C2
1101	ARVCF	HGNC:728; O00192
1102	ARX	HGNC:18060; Q96QS3
1103	AS3MT	HGNC:17452; Q9HBK9
1104	ASAH1	HGNC:735; Q13510
1105	ASAH2	HGNC:18860; Q9NR71
1106	ASAH2B	HGNC:23456; P0C7U1
1107	ASAP1	HGNC:2720; Q9ULH1
1108	ASAP2	HGNC:2721; O43150
1109	ASAP3	HGNC:14987; Q8TDY4
1110	ASB1	HGNC:16011; Q9Y576
1111	ASB2	HGNC:16012; Q96Q27
1112	ASB3	HGNC:16013; Q9Y575
1113	ASB4	HGNC:16009; Q9Y574
1114	ASB5	HGNC:17180; Q8WWX0
1115	ASB6	HGNC:17181; Q9NWX5
1116	ASB7	HGNC:17182; Q9H672
1117	ASB8	HGNC:17183; Q9H765
1118	ASB9	HGNC:17184; Q96DX5
1119	ASB10	HGNC:17185; Q8WXI3
1120	ASB11	HGNC:17186; Q8WXH4
1121	ASB12	HGNC:19763; Q8WXK4
1122	ASB13	HGNC:19765; Q8WXK3
1123	ASB14	HGNC:19766; A6NK59
1124	ASB15	HGNC:19767; Q8WXK1
1125	ASB16	HGNC:19768; Q96NS5
1126	ASB17	HGNC:19769; Q8WXJ9
1127	ASB18	HGNC:19770; Q6ZVZ8
1128	ASCC1	HGNC:24268; Q8N9N2
1129	ASCC2	HGNC:24103; Q9H1I8
1130	ASCC3	HGNC:18697; Q8N3C0
1131	ASCL1	HGNC:738; P50553
1132	ASCL2	HGNC:739; Q99929
1133	ASCL3	HGNC:740; Q9NQ33
1134	ASCL4	HGNC:24311; Q6XD76
1135	ASCL5	HGNC:33169; Q7RTU5
1136	ASDURF	HGNC:53619; L0R819
1137	ASF1A	HGNC:20995; Q9Y294
1138	ASF1B	HGNC:20996; Q9NVP2
1139	ASGR1	HGNC:742; P07306
1140	ASGR2	HGNC:743; P07307
1141	ASH1L	HGNC:19088; Q9NR48
1142	ASH2L	HGNC:744; Q9UBL3
1143	ASIC1	HGNC:100; P78348
1144	ASIC2	HGNC:99; Q16515
1145	ASIC3	HGNC:101; Q9UHC3
1146	ASIC4	HGNC:21263; Q96FT7
1147	ASIC5	HGNC:17537; Q9NY37
1148	ASIP	HGNC:745; P42127
1149	ASL	HGNC:746; P04424
1150	ASMT	HGNC:750; P46597
1151	ASMTL	HGNC:751; O95671
1152	ASNS	HGNC:753; P08243
1153	ASNSD1	HGNC:24910; Q9NWL6
1154	ASPA	HGNC:756; P45381
1155	ASPDH	HGNC:33856; A6ND91
1156	ASPG	HGNC:20123; Q86U10
1157	ASPH	HGNC:757; Q12797
1158	ASPHD1	HGNC:27380; Q5U4P2
1159	ASPHD2	HGNC:30437; Q6ICH7
1160	ASPM	HGNC:19048; Q8IZT6
1161	ASPN	HGNC:14872; Q9BXN1
1162	ASPRV1	HGNC:26321; Q53RT3
1163	ASPSCR1	HGNC:13825; Q9BZE9
1164	ASRGL1	HGNC:16448; Q7L266
1165	ASS1	HGNC:758; P00966
1166	ASTE1	HGNC:25021; Q2TB18
1167	ASTL	HGNC:31704; Q6HA08
1168	ASTN1	HGNC:773; O14525
1169	ASTN2	HGNC:17021; O75129
1170	ASXL1	HGNC:18318; Q8IXJ9
1171	ASXL2	HGNC:23805; Q76L83
1172	ASXL3	HGNC:29357; Q9C0F0
1173	ASZ1	HGNC:1350; Q8WWH4
1174	ATAD1	HGNC:25903; Q8NBU5
1175	ATAD2	HGNC:30123; Q6PL18
1176	ATAD2B	HGNC:29230; Q9ULI0
1177	ATAD3A	HGNC:25567; Q9NVI7
1178	ATAD3B	HGNC:24007; Q5T9A4
1179	ATAD3C	HGNC:32151; Q5T2N8
1180	ATAD5	HGNC:25752; Q96QE3
1181	ATAT1	HGNC:21186; Q5SQI0
1182	ATCAY	HGNC:779; Q86WG3
1183	ATE1	HGNC:782; O95260
1184	ATF1	HGNC:783; P18846
1185	ATF2	HGNC:784; P15336
1186	ATF3	HGNC:785; P18847
1187	ATF4	HGNC:786; P18848
1188	ATF5	HGNC:790; Q9Y2D1
1189	ATF6	HGNC:791; P18850
1190	ATF6B	HGNC:2349; Q99941
1191	ATF7	HGNC:792; P17544
1192	ATF7IP	HGNC:20092; Q6VMQ6
1193	ATF7IP2	HGNC:20397; Q5U623
1194	ATG2A	HGNC:29028; Q2TAZ0
1195	ATG2B	HGNC:20187; Q96BY7
1196	ATG3	HGNC:20962; Q9NT62
1197	ATG4A	HGNC:16489; Q8WYN0
1198	ATG4B	HGNC:20790; Q9Y4P1
1199	ATG4C	HGNC:16040; Q96DT6
1200	ATG4D	HGNC:20789; Q86TL0
1201	ATG5	HGNC:589; Q9H1Y0
1202	ATG7	HGNC:16935; O95352
1203	ATG9A	HGNC:22408; Q7Z3C6
1204	ATG9B	HGNC:21899; Q674R7
1205	ATG10	HGNC:20315; Q9H0Y0
1206	ATG12	HGNC:588; O94817
1207	ATG13	HGNC:29091; O75143
1208	ATG14	HGNC:19962; Q6ZNE5
1209	ATG16L1	HGNC:21498; Q676U5
1210	ATG16L2	HGNC:25464; Q8NAA4
1211	ATG101	HGNC:25679; Q9BSB4
1212	ATIC	HGNC:794; P31939
1213	ATL1	HGNC:11231; Q8WXF7
1214	ATL2	HGNC:24047; Q8NHH9
1215	ATL3	HGNC:24526; Q6DD88
1216	ATM	HGNC:795; Q13315
1217	ATMIN	HGNC:29034; O43313
1218	ATN1	HGNC:3033; P54259
1219	ATOH1	HGNC:797; Q92858
1220	ATOH7	HGNC:13907; Q8N100
1221	ATOH8	HGNC:24126; Q96SQ7
1222	ATOSA	HGNC:25609; Q32MH5
1223	ATOSB	HGNC:25666; Q7L5A3
1224	ATOX1	HGNC:798; O00244
1225	ATP1A1	HGNC:799; P05023
1226	ATP1A2	HGNC:800; P50993
1227	ATP1A3	HGNC:801; P13637
1228	ATP1A4	HGNC:14073; Q13733
1229	ATP1B1	HGNC:804; P05026
1230	ATP1B2	HGNC:805; P14415
1231	ATP1B3	HGNC:806; P54709
1232	ATP1B4	HGNC:808; Q9UN42
1233	ATP2A1	HGNC:811; O14983
1234	ATP2A2	HGNC:812; P16615
1235	ATP2A3	HGNC:813; Q93084
1236	ATP2B1	HGNC:814; P20020
1237	ATP2B2	HGNC:815; Q01814
1238	ATP2B3	HGNC:816; Q16720
1239	ATP2B4	HGNC:817; P23634
1240	ATP2C1	HGNC:13211; P98194
1241	ATP2C2	HGNC:29103; O75185
1242	ATP4A	HGNC:819; P20648
1243	ATP4B	HGNC:820; P51164
1244	ATP5F1A	HGNC:823; P25705
1245	ATP5F1B	HGNC:830; P06576
1246	ATP5F1C	HGNC:833; P36542
1247	ATP5F1D	HGNC:837; P30049
1248	ATP5F1E	HGNC:838; P56381
1249	ATP5IF1	HGNC:871; Q9UII2
1250	ATP5MC1	HGNC:841; P05496
1251	ATP5MC2	HGNC:842; Q06055
1252	ATP5MC3	HGNC:843; P48201
1253	ATP5ME	HGNC:846; P56385
1254	ATP5MF	HGNC:848; P56134
1255	ATP5MG	HGNC:14247; O75964
1256	ATP5MGL	HGNC:13213; Q7Z4Y8
1257	ATP5MJ	HGNC:1188; P56378
1258	ATP5MK	HGNC:30889; Q96IX5
1259	ATP5PB	HGNC:840; P24539
1260	ATP5PD	HGNC:845; O75947
1261	ATP5PF	HGNC:847; P18859
1262	ATP5PO	HGNC:850; P48047
1263	ATP6AP1	HGNC:868; Q15904
1264	ATP6AP2	HGNC:18305; O75787
1265	ATP6V0A1	HGNC:865; Q93050
1266	ATP6V0A2	HGNC:18481; Q9Y487
1267	ATP6V0A4	HGNC:866; Q9HBG4
1268	ATP6V0B	HGNC:861; Q99437
1269	ATP6V0C	HGNC:855; P27449
1270	ATP6V0D1	HGNC:13724; P61421
1271	ATP6V0D2	HGNC:18266; Q8N8Y2
1272	ATP6V0E1	HGNC:863; O15342
1273	ATP6V0E2	HGNC:21723; Q8NHE4
1274	ATP6V1A	HGNC:851; P38606
1275	ATP6V1B1	HGNC:853; P15313
1276	ATP6V1B2	HGNC:854; P21281
1277	ATP6V1C1	HGNC:856; P21283
1278	ATP6V1C2	HGNC:18264; Q8NEY4
1279	ATP6V1D	HGNC:13527; Q9Y5K8
1280	ATP6V1E1	HGNC:857; P36543
1281	ATP6V1E2	HGNC:18125; Q96A05
1282	ATP6V1F	HGNC:16832; Q16864
1283	ATP6V1G1	HGNC:864; O75348
1284	ATP6V1G2	HGNC:862; O95670
1285	ATP6V1G3	HGNC:18265; Q96LB4
1286	ATP6V1H	HGNC:18303; Q9UI12
1287	ATP7A	HGNC:869; Q04656
1288	ATP7B	HGNC:870; P35670
1289	ATP8A1	HGNC:13531; Q9Y2Q0
1290	ATP8A2	HGNC:13533; Q9NTI2
1291	ATP8B1	HGNC:3706; O43520
1292	ATP8B2	HGNC:13534; P98198
1293	ATP8B3	HGNC:13535; O60423
1294	ATP8B4	HGNC:13536; Q8TF62
1295	ATP9A	HGNC:13540; O75110
1296	ATP9B	HGNC:13541; O43861
1297	ATP10A	HGNC:13542; O60312
1298	ATP10B	HGNC:13543; O94823
1299	ATP10D	HGNC:13549; Q9P241
1300	ATP11A	HGNC:13552; P98196
1301	ATP11B	HGNC:13553; Q9Y2G3
1302	ATP11C	HGNC:13554; Q8NB49
1303	ATP12A	HGNC:13816; P54707
1304	ATP13A1	HGNC:24215; Q9HD20
1305	ATP13A2	HGNC:30213; Q9NQ11
1306	ATP13A3	HGNC:24113; Q9H7F0
1307	ATP13A4	HGNC:25422; Q4VNC1
1308	ATP13A5	HGNC:31789; Q4VNC0
1309	ATP23	HGNC:29452; Q9Y6H3
1310	ATPAF1	HGNC:18803; Q5TC12
1311	ATPAF2	HGNC:18802; Q8N5M1
1312	ATPSCKMT	HGNC:27029; Q6P4H8
1313	ATR	HGNC:882; Q13535
1314	ATRAID	HGNC:24090; Q6UW56
1315	ATRIP	HGNC:33499; Q8WXE1
1316	ATRN	HGNC:885; O75882
1317	ATRNL1	HGNC:29063; Q5VV63
1318	ATRX	HGNC:886; P46100
1319	ATXN1	HGNC:10548; P54253
1320	ATXN1L	HGNC:33279; P0C7T5
1321	ATXN2	HGNC:10555; Q99700
1322	ATXN2L	HGNC:31326; Q8WWM7
1323	ATXN3	HGNC:7106; P54252
1324	ATXN3L	HGNC:24173; Q9H3M9
1325	ATXN7	HGNC:10560; O15265
1326	ATXN7L1	HGNC:22210; Q9ULK2
1327	ATXN7L2	HGNC:28713; Q5T6C5
1328	ATXN7L3	HGNC:25416; Q14CW9
1329	ATXN7L3B	HGNC:37931; Q96GX2
1330	ATXN8	HGNC:32925; Q156A1
1331	ATXN10	HGNC:10549; Q9UBB4
1332	AUH	HGNC:890; Q13825
1333	AUNIP	HGNC:28363; Q9H7T9
1334	AUP1	HGNC:891; Q9Y679
1335	AURKA	HGNC:11393; O14965
1336	AURKAIP1	HGNC:24114; Q9NWT8
1337	AURKB	HGNC:11390; Q96GD4
1338	AURKC	HGNC:11391; Q9UQB9
1339	AUTS2	HGNC:14262; Q8WXX7
1340	AVEN	HGNC:13509; Q9NQS1
1341	AVIL	HGNC:14188; O75366
1342	AVL9	HGNC:28994; Q8NBF6
1343	AVP	HGNC:894; P01185
1344	AVPI1	HGNC:30898; Q5T686
1345	AVPR1A	HGNC:895; P37288
1346	AVPR1B	HGNC:896; P47901
1347	AVPR2	HGNC:897; P30518
1348	AWAT1	HGNC:23252; Q58HT5
1349	AWAT2	HGNC:23251; Q6E213
1350	AXDND1	HGNC:26564; Q5T1B0
1351	AXIN1	HGNC:903; O15169
1352	AXIN2	HGNC:904; Q9Y2T1
1353	AXL	HGNC:905; P30530
1354	AZGP1	HGNC:910; P25311
1355	AZI2	HGNC:24002; Q9H6S1
1356	AZIN1	HGNC:16432; O14977
1357	AZIN2	HGNC:29957; Q96A70
1358	AZU1	HGNC:913; P20160
1359	B2M	HGNC:914; P61769
1360	B3GALNT1	HGNC:918; O75752
1361	B3GALNT2	HGNC:28596; Q8NCR0
1362	B3GALT1	HGNC:916; Q9Y5Z6
1363	B3GALT2	HGNC:917; O43825
1364	B3GALT4	HGNC:919; O96024
1365	B3GALT5	HGNC:920; Q9Y2C3
1366	B3GALT6	HGNC:17978; Q96L58
1367	B3GALT9	HGNC:53652; A8MXE2
1368	B3GAT1	HGNC:921; Q9P2W7
1369	B3GAT2	HGNC:922; Q9NPZ5
1370	B3GAT3	HGNC:923; O94766
1371	B3GLCT	HGNC:20207; Q6Y288
1372	B3GNT2	HGNC:15629; Q9NY97
1373	B3GNT3	HGNC:13528; Q9Y2A9
1374	B3GNT4	HGNC:15683; Q9C0J1
1375	B3GNT5	HGNC:15684; Q9BYG0
1376	B3GNT6	HGNC:24141; Q6ZMB0
1377	B3GNT7	HGNC:18811; Q8NFL0
1378	B3GNT8	HGNC:24139; Q7Z7M8
1379	B3GNT9	HGNC:28714; Q6UX72
1380	B4GALNT1	HGNC:4117; Q00973
1381	B4GALNT2	HGNC:24136; Q8NHY0
1382	B4GALNT3	HGNC:24137; Q6L9W6
1383	B4GALNT4	HGNC:26315; Q76KP1
1384	B4GALT1	HGNC:924; P15291
1385	B4GALT2	HGNC:925; O60909
1386	B4GALT3	HGNC:926; O60512
1387	B4GALT4	HGNC:927; O60513
1388	B4GALT5	HGNC:928; O43286
1389	B4GALT6	HGNC:929; Q9UBX8
1390	B4GALT7	HGNC:930; Q9UBV7
1391	B4GAT1	HGNC:15685; O43505
1392	B9D1	HGNC:24123; Q9UPM9
1393	B9D2	HGNC:28636; Q9BPU9
1394	BAALC	HGNC:14333; Q8WXS3
1395	BAAT	HGNC:932; Q14032
1396	BABAM1	HGNC:25008; Q9NWV8
1397	BABAM2	HGNC:1106; Q9NXR7
1398	BACC1	HGNC:28737; Q8IXM2
1399	BACE1	HGNC:933; P56817
1400	BACE2	HGNC:934; Q9Y5Z0
1401	BACH1	HGNC:935; O14867
1402	BACH2	HGNC:14078; Q9BYV9
1403	BAD	HGNC:936; Q92934
1404	BAG1	HGNC:937; Q99933
1405	BAG2	HGNC:938; O95816
1406	BAG3	HGNC:939; O95817
1407	BAG4	HGNC:940; O95429
1408	BAG5	HGNC:941; Q9UL15
1409	BAG6	HGNC:13919; P46379
1410	BAGE	HGNC:942; Q13072
1411	BAGE3	HGNC:15728; Q86Y29
1412	BAGE4	HGNC:15730; Q86Y28
1413	BAHCC1	HGNC:29279; Q9P281
1414	BAHD1	HGNC:29153; Q8TBE0
1415	BAIAP2	HGNC:947; Q9UQB8
1416	BAIAP2L1	HGNC:21649; Q9UHR4
1417	BAIAP2L2	HGNC:26203; Q6UXY1
1418	BAIAP3	HGNC:948; O94812
1419	BAK1	HGNC:949; Q16611
1420	BAMBI	HGNC:30251; Q13145
1421	BANF1	HGNC:17397; O75531
1422	BANF2	HGNC:16172; Q9H503
1423	BANK1	HGNC:18233; Q8NDB2
1424	BANP	HGNC:13450; Q8N9N5
1425	BAP1	HGNC:950; Q92560
1426	BARD1	HGNC:952; Q99728
1427	BARHL1	HGNC:953; Q9BZE3
1428	BARHL2	HGNC:954; Q9NY43
1429	BARX1	HGNC:955; Q9HBU1
1430	BARX2	HGNC:956; Q9UMQ3
1431	BASP1	HGNC:957; P80723
1432	BATF	HGNC:958; Q16520
1433	BATF2	HGNC:25163; Q8N1L9
1434	BATF3	HGNC:28915; Q9NR55
1435	BAX	HGNC:959; Q07812
1436	BAZ1A	HGNC:960; Q9NRL2
1437	BAZ1B	HGNC:961; Q9UIG0
1438	BAZ2A	HGNC:962; Q9UIF9
1439	BAZ2B	HGNC:963; Q9UIF8
1440	BBC3	HGNC:17868; Q96PG8, Q9BXH1
1441	BBIP1	HGNC:28093; A8MTZ0
1442	BBLN	HGNC:17823; Q9BUW7
1443	BBOF1	HGNC:19855; Q8ND07
1444	BBOX1	HGNC:964; O75936
1445	BBS1	HGNC:966; Q8NFJ9
1446	BBS2	HGNC:967; Q9BXC9
1447	BBS4	HGNC:969; Q96RK4
1448	BBS5	HGNC:970; Q8N3I7
1449	BBS7	HGNC:18758; Q8IWZ6
1450	BBS9	HGNC:30000; Q3SYG4
1451	BBS10	HGNC:26291; Q8TAM1
1452	BBS12	HGNC:26648; Q6ZW61
1453	BBX	HGNC:14422; Q8WY36
1454	BCAM	HGNC:6722; P50895
1455	BCAN	HGNC:23059; Q96GW7
1456	BCAP29	HGNC:24131; Q9UHQ4
1457	BCAP31	HGNC:16695; P51572
1458	BCAR1	HGNC:971; P56945
1459	BCAR3	HGNC:973; O75815
1460	BCAS1	HGNC:974; O75363
1461	BCAS2	HGNC:975; O75934
1462	BCAS3	HGNC:14347; Q9H6U6
1463	BCAS4	HGNC:14367; Q8TDM0
1464	BCAT1	HGNC:976; P54687
1465	BCAT2	HGNC:977; O15382
1466	BCCIP	HGNC:978; Q9P287
1467	BCDIN3D	HGNC:27050; Q7Z5W3
1468	BCHE	HGNC:983; P06276
1469	BCKDHA	HGNC:986; P12694
1470	BCKDHB	HGNC:987; P21953
1471	BCKDK	HGNC:16902; O14874
1472	BCL2	HGNC:990; P10415
1473	BCL2A1	HGNC:991; Q16548
1474	BCL2L1	HGNC:992; Q07817
1475	BCL2L2	HGNC:995; Q92843
1476	BCL2L10	HGNC:993; Q9HD36
1477	BCL2L11	HGNC:994; O43521
1478	BCL2L12	HGNC:13787; Q9HB09
1479	BCL2L13	HGNC:17164; Q9BXK5
1480	BCL2L14	HGNC:16657; Q9BZR8
1481	BCL2L15	HGNC:33624; Q5TBC7
1482	BCL3	HGNC:998; P20749
1483	BCL6	HGNC:1001; P41182
1484	BCL6B	HGNC:1002; Q8N143
1485	BCL7A	HGNC:1004; Q4VC05
1486	BCL7B	HGNC:1005; Q9BQE9
1487	BCL7C	HGNC:1006; Q8WUZ0
1488	BCL9	HGNC:1008; O00512
1489	BCL9L	HGNC:23688; Q86UU0
1490	BCL10	HGNC:989; O95999
1491	BCL11A	HGNC:13221; Q9H165
1492	BCL11B	HGNC:13222; Q9C0K0
1493	BCLAF1	HGNC:16863; Q9NYF8
1494	BCLAF3	HGNC:27413; A2AJT9
1495	BCO1	HGNC:13815; Q9HAY6
1496	BCO2	HGNC:18503; Q9BYV7
1497	BCOR	HGNC:20893; Q6W2J9
1498	BCORL1	HGNC:25657; Q5H9F3
1499	BCR	HGNC:1014; P11274
1500	BCS1L	HGNC:1020; Q9Y276
1501	BDH1	HGNC:1027; Q02338
1502	BDH2	HGNC:32389; Q9BUT1
1503	BDKRB1	HGNC:1029; P46663
1504	BDKRB2	HGNC:1030; P30411
1505	BDNF	HGNC:1033; P23560
1506	BDP1	HGNC:13652; A6H8Y1
1507	BEAN1	HGNC:24160; Q3B7T3
1508	BECN1	HGNC:1034; Q14457
1509	BECN2	HGNC:38606; A8MW95
1510	BEGAIN	HGNC:24163; Q9BUH8
1511	BEND2	HGNC:28509; Q8NDZ0
1512	BEND3	HGNC:23040; Q5T5X7
1513	BEND4	HGNC:23815; Q6ZU67
1514	BEND5	HGNC:25668; Q7L4P6
1515	BEND6	HGNC:20871; Q5SZJ8
1516	BEND7	HGNC:23514; Q8N7W2
1517	BEST1	HGNC:12703; O76090
1518	BEST2	HGNC:17107; Q8NFU1
1519	BEST3	HGNC:17105; Q8N1M1
1520	BEST4	HGNC:17106; Q8NFU0
1521	BET1	HGNC:14562; O15155
1522	BET1L	HGNC:19348; Q9NYM9
1523	BEX1	HGNC:1036; Q9HBH7
1524	BEX2	HGNC:30933; Q9BXY8
1525	BEX3	HGNC:13388; Q00994
1526	BEX4	HGNC:25475; Q9NWD9
1527	BEX5	HGNC:27990; Q5H9J7
1528	BFAR	HGNC:17613; Q9NZS9
1529	BFSP1	HGNC:1040; Q12934
1530	BFSP2	HGNC:1041; Q13515
1531	BGLAP	HGNC:1043; P02818
1532	BGN	HGNC:1044; P21810
1533	BHLHA9	HGNC:35126; Q7RTU4
1534	BHLHA15	HGNC:22265; Q7RTS1
1535	BHLHE22	HGNC:11963; Q8NFJ8
1536	BHLHE23	HGNC:16093; Q8NDY6
1537	BHLHE40	HGNC:1046; O14503
1538	BHLHE41	HGNC:16617; Q9C0J9
1539	BHMT	HGNC:1047; Q93088
1540	BHMT2	HGNC:1048; Q9H2M3
1541	BICC1	HGNC:19351; Q9H694
1542	BICD1	HGNC:1049; Q96G01
1543	BICD2	HGNC:17208; Q8TD16
1544	BICDL1	HGNC:28095; Q6ZP65
1545	BICDL2	HGNC:33584; A1A5D9
1546	BICRA	HGNC:4332; Q9NZM4
1547	BICRAL	HGNC:21111; Q6AI39
1548	BID	HGNC:1050; P55957
1549	BIK	HGNC:1051; Q13323
1550	BIN1	HGNC:1052; O00499
1551	BIN2	HGNC:1053; Q9UBW5
1552	BIN3	HGNC:1054; Q9NQY0
1553	BIRC2	HGNC:590; Q13490
1554	BIRC3	HGNC:591; Q13489
1555	BIRC5	HGNC:593; O15392
1556	BIRC6	HGNC:13516; Q9NR09
1557	BIRC7	HGNC:13702; Q96CA5
1558	BIRC8	HGNC:14878; Q96P09
1559	BIVM	HGNC:16034; Q86UB2
1560	BKGD	HGNC:30204; Q9H0W9
1561	BLACAT1	HGNC:48597
1562	BLCAP	HGNC:1055; P62952
1563	BLID	HGNC:33495; Q8IZY5
1564	BLK	HGNC:1057; P51451
1565	BLM	HGNC:1058; P54132
1566	BLMH	HGNC:1059; Q13867
1567	BLNK	HGNC:14211; Q8WV28
1568	BLOC1S1	HGNC:4200; P78537
1569	BLOC1S2	HGNC:20984; Q6QNY1
1570	BLOC1S3	HGNC:20914; Q6QNY0
1571	BLOC1S4	HGNC:24206; Q9NUP1
1572	BLOC1S5	HGNC:18561; Q8TDH9
1573	BLOC1S6	HGNC:8549; Q9UL45
1574	BLTP1	HGNC:26953; Q2LD37
1575	BLTP2	HGNC:28960; Q14667
1576	BLTP3A	HGNC:21216; Q6BDS2
1577	BLTP3B	HGNC:29102; A0JNW5
1578	BLVRA	HGNC:1062; P53004
1579	BLVRB	HGNC:1063; P30043
1580	BLZF1	HGNC:1065; Q9H2G9
1581	BMAL1	HGNC:701; O00327
1582	BMAL2	HGNC:18984; Q8WYA1
1583	BMERB1	HGNC:19213; Q96MC5
1584	BMF	HGNC:24132; Q96LC9
1585	BMI1	HGNC:1066; P35226
1586	BMP1	HGNC:1067; P13497
1587	BMP2	HGNC:1069; P12643
1588	BMP2K	HGNC:18041; Q9NSY1
1589	BMP3	HGNC:1070; P12645
1590	BMP4	HGNC:1071; P12644
1591	BMP5	HGNC:1072; P22003
1592	BMP6	HGNC:1073; P22004
1593	BMP7	HGNC:1074; P18075
1594	BMP8A	HGNC:21650; Q7Z5Y6
1595	BMP8B	HGNC:1075; P34820
1596	BMP10	HGNC:20869; O95393
1597	BMP15	HGNC:1068; O95972
1598	BMPER	HGNC:24154; Q8N8U9
1599	BMPR1A	HGNC:1076; P36894
1600	BMPR1B	HGNC:1077; O00238
1601	BMPR2	HGNC:1078; Q13873
1602	BMS1	HGNC:23505; Q14692
1603	BMX	HGNC:1079; P51813
1604	BNC1	HGNC:1081; Q01954
1605	BNC2	HGNC:30988; Q6ZN30
1606	BNIP1	HGNC:1082; Q12981
1607	BNIP2	HGNC:1083; Q12982
1608	BNIP3	HGNC:1084; Q12983
1609	BNIP3L	HGNC:1085; O60238
1610	BNIP5	HGNC:33769; P0C671
1611	BNIPL	HGNC:16976; Q7Z465
1612	BOC	HGNC:17173; Q9BWV1
1613	BOD1	HGNC:25114; Q96IK1
1614	BOD1L1	HGNC:31792; Q8NFC6
1615	BOD1L2	HGNC:28505; Q8IYS8
1616	BOK	HGNC:1087; Q9UMX3
1617	BOLA1	HGNC:24263; Q9Y3E2
1618	BOLA2	HGNC:29488; Q9H3K6
1619	BOLA2B	HGNC:32479; Q9H3K6
1620	BOLA3	HGNC:24415; Q53S33
1621	BOLL	HGNC:14273; Q8N9W6
1622	BOP1	HGNC:15519; Q14137
1623	BORA	HGNC:24724; Q6PGQ7
1624	BORCS5	HGNC:17950; Q969J3
1625	BORCS6	HGNC:25939; Q96GS4
1626	BORCS7	HGNC:23516; Q96B45
1627	BORCS8	HGNC:37247; Q96FH0
1628	BPGM	HGNC:1093; P07738
1629	BPHL	HGNC:1094; Q86WA6
1630	BPI	HGNC:1095; P17213
1631	BPIFA1	HGNC:15749; Q9NP55
1632	BPIFA2	HGNC:16203; Q96DR5
1633	BPIFA3	HGNC:16204; Q9BQP9
1634	BPIFB1	HGNC:16108; Q8TDL5
1635	BPIFB2	HGNC:16177; Q8N4F0
1636	BPIFB3	HGNC:16178; P59826
1637	BPIFB4	HGNC:16179; P59827
1638	BPIFB6	HGNC:16504; Q8NFQ5
1639	BPIFC	HGNC:16503; Q8NFQ6
1640	BPNT1	HGNC:1096; O95861
1641	BPNT2	HGNC:26019; Q9NX62
1642	BPTF	HGNC:3581; Q12830
1643	BPY2	HGNC:13508; O14599
1644	BPY2B	HGNC:25449; O14599
1645	BPY2C	HGNC:18225; O14599
1646	BRAF	HGNC:1097; P15056
1647	BRAP	HGNC:1099; Q7Z569
1648	BRAT1	HGNC:21701; Q6PJG6
1649	BRCA1	HGNC:1100; P38398
1650	BRCA2	HGNC:1101; P51587
1651	BRCC3	HGNC:24185; P46736
1652	BRD1	HGNC:1102; O95696
1653	BRD2	HGNC:1103; P25440
1654	BRD3	HGNC:1104; Q15059
1655	BRD3OS	HGNC:24742; A0A1B0GUI7
1656	BRD4	HGNC:13575; O60885
1657	BRD7	HGNC:14310; Q9NPI1
1658	BRD8	HGNC:19874; Q9H0E9
1659	BRD9	HGNC:25818; Q9H8M2
1660	BRD10	HGNC:23378; Q5HYC2
1661	BRDT	HGNC:1105; Q58F21
1662	BRF1	HGNC:11551; Q92994
1663	BRF2	HGNC:17298; Q9HAW0
1664	BRI3	HGNC:1109; O95415
1665	BRI3BP	HGNC:14251; Q8WY22
1666	BRICD5	HGNC:28309; Q6PL45
1667	BRINP1	HGNC:2687; O60477
1668	BRINP2	HGNC:13746; Q9C0B6
1669	BRINP3	HGNC:22393; Q76B58
1670	BRIP1	HGNC:20473; Q9BX63
1671	BRIX1	HGNC:24170; Q8TDN6
1672	BRK1	HGNC:23057; Q8WUW1
1673	BRME1	HGNC:28153; Q0VDD7
1674	BRMS1	HGNC:17262; Q9HCU9
1675	BRMS1L	HGNC:20512; Q5PSV4
1676	BROX	HGNC:26512; Q5VW32
1677	BRPF1	HGNC:14255; P55201
1678	BRPF3	HGNC:14256; Q9ULD4
1679	BRS3	HGNC:1113; P32247
1680	BRSK1	HGNC:18994; Q8TDC3
1681	BRSK2	HGNC:11405; Q8IWQ3
1682	BRWD1	HGNC:12760; Q9NSI6
1683	BRWD3	HGNC:17342; Q6RI45
1684	BSCL2	HGNC:15832; Q96G97
1685	BSDC1	HGNC:25501; Q9NW68
1686	BSG	HGNC:1116; P35613
1687	BSN	HGNC:1117; Q9UPA5
1688	BSND	HGNC:16512; Q8WZ55
1689	BSPH1	HGNC:33906; Q075Z2
1690	BSPRY	HGNC:18232; Q5W0U4
1691	BST1	HGNC:1118; Q10588
1692	BST2	HGNC:1119; Q10589
1693	BSX	HGNC:20450; Q3C1V8
1694	BTAF1	HGNC:17307; O14981
1695	BTBD1	HGNC:1120; Q9H0C5
1696	BTBD2	HGNC:15504; Q9BX70
1697	BTBD3	HGNC:15854; Q9Y2F9
1698	BTBD6	HGNC:19897; Q96KE9
1699	BTBD7	HGNC:18269; Q9P203
1700	BTBD8	HGNC:21019; Q5XKL5
1701	BTBD9	HGNC:21228; Q96Q07
1702	BTBD10	HGNC:21445; Q9BSF8
1703	BTBD16	HGNC:26340; Q32M84
1704	BTBD17	HGNC:33758; A6NE02
1705	BTBD18	HGNC:37214; B2RXH4
1706	BTBD19	HGNC:27145; C9JJ37
1707	BTC	HGNC:1121; P35070
1708	BTD	HGNC:1122; P43251
1709	BTF3	HGNC:1125; P20290
1710	BTF3L4	HGNC:30547; Q96K17
1711	BTG1	HGNC:1130; P62324
1712	BTG2	HGNC:1131; P78543
1713	BTG3	HGNC:1132; Q14201
1714	BTG4	HGNC:13862; Q9NY30
1715	BTK	HGNC:1133; Q06187
1716	BTLA	HGNC:21087; Q7Z6A9
1717	BTN1A1	HGNC:1135; Q13410
1718	BTN2A1	HGNC:1136; Q7KYR7
1719	BTN2A2	HGNC:1137; Q8WVV5
1720	BTN3A1	HGNC:1138; O00481
1721	BTN3A2	HGNC:1139; P78410
1722	BTN3A3	HGNC:1140; O00478
1723	BTNL2	HGNC:1142; Q9UIR0
1724	BTNL3	HGNC:1143; Q6UXE8
1725	BTNL8	HGNC:26131; Q6UX41
1726	BTNL9	HGNC:24176; Q6UXG8
1727	BTRC	HGNC:1144; Q9Y297
1728	BUB1	HGNC:1148; O43683
1729	BUB1B	HGNC:1149; O60566
1730	BUB3	HGNC:1151; O43684
1731	BUD13	HGNC:28199; Q9BRD0
1732	BUD23	HGNC:16405; O43709
1733	BUD31	HGNC:29629; P41223
1734	BYSL	HGNC:1157; Q13895
1735	BZW1	HGNC:18380; Q7L1Q6
1736	BZW2	HGNC:18808; Q9Y6E2
1737	C1D	HGNC:29911; Q13901
1738	C1GALT1	HGNC:24337; Q9NS00
1739	C1GALT1C1	HGNC:24338; Q96EU7
1740	C1GALT1C1L	HGNC:51617; P0DN25
1741	C1orf21	HGNC:15494; Q9H246
1742	C1orf35	HGNC:19032; Q9BU76
1743	C1orf50	HGNC:28795; Q9BV19
1744	C1orf52	HGNC:24871; Q8N6N3
1745	C1orf53	HGNC:30003; Q5VUE5
1746	C1orf54	HGNC:26258; Q8WWF1
1747	C1orf56	HGNC:26045; Q9BUN1
1748	C1orf74	HGNC:26319; Q96LT6
1749	C1orf87	HGNC:28547; Q8N0U7
1750	C1orf94	HGNC:28250; Q6P1W5
1751	C1orf105	HGNC:29591; O95561
1752	C1orf115	HGNC:25873; Q9H7X2
1753	C1orf116	HGNC:28667; Q9BW04
1754	C1orf122	HGNC:24789; Q6ZSJ8
1755	C1orf141	HGNC:32044; Q5JVX7
1756	C1orf146	HGNC:24032; Q5VVC0
1757	C1orf159	HGNC:26062; Q96HA4
1758	C1orf162	HGNC:28344; Q8NEQ5
1759	C1orf167	HGNC:25262; Q5SNV9
1760	C1orf174	HGNC:27915; Q8IYL3
1761	C1orf185	HGNC:28096; Q5T7R7
1762	C1orf198	HGNC:25900; Q9H425
1763	C1orf202	HGNC:56760; A0A1W2PPE3
1764	C1orf210	HGNC:28755; Q8IVY1
1765	C1orf216	HGNC:26800; Q8TAB5
1766	C1orf226	HGNC:34351; A1L170
1767	C1orf232	HGNC:53426; A0A0U1RR37
1768	C1QA	HGNC:1241; P02745
1769	C1QB	HGNC:1242; P02746
1770	C1QBP	HGNC:1243; Q07021
1771	C1QC	HGNC:1245; P02747
1772	C1QL1	HGNC:24182; O75973
1773	C1QL2	HGNC:24181; Q7Z5L3
1774	C1QL3	HGNC:19359; Q5VWW1
1775	C1QL4	HGNC:31416; Q86Z23
1776	C1QTNF1	HGNC:14324; Q9BXJ1
1777	C1QTNF2	HGNC:14325; Q9BXJ5
1778	C1QTNF3	HGNC:14326; Q9BXJ4
1779	C1QTNF4	HGNC:14346; Q9BXJ3
1780	C1QTNF5	HGNC:14344; Q9BXJ0
1781	C1QTNF6	HGNC:14343; Q9BXI9
1782	C1QTNF7	HGNC:14342; Q9BXJ2
1783	C1QTNF8	HGNC:31374; P60827
1784	C1QTNF9	HGNC:28732; P0C862
1785	C1QTNF9B	HGNC:34072; B2RNN3
1786	C1QTNF12	HGNC:32308; Q5T7M4
1787	C1R	HGNC:1246; P00736
1788	C1RL	HGNC:21265; Q9NZP8
1789	C1S	HGNC:1247; P09871
1790	C2	HGNC:1248; P06681
1791	C2CD2	HGNC:1266; Q9Y426
1792	C2CD2L	HGNC:29000; O14523
1793	C2CD3	HGNC:24564; Q4AC94
1794	C2CD4A	HGNC:33627; Q8NCU7
1795	C2CD4B	HGNC:33628; A6NLJ0
1796	C2CD4C	HGNC:29417; Q8TF44
1797	C2CD4D	HGNC:37210; B7Z1M9
1798	C2CD5	HGNC:29062; Q86YS7
1799	C2orf15	HGNC:28436; Q8WU43
1800	C2orf42	HGNC:26056; Q9NWW7
1801	C2orf49	HGNC:28772; Q9BVC5
1802	C2orf66	HGNC:33809; Q6UXQ4
1803	C2orf68	HGNC:34353; Q2NKX9
1804	C2orf69	HGNC:26799; Q8N8R5
1805	C2orf72	HGNC:27418; A6NCS6
1806	C2orf74	HGNC:34439; A8MZ97
1807	C2orf76	HGNC:27017; Q3KRA6
1808	C2orf78	HGNC:34349; A6NCI8
1809	C2orf80	HGNC:34352; Q0P641
1810	C2orf81	HGNC:34350; A6NN90
1811	C2orf92	HGNC:49272; A0A1B0GVN3
1812	C3	HGNC:1318; P01024
1813	C3AR1	HGNC:1319; Q16581
1814	C3orf18	HGNC:24837; Q9UK00
1815	C3orf20	HGNC:25320; Q8ND61
1816	C3orf22	HGNC:28534; Q8N5N4
1817	C3orf33	HGNC:26434; Q6P1S2
1818	C3orf38	HGNC:28384; Q5JPI3
1819	C3orf49	HGNC:25190; Q96BT1
1820	C3orf52	HGNC:26255; Q5BVD1
1821	C3orf62	HGNC:24771; Q6ZUJ4
1822	C3orf70	HGNC:33731; A6NLC5
1823	C3orf80	HGNC:40048; F5H4A9
1824	C3orf85	HGNC:53432; A0A1B0GTC6
1825	C4A	HGNC:1323; P0C0L4
1826	C4B	HGNC:1324; P0C0L5
1827	C4BPA	HGNC:1325; P04003
1828	C4BPB	HGNC:1328; P20851
1829	C4orf17	HGNC:25274; Q53FE4
1830	C4orf33	HGNC:27025; Q8N1A6
1831	C4orf36	HGNC:28386; Q96KX1
1832	C4orf46	HGNC:27320; Q504U0
1833	C4orf50	HGNC:33766; Q6ZRC1
1834	C4orf51	HGNC:37264; C9J302
1835	C4orf54	HGNC:27741; D6RIA3
1836	C5	HGNC:1331; P01031
1837	C5AR1	HGNC:1338; P21730
1838	C5AR2	HGNC:4527; Q9P296
1839	C5orf15	HGNC:20656; Q8NC54
1840	C5orf22	HGNC:25639; Q49AR2
1841	C5orf24	HGNC:26746; Q7Z6I8
1842	C5orf34	HGNC:24738; Q96MH7
1843	C5orf46	HGNC:33768; Q6UWT4
1844	C5orf47	HGNC:27026; Q569G3
1845	C5orf52	HGNC:35121; A6NGY3
1846	C5orf58	HGNC:37272; C9J3I9
1847	C5orf63	HGNC:40051; A6NC05
1848	C6	HGNC:1339; P13671
1849	C6orf15	HGNC:13927; Q6UXA7
1850	C6orf47	HGNC:19076; O95873
1851	C6orf52	HGNC:20881; Q5T4I8
1852	C6orf58	HGNC:20960; Q6P5S2
1853	C6orf62	HGNC:20998; Q9GZU0
1854	C6orf89	HGNC:21114; Q6UWU4
1855	C6orf118	HGNC:21233; Q5T5N4
1856	C6orf120	HGNC:21247; Q7Z4R8
1857	C6orf132	HGNC:21288; Q5T0Z8
1858	C6orf136	HGNC:21301; Q5SQH8
1859	C6orf141	HGNC:21351; Q5SZD1
1860	C6orf163	HGNC:21403; Q5TEZ5
1861	C7	HGNC:1346; P10643
1862	C7orf25	HGNC:21703; Q9BPX7
1863	C7orf33	HGNC:21724; Q8WU49
1864	C7orf57	HGNC:22247; Q8NEG2
1865	C7orf78	HGNC:55185; A0A1B0GVB3
1866	C8A	HGNC:1352; P07357
1867	C8B	HGNC:1353; P07358
1868	C8G	HGNC:1354; P07360
1869	C8orf33	HGNC:26104; Q9H7E9
1870	C8orf34	HGNC:30905; Q49A92
1871	C8orf48	HGNC:26345; Q96LL4
1872	C8orf58	HGNC:32233; Q8NAV2
1873	C8orf74	HGNC:32296; Q6P047
1874	C8orf76	HGNC:25924; Q96K31
1875	C8orf82	HGNC:33826; Q6P1X6
1876	C8orf88	HGNC:44672; P0DMB2
1877	C8orf89	HGNC:51258; P0DMQ9
1878	C8orf90	HGNC:56305; A0A2R8Y2Y2
1879	C9	HGNC:1358; P02748
1880	C9orf40	HGNC:23433; Q8IXQ3
1881	C9orf43	HGNC:23570; Q8TAL5
1882	C9orf50	HGNC:23677; Q5SZB4
1883	C9orf57	HGNC:27037; Q5W0N0
1884	C9orf72	HGNC:28337; Q96LT7
1885	C9orf78	HGNC:24932; Q9NZ63
1886	C9orf85	HGNC:28784; Q96MD7
1887	C9orf152	HGNC:31455; Q5JTZ5
1888	C9orf153	HGNC:31456; Q5TBE3
1889	C10orf53	HGNC:27421; Q8N6V4
1890	C10orf62	HGNC:23294; Q5T681
1891	C10orf67	HGNC:28716; Q8IYJ2
1892	C10orf71	HGNC:26973; Q711Q0
1893	C10orf88	HGNC:25822; Q9H8K7
1894	C10orf90	HGNC:26563
1895	C10orf95	HGNC:25880; Q9H7T3
1896	C10orf105	HGNC:20304; Q8TEF2
1897	C10orf120	HGNC:25707; Q5SQS8
1898	C10orf126	HGNC:28693; Q8N4M7
1899	C10orf143	HGNC:48677; A0A1B0GUT2
1900	C11orf16	HGNC:1169; Q9NQ32
1901	C11orf21	HGNC:13231; Q9P2W6
1902	C11orf24	HGNC:1174; Q96F05
1903	C11orf42	HGNC:28541; Q8N5U0
1904	C11orf52	HGNC:30531; Q96A22
1905	C11orf58	HGNC:16990; O00193
1906	C11orf65	HGNC:28519; Q8NCR3
1907	C11orf68	HGNC:28801; Q9H3H3
1908	C11orf71	HGNC:25937; Q6IPW1
1909	C11orf86	HGNC:34442; A6NJI1
1910	C11orf87	HGNC:33788; Q6NUJ2
1911	C11orf91	HGNC:34444; Q3C1V1
1912	C11orf96	HGNC:38675; Q7Z7L8
1913	C11orf97	HGNC:49544; A0A1B0GVM6
1914	C11orf98	HGNC:51238; E9PRG8
1915	C12orf42	HGNC:24729; Q96LP6
1916	C12orf43	HGNC:25719; Q96C57
1917	C12orf50	HGNC:26665; Q8NA57
1918	C12orf54	HGNC:28553; Q6X4T0
1919	C12orf56	HGNC:26967; Q8IXR9
1920	C12orf57	HGNC:29521; Q99622
1921	C12orf60	HGNC:28726; Q5U649
1922	C12orf71	HGNC:34452; A8MTZ7
1923	C12orf75	HGNC:35164; Q8TAD7
1924	C12orf76	HGNC:33790; Q8N812
1925	C13orf42	HGNC:42693; A0A1B0GVH6
1926	C13orf46	HGNC:53786; A0A1B0GUA9
1927	C14orf39	HGNC:19849; Q8N1H7
1928	C14orf93	HGNC:20162; Q9H972
1929	C14orf119	HGNC:20270; Q9NWQ9
1930	C14orf132	HGNC:20346; Q9NPU4
1931	C14orf180	HGNC:33795; Q8N912
1932	C15orf39	HGNC:24497; Q6ZRI6
1933	C15orf40	HGNC:28443; Q8WUR7
1934	C15orf61	HGNC:34453; A6NNL5
1935	C15orf62	HGNC:34489; A8K5M9
1936	C16orf46	HGNC:26525; Q6P387
1937	C16orf54	HGNC:26649; Q6UWD8
1938	C16orf74	HGNC:23362; Q96GX8
1939	C16orf78	HGNC:28479; Q8WTQ4
1940	C16orf82	HGNC:30755; Q7Z2V1
1941	C16orf86	HGNC:33755; Q6ZW13
1942	C16orf87	HGNC:33754; Q6PH81
1943	C16orf89	HGNC:28687; Q6UX73
1944	C16orf90	HGNC:34455; A8MZG2
1945	C16orf92	HGNC:26346; Q96LL3
1946	C16orf95	HGNC:40033; Q9H693
1947	C16orf96	HGNC:40031; A6NNT2
1948	C17orf50	HGNC:29581; Q8WW18
1949	C17orf58	HGNC:27568; Q2M2W7
1950	C17orf67	HGNC:27900; Q0P5P2
1951	C17orf75	HGNC:30173; Q9HAS0
1952	C17orf78	HGNC:26831; Q8N4C9
1953	C17orf99	HGNC:34490; Q6UX52
1954	C17orf100	HGNC:34494; A8MU93
1955	C17orf107	HGNC:37238; Q6ZR85
1956	C17orf113	HGNC:53437; A0A1B0GUU1
1957	C17orf114	HGNC:55343; A0A1B0GUV1
1958	C18orf32	HGNC:31690; Q8TCD1
1959	C18orf54	HGNC:13796; Q8IYD9
1960	C18orf63	HGNC:40037; Q68DL7
1961	C19orf12	HGNC:25443; Q9NSK7
1962	C19orf18	HGNC:28642; Q8NEA5
1963	C19orf25	HGNC:26711; Q9UFG5
1964	C19orf33	HGNC:16668; Q9GZP8
1965	C19orf38	HGNC:34073; A8MVS5
1966	C19orf44	HGNC:26141; Q9H6X5
1967	C19orf47	HGNC:26723; Q8N9M1
1968	C19orf53	HGNC:24991; Q9UNZ5
1969	C19orf67	HGNC:34354; A6NJJ6
1970	C19orf73	HGNC:25534; Q9NVV2
1971	C19orf81	HGNC:40041; C9J6K1
1972	C19orf84	HGNC:27112; I3L1E1
1973	C19orf85	HGNC:53653; A0A1B0GUS0
1974	C20orf96	HGNC:16227; Q9NUD7
1975	C20orf141	HGNC:16134; Q9NUB4
1976	C20orf144	HGNC:16137; Q9BQM9
1977	C20orf173	HGNC:16166; Q96LM9
1978	C20orf202	HGNC:37254; A1L168
1979	C20orf203	HGNC:26592; Q8NBC4
1980	C20orf204	HGNC:27655; A0A1B0GTL2
1981	C21orf58	HGNC:1300; P58505
1982	C21orf91	HGNC:16459; Q9NYK6
1983	C21orf140	HGNC:39602; B9A014
1984	C22orf15	HGNC:15558; Q8WYQ4
1985	C22orf23	HGNC:18589; Q9BZE7
1986	C22orf31	HGNC:26931; O95567
1987	C22orf39	HGNC:27012; Q6P5X5
1988	C22orf42	HGNC:27160; Q6IC83
1989	CA1	HGNC:1368; P00915
1990	CA2	HGNC:1373; P00918
1991	CA3	HGNC:1374; P07451
1992	CA4	HGNC:1375; P22748
1993	CA5A	HGNC:1377; P35218
1994	CA5B	HGNC:1378; Q9Y2D0
1995	CA6	HGNC:1380; P23280
1996	CA7	HGNC:1381; P43166
1997	CA8	HGNC:1382; P35219
1998	CA9	HGNC:1383; Q16790
1999	CA10	HGNC:1369; Q9NS85
2000	CA11	HGNC:1370; O75493
2001	CA12	HGNC:1371; O43570
2002	CA13	HGNC:14914; Q8N1Q1
2003	CA14	HGNC:1372; Q9ULX7
2004	CAAP1	HGNC:25834; Q9H8G2
2005	CAB39	HGNC:20292; Q9Y376
2006	CAB39L	HGNC:20290; Q9H9S4
2007	CABCOCO1	HGNC:28678; Q8IVU9
2008	CABIN1	HGNC:24187; Q9Y6J0
2009	CABLES1	HGNC:25097; Q8TDN4
2010	CABLES2	HGNC:16143; Q9BTV7
2011	CABP1	HGNC:1384; Q9NZU7
2012	CABP2	HGNC:1385; Q9NPB3
2013	CABP4	HGNC:1386; P57796
2014	CABP5	HGNC:13714; Q9NP86
2015	CABP7	HGNC:20834; Q86V35
2016	CABS1	HGNC:30710; Q96KC9
2017	CABYR	HGNC:15569; O75952
2018	CACFD1	HGNC:1365; Q9UGQ2
2019	CACHD1	HGNC:29314; Q5VU97
2020	CACNA1A	HGNC:1388; O00555
2021	CACNA1B	HGNC:1389; Q00975
2022	CACNA1C	HGNC:1390; Q13936
2023	CACNA1D	HGNC:1391; Q01668
2024	CACNA1E	HGNC:1392; Q15878
2025	CACNA1F	HGNC:1393; O60840
2026	CACNA1G	HGNC:1394; O43497
2027	CACNA1H	HGNC:1395; O95180
2028	CACNA1I	HGNC:1396; Q9P0X4
2029	CACNA1S	HGNC:1397; Q13698
2030	CACNA2D1	HGNC:1399; P54289
2031	CACNA2D2	HGNC:1400; Q9NY47
2032	CACNA2D3	HGNC:15460; Q8IZS8
2033	CACNA2D4	HGNC:20202; Q7Z3S7
2034	CACNB1	HGNC:1401; Q02641
2035	CACNB2	HGNC:1402; Q08289
2036	CACNB3	HGNC:1403; P54284
2037	CACNB4	HGNC:1404; O00305
2038	CACNG1	HGNC:1405; Q06432
2039	CACNG2	HGNC:1406; Q9Y698
2040	CACNG3	HGNC:1407; O60359
2041	CACNG4	HGNC:1408; Q9UBN1
2042	CACNG5	HGNC:1409; Q9UF02
2043	CACNG6	HGNC:13625; Q9BXT2
2044	CACNG7	HGNC:13626; P62955
2045	CACNG8	HGNC:13628; Q8WXS5
2046	CACTIN	HGNC:29938; Q8WUQ7
2047	CACUL1	HGNC:23727; Q86Y37
2048	CACYBP	HGNC:30423; Q9HB71
2049	CAD	HGNC:1424; P27708
2050	CADM1	HGNC:5951; Q9BY67
2051	CADM2	HGNC:29849; Q8N3J6
2052	CADM3	HGNC:17601; Q8N126
2053	CADM4	HGNC:30825; Q8NFZ8
2054	CADPS	HGNC:1426; Q9ULU8
2055	CADPS2	HGNC:16018; Q86UW7
2056	CAGE1	HGNC:21622; Q8TC20
2057	CALB1	HGNC:1434; P05937
2058	CALB2	HGNC:1435; P22676
2059	CALCA	HGNC:1437; P01258, P06881
2060	CALCB	HGNC:1438; P10092
2061	CALCOCO1	HGNC:29306; Q9P1Z2
2062	CALCOCO2	HGNC:29912; Q13137
2063	CALCR	HGNC:1440; P30988
2064	CALCRL	HGNC:16709; Q16602
2065	CALD1	HGNC:1441; Q05682
2066	CALHM1	HGNC:23494; Q8IU99
2067	CALHM2	HGNC:23493; Q9HA72
2068	CALHM3	HGNC:23458; Q86XJ0
2069	CALHM4	HGNC:21094; Q5JW98
2070	CALHM5	HGNC:21568; Q8N5C1
2071	CALHM6	HGNC:33391; Q5R3K3
2072	CALM1	HGNC:1442; P0DP23
2073	CALM2	HGNC:1445; P0DP24
2074	CALM3	HGNC:1449; P0DP25
2075	CALML3	HGNC:1452; P27482
2076	CALML4	HGNC:18445; Q96GE6
2077	CALML5	HGNC:18180; Q9NZT1
2078	CALML6	HGNC:24193; Q8TD86
2079	CALN1	HGNC:13248; Q9BXU9
2080	CALR	HGNC:1455; P27797
2081	CALR3	HGNC:20407; Q96L12
2082	CALU	HGNC:1458; O43852
2083	CALY	HGNC:17938; Q9NYX4
2084	CAMK1	HGNC:1459; Q14012
2085	CAMK1D	HGNC:19341; Q8IU85
2086	CAMK1G	HGNC:14585; Q96NX5
2087	CAMK2A	HGNC:1460; Q9UQM7
2088	CAMK2B	HGNC:1461; Q13554
2089	CAMK2D	HGNC:1462; Q13557
2090	CAMK2G	HGNC:1463; Q13555
2091	CAMK2N1	HGNC:24190; Q7Z7J9
2092	CAMK2N2	HGNC:24197; Q96S95
2093	CAMK4	HGNC:1464; Q16566
2094	CAMKK1	HGNC:1469; Q8N5S9
2095	CAMKK2	HGNC:1470; Q96RR4
2096	CAMKMT	HGNC:26276; Q7Z624
2097	CAMKV	HGNC:28788; Q8NCB2
2098	CAMLG	HGNC:1471; P49069
2099	CAMP	HGNC:1472; P49913
2100	CAMSAP1	HGNC:19946; Q5T5Y3
2101	CAMSAP2	HGNC:29188; Q08AD1
2102	CAMSAP3	HGNC:29307; Q9P1Y5
2103	CAMTA1	HGNC:18806; Q9Y6Y1
2104	CAMTA2	HGNC:18807; O94983
2105	CAND1	HGNC:30688; Q86VP6
2106	CAND2	HGNC:30689; O75155
2107	CANT1	HGNC:19721; Q8WVQ1
2108	CANX	HGNC:1473; P27824
2109	CAP1	HGNC:20040; Q01518
2110	CAP2	HGNC:20039; P40123
2111	CAPG	HGNC:1474; P40121
2112	CAPN1	HGNC:1476; P07384
2113	CAPN2	HGNC:1479; P17655
2114	CAPN3	HGNC:1480; P20807
2115	CAPN5	HGNC:1482; O15484
2116	CAPN6	HGNC:1483; Q9Y6Q1
2117	CAPN7	HGNC:1484; Q9Y6W3
2118	CAPN8	HGNC:1485; A6NHC0
2119	CAPN9	HGNC:1486; O14815
2120	CAPN10	HGNC:1477; Q9HC96
2121	CAPN11	HGNC:1478; Q9UMQ6
2122	CAPN12	HGNC:13249; Q6ZSI9
2123	CAPN13	HGNC:16663; Q6MZZ7
2124	CAPN14	HGNC:16664; A8MX76
2125	CAPN15	HGNC:11182; O75808
2126	CAPNS1	HGNC:1481; P04632
2127	CAPNS2	HGNC:16371; Q96L46
2128	CAPRIN1	HGNC:6743; Q14444
2129	CAPRIN2	HGNC:21259; Q6IMN6
2130	CAPS	HGNC:1487; Q13938
2131	CAPS2	HGNC:16471; Q9BXY5
2132	CAPSL	HGNC:28375; Q8WWF8
2133	CAPZA1	HGNC:1488; P52907
2134	CAPZA2	HGNC:1490; P47755
2135	CAPZA3	HGNC:24205; Q96KX2
2136	CAPZB	HGNC:1491; P47756
2137	CARD6	HGNC:16394; Q9BX69
2138	CARD8	HGNC:17057; Q9Y2G2
2139	CARD9	HGNC:16391; Q9H257
2140	CARD10	HGNC:16422; Q9BWT7
2141	CARD11	HGNC:16393; Q9BXL7
2142	CARD14	HGNC:16446; Q9BXL6
2143	CARD16	HGNC:33701; Q5EG05
2144	CARD18	HGNC:28861; P57730
2145	CARD19	HGNC:28148; Q96LW7
2146	CARF	HGNC:14435; Q8N187
2147	CARHSP1	HGNC:17150; Q9Y2V2
2148	CARM1	HGNC:23393; Q86X55
2149	CARMIL1	HGNC:21581; Q5VZK9
2150	CARMIL2	HGNC:27089; Q6F5E8
2151	CARMIL3	HGNC:20272; Q8ND23
2152	CARNMT1	HGNC:23435; Q8N4J0
2153	CARNS1	HGNC:29268; A5YM72
2154	CARS1	HGNC:1493; P49589
2155	CARS2	HGNC:25695; Q9HA77
2156	CARTPT	HGNC:24323; Q16568
2157	CASC3	HGNC:17040; O15234
2158	CASD1	HGNC:16014; Q96PB1
2159	CASK	HGNC:1497; O14936
2160	CASKIN1	HGNC:20879; Q8WXD9
2161	CASKIN2	HGNC:18200; Q8WXE0
2162	CASP1	HGNC:1499; P29466
2163	CASP2	HGNC:1503; P42575
2164	CASP3	HGNC:1504; P42574
2165	CASP4	HGNC:1505; P49662
2166	CASP5	HGNC:1506; P51878
2167	CASP6	HGNC:1507; P55212
2168	CASP7	HGNC:1508; P55210
2169	CASP8	HGNC:1509; Q14790
2170	CASP8AP2	HGNC:1510; Q9UKL3
2171	CASP9	HGNC:1511; P55211
2172	CASP10	HGNC:1500; Q92851
2173	CASP12	HGNC:19004; Q6UXS9
2174	CASP14	HGNC:1502; P31944
2175	CASQ1	HGNC:1512; P31415
2176	CASQ2	HGNC:1513; O14958
2177	CASR	HGNC:1514; P41180
2178	CASS4	HGNC:15878; Q9NQ75
2179	CAST	HGNC:1515; P20810
2180	CASTOR1	HGNC:34423; Q8WTX7
2181	CASTOR2	HGNC:37073; A6NHX0
2182	CASZ1	HGNC:26002; Q86V15
2183	CAT	HGNC:1516; P04040
2184	CATIP	HGNC:25062; Q7Z7H3
2185	CATSPER1	HGNC:17116; Q8NEC5
2186	CATSPER2	HGNC:18810; Q96P56
2187	CATSPER3	HGNC:20819; Q86XQ3
2188	CATSPER4	HGNC:23220; Q7RTX7
2189	CATSPERB	HGNC:20500; Q9H7T0
2190	CATSPERD	HGNC:28598; Q86XM0
2191	CATSPERE	HGNC:28491; Q5SY80
2192	CATSPERG	HGNC:25243; Q6ZRH7
2193	CATSPERH	HGNC:49389; E9PQX1
2194	CATSPERQ	HGNC:44155; Q2WGJ8
2195	CATSPERT	HGNC:14438; Q53TS8
2196	CATSPERZ	HGNC:19231; Q9NTU4
2197	CAV1	HGNC:1527; Q03135
2198	CAV2	HGNC:1528; P51636
2199	CAV3	HGNC:1529; P56539
2200	CAVIN1	HGNC:9688; Q6NZI2
2201	CAVIN2	HGNC:10690; O95810
2202	CAVIN3	HGNC:9400; Q969G5
2203	CAVIN4	HGNC:33742; Q5BKX8
2204	CBARP	HGNC:28617; Q8N350
2205	CBFA2T2	HGNC:1536; O43439
2206	CBFA2T3	HGNC:1537; O75081
2207	CBFB	HGNC:1539; Q13951
2208	CBL	HGNC:1541; P22681
2209	CBLB	HGNC:1542; Q13191
2210	CBLC	HGNC:15961; Q9ULV8
2211	CBLIF	HGNC:4268; P27352
2212	CBLL1	HGNC:21225; Q75N03
2213	CBLL2	HGNC:26371; Q8N7E2
2214	CBLN1	HGNC:1543; P23435
2215	CBLN2	HGNC:1544; Q8IUK8
2216	CBLN3	HGNC:20146; Q6UW01
2217	CBLN4	HGNC:16231; Q9NTU7
2218	CBR1	HGNC:1548; P16152
2219	CBR3	HGNC:1549; O75828
2220	CBR4	HGNC:25891; Q8N4T8
2221	CBS	HGNC:1550; P35520
2222	CBX1	HGNC:1551; P83916
2223	CBX2	HGNC:1552; Q14781
2224	CBX3	HGNC:1553; Q13185
2225	CBX4	HGNC:1554; O00257
2226	CBX5	HGNC:1555; P45973
2227	CBX6	HGNC:1556; O95503
2228	CBX7	HGNC:1557; O95931
2229	CBX8	HGNC:15962; Q9HC52
2230	CBY1	HGNC:1307; Q9Y3M2
2231	CBY2	HGNC:30720; Q8NA61
2232	CBY3	HGNC:33278; A6NI87
2233	CC2D1A	HGNC:30237; Q6P1N0
2234	CC2D1B	HGNC:29386; Q5T0F9
2235	CC2D2A	HGNC:29253; Q9P2K1
2236	CC2D2B	HGNC:31666; Q6DHV5
2237	CCAR1	HGNC:24236; Q8IX12
2238	CCAR2	HGNC:23360; Q8N163
2239	CCBE1	HGNC:29426; Q6UXH8
2240	CCDC3	HGNC:23813; Q9BQI4
2241	CCDC6	HGNC:18782; Q16204
2242	CCDC7	HGNC:26533; Q96M83
2243	CCDC8	HGNC:25367; Q9H0W5
2244	CCDC9	HGNC:24560; Q9Y3X0
2245	CCDC9B	HGNC:33488; Q6ZUT6
2246	CCDC12	HGNC:28332; Q8WUD4
2247	CCDC13	HGNC:26358; Q8IYE1
2248	CCDC14	HGNC:25766; Q49A88
2249	CCDC15	HGNC:25798; Q0P6D6
2250	CCDC17	HGNC:26574; Q96LX7
