= ALLC (disambiguation) =

ALLC may refer to:

- Association for Literary and Linguistic Computing, former name of the European Association for Digital Humanities
- Atticus Limited Liability Company, an LLC formed to support the Broadway production of To Kill a Mockingbird
- ALLC (gene), from List of human protein-coding genes 1
