= CATSPERD =

Protein in homo sapiens

Identifiers
- Aliases: CATSPERD, TMEM146, cation channel sperm associated auxiliary subunit delta
- External IDs: OMIM: 617490; MGI: 2147030; GeneCards: CATSPERD

Gene location (Human)
Chr.	Chromosome 19 (human)
Band	19p13.3	Start	5,720,637 bp
Band	19p13.3	End	5,778,734 bp

Gene location (Mouse)
Chr.	Chromosome 17 (mouse)
Band	17|17 D	Start	56,628,143 bp
Band	17|17 D	End	56,664,456 bp
RNA expression pattern
Bgee	Human / Mouse (ortholog); Top expressed in: bronchial epithelial cell; right uterine tube; oocyte; right testis; olfactory zone of nasal mucosa; mucosa of paranasal sinus; left testis; testicle; secondary oocyte; sperm / Top expressed in: spermatocyte; spermatid; seminiferous tubule; prostate; lobe of prostate; transitional epithelium of urinary bladder; morula; embryo; zygote; blastocyst; More reference expression data
BioGPS	n/a
Gene ontology
Molecular function	protein binding
Cellular component	integral component of membrane; plasma membrane; CatSper complex; cell projection; motile cilium; cilium; membrane; sperm principal piece
Biological process	multicellular organism development; cell differentiation; spermatogenesis; sperm-egg recognition; flagellated sperm motility; sperm capacitation; response to progesterone
Sources:Amigo / QuickGO
Orthologs
Databases	NCBI: entry; OMA: entry
Species	Human	Mouse
Entrez	257062	106757
Ensembl	ENSG00000174898	ENSMUSG00000040828
UniProt	Q86XM0	E9Q9F6
RefSeq (mRNA)	NM_152784	NM_175350; NM_001357897
RefSeq (protein)	NP_689997	NP_780559; NP_001344826
Location (UCSC)	Chr 19: 5.72 – 5.78 Mb	Chr 17: 56.63 – 56.66 Mb
PubMed search
- Wikidata
View/Edit Human	View/Edit Mouse

Cation channel sperm-associated auxiliary subunit delta is a protein in humans encoded by the CATSPERD gene.
