= CATSPERZ =

Protein in homo sapiens

Identifiers
- Aliases: CATSPERZ, C11orf20, TEX40, testis expressed 40, catsper channel auxiliary subunit zeta
- External IDs: OMIM: 617511; MGI: 1914327; GeneCards: CATSPERZ

Gene location (Human)
Chr.	Chromosome 11 (human)
Band	11q13.1	Start	64,300,358 bp
Band	11q13.1	End	64,304,770 bp

Gene location (Mouse)
Chr.	Chromosome 19 (mouse)
Band	19|19 A	Start	6,899,739 bp
Band	19|19 A	End	6,902,748 bp
RNA expression pattern
Bgee	Human / Mouse (ortholog); Top expressed in: left testis; right testis; testicle; cerebellar hemisphere; right hemisphere of cerebellum; temporal lobe; amygdala; right frontal lobe; hippocampus proper; anterior cingulate cortex / Top expressed in: spermatocyte; spermatid; testicle; embryo; morula; embryo; primary visual cortex; urinary bladder; Cortex of frontal lobe; superior frontal gyrus; More reference expression data
BioGPS	n/a
Orthologs
Databases	NCBI: entry; OMA: entry
Species	Human	Mouse
Entrez	25858	67077
Ensembl	ENSG00000219435	ENSMUSG00000050623
UniProt	Q9NTU4	Q9CQP8
RefSeq (mRNA)	NM_001039496	NM_001039494
RefSeq (protein)	NP_001034585	NP_001034583
Location (UCSC)	Chr 11: 64.3 – 64.3 Mb	Chr 19: 6.9 – 6.9 Mb
PubMed search
- Wikidata
View/Edit Human	View/Edit Mouse

Cation channel sperm-associated auxiliary subunit zeta is a protein in humans encoded by the CATSPERZ gene.
