= ADCK2 =

Protein-coding gene in humans

Identifiers
- Aliases: ADCK2, AARF, aarF domain containing kinase 2
- External IDs: MGI: 1889336; GeneCards: ADCK2

Gene location (Human)
Chr.	Chromosome 7 (human)
Band	7q34	Start	140,672,945 bp
Band	7q34	End	140,696,261 bp

Gene location (Mouse)
Chr.	Chromosome 6 (mouse)
Band	6|6 B1	Start	39,550,807 bp
Band	6|6 B1	End	39,565,703 bp
RNA expression pattern
Bgee	Human / Mouse (ortholog); Top expressed in: buccal mucosa cell; amniotic fluid; prefrontal cortex; mucosa of transverse colon; testicle; C1 segment; skin of leg; endothelial cell; skin of abdomen; nipple / Top expressed in: islet of Langerhans; neural layer of retina; hypothalamus; spleen; ovary; granulocyte; ganglionic eminence; thymus; renal cortex; striatum of neuraxis; More reference expression data
BioGPS	n/a
Gene ontology
Molecular function	transferase activity; nucleotide binding; protein serine/threonine kinase activity; ATP binding; kinase activity; protein binding
Cellular component	integral component of membrane; membrane
Biological process	protein phosphorylation; phosphorylation
Sources:Amigo / QuickGO
Orthologs
Databases	NCBI: entry; OMA: entry
Species	Human	Mouse
Entrez	90956	57869
Ensembl	ENSG00000133597	ENSMUSG00000046947
UniProt	Q7Z695	Q6NSR3
RefSeq (mRNA)	NM_052853	NM_178873
RefSeq (protein)	NP_443085	NP_849204
Location (UCSC)	Chr 7: 140.67 – 140.7 Mb	Chr 6: 39.55 – 39.57 Mb
PubMed search
- Wikidata
View/Edit Human	View/Edit Mouse

ADCK2 (aarF domain containing kinase 2) is an enzyme that in humans is encoded by the ADCK2 gene. It is situated on chromosome 7 at the q34 location.

== Function ==
ADCK2 is predicted to possess ATP binding activity and protein serine/threonine kinase activity. The protein is predicted to be an integral part of the membrane.

== Genomic context ==
The ADCK2 gene is located on chromosome 7q34. The genomic sequence spans 22,165 base pairs from 140,672,945 to 140,695,110 on the GRCh38.p14 primary assembly. It consists of 8 exons.

== Expression ==
ADCK2 is ubiquitously expressed across various human tissues, with notable expression in skin and brain tissue, among others.

== Clinical significance ==
Research indicates that ADCK2 may have therapeutic implications in diseases such as myopathy.
