= Small acidic protein =

Protein-coding gene in humans

C11orf58

Identifiers
- Aliases: C11orf58, IMAGE145052, SMAP, chromosome 11 open reading frame 58
- External IDs: MGI: 1929274; GeneCards: C11orf58

Gene location (Human)
Chr.	Chromosome 11 (human)
Band	11p15.2	Start	16,613,132 bp
Band	11p15.2	End	16,758,340 bp

Gene location (Mouse)
Chr.	Chromosome 7 (mouse)
Band	7|7 F1	Start	115,638,632 bp
Band	7|7 F1	End	115,704,445 bp
RNA expression pattern
Bgee	Human / Mouse (ortholog); Top expressed in: Achilles tendon; ganglionic eminence; islet of Langerhans; tibialis anterior muscle; monocyte; ventricular zone; gallbladder; appendix; smooth muscle tissue; endothelial cell / Top expressed in: ganglionic eminence; ventricular zone; neural tube; mesencephalon; epiblast; placenta; olfactory bulb; yolk sac; lens; ovary; More reference expression data
BioGPS	n/a
Gene ontology
Molecular function	molecular function
Cellular component	cellular component
Biological process	biological process
Sources:Amigo / QuickGO
Orthologs
Databases	NCBI: entry; OMA: entry
Species	Human	Mouse
Entrez	10944	56372
Ensembl	ENSG00000110696	ENSMUSG00000030663
UniProt	O00193	Q9R0P4
RefSeq (mRNA)	NM_001142705; NM_014267	NM_019772
RefSeq (protein)	NP_055082	NP_062746
Location (UCSC)	Chr 11: 16.61 – 16.76 Mb	Chr 7: 115.64 – 115.7 Mb
PubMed search
- Wikidata
View/Edit Human	View/Edit Mouse

Small acidic protein is a protein that in humans is encoded by the C11orf58 gene (also called SMAP).
