= CACUL1 =

Protein-coding gene in humans

Identifiers
- Aliases: CACUL1, C10orf46, CAC1, CDK2 associated cullin domain 1
- External IDs: MGI: 1926082; HomoloGene: 17821; GeneCards: CACUL1; OMA:CACUL1 - orthologs

Gene location (Human)
Chr.	Chromosome 10 (human)
Band	10q26.11	Start	118,674,167 bp
Band	10q26.11	End	118,755,249 bp

Gene location (Mouse)
Chr.	Chromosome 19 (mouse)
Band	19|19 D3	Start	60,513,134 bp
Band	19|19 D3	End	60,569,463 bp
RNA expression pattern
Bgee	Human / Mouse (ortholog); Top expressed in: skin of arm; epithelium of nasopharynx; cardiac muscle tissue of right atrium; amniotic fluid; gingival epithelium; pancreatic epithelial cell; endothelial cell; myocardium of left ventricle; germinal epithelium; parietal pleura / Top expressed in: spermatid; seminiferous tubule; tail of embryo; arcuate nucleus; median eminence; extensor digitorum longus muscle; cingulate gyrus; plantaris muscle; stroma of bone marrow; paraventricular nucleus of hypothalamus; More reference expression data
BioGPS	n/a
Gene ontology
Molecular function	protein binding; protein kinase binding; ubiquitin protein ligase binding; ubiquitin protein ligase activity
Cellular component	cullin-RING ubiquitin ligase complex
Biological process	cell cycle; ubiquitin-dependent protein catabolic process; positive regulation of cell population proliferation; positive regulation of protein kinase activity; G1/S transition of mitotic cell cycle; protein ubiquitination
Sources:Amigo / QuickGO
Orthologs
Species	Human	Mouse
Entrez	143384	78832
Ensembl	ENSG00000151893	ENSMUSG00000033417
UniProt	Q86Y37	Q8R0X2
RefSeq (mRNA)	NM_153810	NM_001172096; NM_001172097; NM_030197
RefSeq (protein)	NP_722517	NP_001165567; NP_001165568; NP_084473
Location (UCSC)	Chr 10: 118.67 – 118.76 Mb	Chr 19: 60.51 – 60.57 Mb
PubMed search
- Wikidata
View/Edit Human	View/Edit Mouse

CDK2 associated cullin domain 1 is a protein that in humans is encoded by the CACUL1 gene.
