= ASTE1 =

Protein-coding gene in humans

Identifiers
- Aliases: ASTE1, HT001, asteroid homolog 1 (Drosophila), asteroid homolog 1
- External IDs: MGI: 1913845; GeneCards: ASTE1

Gene location (Human)
Chr.	Chromosome 3 (human)
Band	3q22.1	Start	131,013,875 bp
Band	3q22.1	End	131,027,649 bp

Gene location (Mouse)
Chr.	Chromosome 9 (mouse)
Band	9|9 F1	Start	105,272,591 bp
Band	9|9 F1	End	105,289,428 bp
RNA expression pattern
Bgee	Human / Mouse (ortholog); Top expressed in: sperm; testicle; granulocyte; Achilles tendon; rectum; mucosa of transverse colon; blood; jejunal mucosa; ventricular zone; bone marrow cell / Top expressed in: spermatid; spermatocyte; seminiferous tubule; genital tubercle; tail of embryo; zygote; secondary oocyte; morula; ventricular zone; right kidney; More reference expression data
BioGPS	n/a
Orthologs
Databases	NCBI: entry; OMA: entry
Species	Human	Mouse
Entrez	28990	66595
Ensembl	ENSG00000034533	ENSMUSG00000032567
UniProt	Q2TB18	Q8BIR2
RefSeq (mRNA)	NM_001288950; NM_014065	NM_001164828; NM_025651; NM_001357902
RefSeq (protein)	NP_001275879; NP_054784; NP_001275879.1	NP_001158300; NP_079927; NP_001344831
Location (UCSC)	Chr 3: 131.01 – 131.03 Mb	Chr 9: 105.27 – 105.29 Mb
PubMed search
- Wikidata
View/Edit Human	View/Edit Mouse

Single-strand DNA endonuclease ASTE1 is a protein that in humans is encoded by the ASTE1 gene. The gene is also known as HT001.
