= C11orf87 =

Protein-coding gene in the species Homo sapiens

Identifiers
- Aliases: C11orf87, LOH11CR1A, NEURIM1, chromosome 11 open reading frame 87
- External IDs: MGI: 2143099; HomoloGene: 52281; GeneCards: C11orf87; OMA:C11orf87 - orthologs

Gene location (Human)
Chr.	Chromosome 11 (human)
Band	11q22.3	Start	109,422,190 bp
Band	11q22.3	End	109,429,167 bp

Gene location (Mouse)
Chr.	Chromosome 9 (mouse)
Band	9|9 A5.3	Start	52,584,342 bp
Band	9|9 A5.3	End	52,591,080 bp
RNA expression pattern
Bgee	Human / Mouse (ortholog); Top expressed in: endothelial cell; lateral nuclear group of thalamus; Brodmann area 23; Brodmann area 46; primary visual cortex; middle temporal gyrus; prefrontal cortex; superior frontal gyrus; dorsolateral prefrontal cortex; Brodmann area 9 / Top expressed in: lateral geniculate nucleus; medial dorsal nucleus; primary motor cortex; medial geniculate nucleus; pontine nuclei; olfactory tubercle; otolith organ; utricle; lateral septal nucleus; prefrontal cortex; More reference expression data
BioGPS	n/a
Orthologs
Species	Human	Mouse
Entrez	399947	330941
Ensembl	ENSG00000185742	ENSMUSG00000078307
UniProt	Q6NUJ2	Q32M26
RefSeq (mRNA)	NM_207645	NM_001286641; NM_177907; NM_178906
RefSeq (protein)	NP_997528	NP_001273570; NP_849237
Location (UCSC)	Chr 11: 109.42 – 109.43 Mb	Chr 9: 52.58 – 52.59 Mb
PubMed search
- Wikidata
View/Edit Human	View/Edit Mouse

Chromosome 11 open reading frame 87 is a protein that in humans is encoded by the C11orf87 gene.
