= C14orf180 =

Protein-coding gene in the species Homo sapiens

Identifiers
- Aliases: C14orf180, C14orf77, NRAC, chromosome 14 open reading frame 180
- External IDs: MGI: 2443020; HomoloGene: 52221; GeneCards: C14orf180; OMA:C14orf180 - orthologs

Gene location (Human)
Chr.	Chromosome 14 (human)
Band	14q32.33	Start	104,579,764 bp
Band	14q32.33	End	104,590,515 bp

Gene location (Mouse)
Chr.	Chromosome 12 (mouse)
Band	12|12 F1	Start	112,455,882 bp
Band	12|12 F1	End	112,466,361 bp
RNA expression pattern
Bgee	Human / Mouse (ortholog); Top expressed in: apex of heart; right auricle of heart; left ventricle; subcutaneous adipose tissue; right coronary artery; left coronary artery; muscle of thigh; lactiferous gland; right adrenal cortex; gastrocnemius muscle / Top expressed in: interventricular septum; brown adipose tissue; white adipose tissue; subcutaneous adipose tissue; tunica adventitia of aorta; myocardium of ventricle; embryo; intercostal muscle; tunica media of zone of aorta; endocardial cushion; More reference expression data
BioGPS	n/a
Orthologs
Species	Human	Mouse
Entrez	400258	319942
Ensembl	ENSG00000274126; ENSG00000184601	ENSMUSG00000043122
UniProt	Q8N912	Q8BNX7
RefSeq (mRNA)	NM_001008404; NM_001286399; NM_001286400	NM_177039
RefSeq (protein)	NP_001008404; NP_001273328; NP_001273329	NP_796013
Location (UCSC)	Chr 14: 104.58 – 104.59 Mb	Chr 12: 112.46 – 112.47 Mb
PubMed search
- Wikidata
View/Edit Human	View/Edit Mouse

C14orf180 is found on chromosome 14 in humans: 14q32.33. It consists of 1832 bp and 160 amino acids post translation. There is a total number of 6 exons. C14orf180 is also known as NRAC, C14orf77, and Chromosome 14 Open Reading Frame 180.

== Isoforms ==
C14orf180 has two known isoforms.

Transcript	Accession number	Length
Isoform X1	XP_005267694	177aa
Isoform X2	XP_375108	160aa

== Protein ==
=== General properties ===
C14orf180 protein consists of 160 amino acids. C14orf180 has a predicted molecular weight of 18.1 kD. It also has a predicted unmodified isoelectric point of 11 pI.

=== Secondary Sequence ===
The predicted secondary structure was determined by a cross- program analysis. The results showed three alpha-helices and two-beta sheets. Which, was also predicted in some mammals.

== Regulation ==
=== Gene level regulation ===
Overall, C14orf180 is moderately expressed in adipose tissue, hear tissue, and skeletal muscle. Slight expression is seen in a wide range of tissues as well. In fetal development expression is highest in the heart tissue through 11-20 weeks, with a peak at 18 weeks.

== Homology ==
=== Paralogs ===
There are no known paralogs of the C14orf180 gene.

=== Orthologs ===
The C14orf180 gene is found in jawed vertebrates, and is highly conserved in mammals. Some examples are listed below.

Genius & species	Common name	Accession number	Length	Sequence Identity	Sequence Similarity	Date of Divergence
Homo sapiens	Human	AAH41103	160	100%	100%	0 MYA
Pan paniscus	Bonobo	XP_003807050.1	160	98.80%	98.80%	6.7 MYA
Mus Musculus	House Mouse	NP_796013.1	165	48.20%	57.60%	90 MYA
Bos taurus	Cattle	NP_001192317.1	159	61.20%	71.20%	96 MYA
Dormaius novaehollandiae	Emu	XP_025968311	136	25.40%	37.90%	312 MYA

== Function ==
The C14orf180 is predicted to be involved in low- density lipoprotein particle protein clearance; however, the function is yet to be well understood by the scientific community.

== Clinical significance ==
The clinical significance of the C14orf180 gene is yet to be well understood by the scientific community. However, the expression of C14orf180 in skeletal muscle was studied in young males or females compared to old male or females and no significant change was found. C14orf180 was studied in children with obesity, no change expression was found compared to children without obesity.
