= ADCK5 =

Protein-coding gene in humans

Identifiers
- Aliases: ADCK5, aarF domain containing kinase 5
- External IDs: MGI: 2679274; GeneCards: ADCK5

Gene location (Human)
Chr.	Chromosome 8 (human)
Band	8q24.3	Start	144,373,101 bp
Band	8q24.3	End	144,393,242 bp

Gene location (Mouse)
Chr.	Chromosome 15 (mouse)
Band	15|15 D3	Start	76,460,558 bp
Band	15|15 D3	End	76,480,016 bp
RNA expression pattern
Bgee	Human / Mouse (ortholog); Top expressed in: mucosa of transverse colon; duodenum; right hemisphere of cerebellum; granulocyte; right adrenal cortex; left adrenal cortex; gonad; right lobe of liver; spleen; apex of heart / Top expressed in: adrenal gland; jejunum; duodenum; left lobe of liver; seminal vesicula; blastocyst; large intestine; colon; yolk sac; lip; More reference expression data
BioGPS	n/a
Gene ontology
Molecular function	transferase activity; protein serine/threonine kinase activity; protein binding; kinase activity
Cellular component	integral component of membrane; membrane
Biological process	protein phosphorylation; phosphorylation
Sources:Amigo / QuickGO
Orthologs
Databases	NCBI: entry; OMA: entry
Species	Human	Mouse
Entrez	203054	268822
Ensembl	ENSG00000173137; ENSG00000285451	ENSMUSG00000022550
UniProt	Q3MIX3	Q80V03
RefSeq (mRNA)	NM_174922	NM_172960
RefSeq (protein)	NP_777582	NP_766548
Location (UCSC)	Chr 8: 144.37 – 144.39 Mb	Chr 15: 76.46 – 76.48 Mb
PubMed search
- Wikidata
View/Edit Human	View/Edit Mouse

ADCK5 (aarF domain containing kinase 5) is an enzyme that in humans is encoded by the ADCK5 gene. It is situated on chromosome 8 at the q24.3 location.

== Function ==
ADCK5 is predicted to possess protein serine/threonine kinase activity and to be an integral component of the membrane.

== Genomic context ==
The ADCK5 gene is located on chromosome 8q24.3. The genomic sequence spans 20,154 base pairs from 144,373,088 to 144,393,242 on the GRCh38.p14 primary assembly. It consists of 19 exons.

== Expression ==
ADCK5 is ubiquitously expressed across various human tissues, with notable expression in the duodenum and small intestine, among others.

== Clinical significance ==
Research indicates that ADCK5 may have therapeutic implications in lung cancer.
