= Chromosome 19 open reading frame 33 =

Protein found in humans

C19orf33

Identifiers
- Aliases: C19orf33, H2RSP, IMUP, IMUP-1, IMUP-2, chromosome 19 open reading frame 33
- External IDs: MGI: 1919525; HomoloGene: 137645; GeneCards: C19orf33; OMA:C19orf33 - orthologs

Gene location (Human)
Chr.	Chromosome 19 (human)
Band	19q13.2	Start	38,304,164 bp
Band	19q13.2	End	38,305,006 bp

Gene location (Mouse)
Chr.	Chromosome 7 (mouse)
Band	7|7 B1	Start	28,945,986 bp
Band	7|7 B1	End	28,947,891 bp
RNA expression pattern
Bgee	Human / Mouse (ortholog); Top expressed in: mucosa of transverse colon; olfactory zone of nasal mucosa; skin of abdomen; skin of leg; duodenum; right uterine tube; upper lobe of left lung; minor salivary glands; rectum; right lung / Top expressed in: duodenum; left colon; ileum; yolk sac; jejunum; transitional epithelium of urinary bladder; stomach; epithelium of stomach; migratory enteric neural crest cell; left lobe of liver; More reference expression data
BioGPS	n/a
Gene ontology
Molecular function	double-stranded DNA binding; single-stranded DNA binding
Cellular component	nucleus; cytosol; plasma membrane
Biological process	biological process
Sources:Amigo / QuickGO
Orthologs
Species	Human	Mouse
Entrez	64073	72275
Ensembl	ENSG00000167644	ENSMUSG00000030587
UniProt	Q9GZP8	Q9D809
RefSeq (mRNA)	NM_033520; NM_022125; NM_001317801	NM_028179
RefSeq (protein)	NP_001304730; NP_277055	NP_082455
Location (UCSC)	Chr 19: 38.3 – 38.31 Mb	Chr 7: 28.95 – 28.95 Mb
PubMed search
- Wikidata
View/Edit Human	View/Edit Mouse

Chromosome 19 open reading frame 33 is a protein that in humans is encoded by the C19orf33 gene.

== Function ==
The protein encoded by this gene has been shown to be upregulated in SV40-immortalized fibroblasts as well as in endometrial carcinoma cells. The encoded protein is found primarily in the nucleus. This protein may play a role in placental development and diseases such as pre-eclampsia. Two transcript variants encoding different isoforms have been found for this gene. [provided by RefSeq, Dec 2015].
