= C1orf35 =

Protein-coding gene in humans

An Error has occurred retrieving Wikidata item for infobox

Multiple myeloma tumor-associated protein 2 is a protein in humans that is encoded by the C1orf35 gene.
