= CATSPERG =

Protein in homo sapiens

Identifiers
- Aliases: CATSPERG, C19orf15, cation channel sperm associated auxiliary subunit gamma
- External IDs: OMIM: 613452; MGI: 1923968; GeneCards: CATSPERG

Gene location (Human)
Chr.	Chromosome 19 (human)
Band	19q13.2	Start	38,335,775 bp
Band	19q13.2	End	38,370,943 bp

Gene location (Mouse)
Chr.	Chromosome 7 (mouse)
Band	7|7 B1	Start	29,396,644 bp
Band	7|7 B1	End	29,426,457 bp
RNA expression pattern
Bgee	Human / Mouse (ortholog); Top expressed in: left testis; right testis; sperm; right hemisphere of cerebellum; sural nerve; gonad; right lobe of thyroid gland; testicle; granulocyte; left lobe of thyroid gland / Top expressed in: spermatocyte; spermatid; blastocyst; embryo; testicle; bone marrow; islet of Langerhans; exocrine gland; liver; seminiferous tubule; More reference expression data
BioGPS	n/a
Orthologs
Databases	NCBI: entry; OMA: entry
Species	Human	Mouse
Entrez	57828	76718
Ensembl	ENSG00000099338	ENSMUSG00000049123
UniProt	Q6ZRH7	C6KI89
RefSeq (mRNA)	NM_021185; NM_001330496	NM_029714
RefSeq (protein)	NP_001317425; NP_067008	NP_083990
Location (UCSC)	Chr 19: 38.34 – 38.37 Mb	Chr 7: 29.4 – 29.43 Mb
PubMed search
- Wikidata
View/Edit Human	View/Edit Mouse

Cation channel sperm-associated auxiliary subunit gamma is a protein in humans encoded by the CATSPERG gene.
