= ADCK1 =

Enzyme found in humans

Identifiers
- Aliases: ADCK1, aarF domain containing kinase 1
- External IDs: OMIM: 620399; MGI: 1919363; GeneCards: ADCK1

Gene location (Human)
Chr.	Chromosome 14 (human)
Band	14q24.3	Start	77,800,109 bp
Band	14q24.3	End	77,935,014 bp

Gene location (Mouse)
Chr.	Chromosome 12 (mouse)
Band	12|12 D2- D3	Start	88,327,324 bp
Band	12|12 D2- D3	End	88,428,494 bp
RNA expression pattern
Bgee	Human / Mouse (ortholog); Top expressed in: apex of heart; skin of arm; gastrocnemius muscle; myocardium of left ventricle; gonad; muscle of thigh; ventral tegmental area; deltoid muscle; granulocyte; inferior ganglion of vagus nerve / Top expressed in: saccule; otic placode; otic vesicle; spermatocyte; muscle of thigh; right kidney; spermatid; dentate gyrus of hippocampal formation granule cell; superior frontal gyrus; primary visual cortex; More reference expression data
BioGPS	n/a
Gene ontology
Molecular function	protein serine/threonine kinase activity; ATP binding; kinase activity; nucleotide binding; transferase activity; protein binding
Cellular component	extracellular region
Biological process	protein phosphorylation; phosphorylation
Sources:Amigo / QuickGO
Orthologs
Databases	NCBI: entry; OMA: entry
Species	Human	Mouse
Entrez	57143	72113
Ensembl	ENSG00000063761	ENSMUSG00000021044
UniProt	Q86TW2	Q9D0L4
RefSeq (mRNA)	NM_001142545; NM_020421; NM_001366485; NM_001366486; NM_001366487 NM_001366488; NM_001366489; NM_001366490	NM_001277296; NM_001277297; NM_028105; NM_001361598; NM_001361599 NM_001361600; NM_001361601
RefSeq (protein)	NP_001136017; NP_065154; NP_001353414; NP_001353415; NP_001353416 NP_001353417; NP_001353418; NP_001353419	NP_001264225; NP_001264226; NP_082381; NP_001348527; NP_001348528 NP_001348529; NP_001348530
Location (UCSC)	Chr 14: 77.8 – 77.94 Mb	Chr 12: 88.33 – 88.43 Mb
PubMed search
- Wikidata
View/Edit Human	View/Edit Mouse

ADCK1 (aarF domain containing kinase 1) is an enzyme that in humans is encoded by the ADCK1 gene. It is situated on chromosome 14 at the q24.3 location.

== Function ==
ADCK1 is predicted to possess ATP binding activity and protein serine/threonine kinase activity. It is involved in the negative regulation of mitochondrial fusion and the positive regulation of cristae formation within mitochondria. The protein is thought to be located predominantly in the mitochondrial inner membrane and may act as an integral component of the mitochondrial membrane.

== Genomic context ==
The ADCK1 gene is located on chromosome 14q24.3. The genomic sequence spans 134,905 base pairs from 77,800,109 to 77,935,014 on the GRCh38.p14 primary assembly. It consists of 17 exons.

== Expression ==
ADCK1 is ubiquitously expressed across various human tissues, with notable expression in the brain and thyroid, among others.

== Clinical significance ==
Research indicates that ADCK1 may have therapeutic implications in diseases such as osteosarcoma and colon cancer. It has been observed to activate the beta-catenin/TCF signaling pathway, to promote the growth and migration of cancer cells.
