= BHLHA9 =

Protein-coding gene in humans

Identifiers
- Aliases: BHLHA9, BHLHF42, basic helix-loop-helix family member a9, CCSPD
- External IDs: OMIM: 615416; MGI: 2444198; GeneCards: BHLHA9

Gene location (Human)
Chr.	Chromosome 17 (human)
Band	17p13.3	Start	1,270,444 bp
Band	17p13.3	End	1,271,815 bp

Gene location (Mouse)
Chr.	Chromosome 11 (mouse)
Band	11|11 B5	Start	76,563,296 bp
Band	11|11 B5	End	76,564,502 bp
RNA expression pattern
Bgee	Human / Mouse (ortholog); Top expressed in: gonad; Brodmann area 9; prefrontal cortex; right frontal lobe; primary visual cortex; superior frontal gyrus; anterior cingulate cortex; hypothalamus; temporal lobe; amygdala / Top expressed in: spinal ganglia; lip; female urethra; embryo; embryo; dentate gyrus of hippocampal formation granule cell; tail of embryo; skin of limb; autopod skin; skin of abdomen; More reference expression data
BioGPS	n/a
Gene ontology
Molecular function	DNA binding; protein binding; protein dimerization activity; protein heterodimerization activity; DNA-binding transcription factor activity, RNA polymerase II-specific
Cellular component	cytoplasm; nucleus
Biological process	multicellular organism development; regulation of transcription, DNA-templated; transcription, DNA-templated; regulation of transcription by RNA polymerase II
Sources:Amigo / QuickGO
Orthologs
Databases	NCBI: entry; OMA: entry
Species	Human	Mouse
Entrez	727857	320522
Ensembl	ENSG00000205899	ENSMUSG00000044243
UniProt	Q7RTU4	Q5RJB0
RefSeq (mRNA)	NM_001164405	NM_177182
RefSeq (protein)	NP_001157877	NP_796156
Location (UCSC)	Chr 17: 1.27 – 1.27 Mb	Chr 11: 76.56 – 76.56 Mb
PubMed search
- Wikidata
View/Edit Human	View/Edit Mouse

Basic helix-loop-helix family, member a9 is a protein in humans that is encoded by the BHLHA9 gene. This protein is a transcription factor that is involved in the development of limbs through regulating genes related to limb morphogenesis.
