= BTBD16 =

Gene on human chromosome 10

Identifiers
- Aliases: BTBD16, C10orf87, BTB domain containing 16
- External IDs: MGI: 3045247; GeneCards: BTBD16

Gene location (Human)
Chr.	Chromosome 10 (human)
Band	10q26.13	Start	122,271,296 bp
Band	10q26.13	End	122,338,159 bp

Gene location (Mouse)
Chr.	Chromosome 7 (mouse)
Band	7|7 F3	Start	130,375,799 bp
Band	7|7 F3	End	130,427,629 bp
RNA expression pattern
Bgee	Human / Mouse (ortholog); Top expressed in: testicle; C1 segment; skin of leg; urinary bladder; skin of abdomen; right lobe of liver; left testis; right testis; putamen; amygdala / Top expressed in: spermatid; spermatocyte; testicle; embryo; ovary; placenta; bone marrow; hippocampus proper; dentate gyrus of hippocampal formation granule cell; adrenal gland; More reference expression data
BioGPS	n/a
Orthologs
Databases	NCBI: entry; OMA: entry
Species	Human	Mouse
Entrez	118663	330660
Ensembl	ENSG00000138152	ENSMUSG00000040298
UniProt	Q32M84	E9Q173
RefSeq (mRNA)	NM_144587; NM_001318189	NM_001081038; NM_001374628
RefSeq (protein)	NP_001305118; NP_653188	NP_001074507; NP_001361557
Location (UCSC)	Chr 10: 122.27 – 122.34 Mb	Chr 7: 130.38 – 130.43 Mb
PubMed search
- Wikidata
View/Edit Human	View/Edit Mouse

BTB Domain-containing 16 (BTBD16) is a protein which in humans is encoded by the BTBD16 gene. The primary alias is chromosome 10 open reading frame 87 (c10orf87), but this is less commonly used than BTBD16.

== Gene ==
In the human genome, BTBD16 is located on the plus strand of chromosome 10 at 10q26.13. The sequence spans 66,682 base pairs and contains 16 exons. There are two main regions within the BTBD16 protein: the Broad-Complex, Tramtrack, and Bric a brac (BTB) and poxvirus and zinc finger (POZ) domain (BTB/POZ) and the BTB and C-terminal Kelch (BACK) domain.

=== Expression ===
BTBD16 is expressed at low levels across all tissues in the human body. Highest expression is within the brain, spinal cord, and liver, though these are each still expressed below the 50th percentile compared to other human proteins. There is also marginally higher expression within the urinary bladder and testes at 4.5 RPKM and 2.5 RPKM, respectively, though at lower confidence.

== mRNA ==
There are 7 known splice variants in humans, with transcript variant 1 having the longest nucleotide length at 1859 nucleotides and encoding the longest isoform, protein isoform A, at 507 amino acids.

Homo sapiens BTBD16 Transcript Variants and Protein Isoforms
Transcript Variant	Accession #	Nucleotide Length	Protein Isoform	Accession #	Amino Acid Length
1	NM_001318189.3	1859	a	NP_001305118.1	507
2	NM_144587.5	1856	b	NP_653188.2	506
X1	XM_011539239.3	1739	X1	XP_011537541.1	467
X2	XM_011539240.3	1715	X2	XP_011537542.1	459
X3	XM_011539241.3	1658	X3	XP_011537543.1	440
X4	XM_011539242.3	1538	X4	XP_011537544.1	400
X5	XM_017015637.2	2563	X5	XP_016871126.1	338

=== Regulation ===
There are few noted regulation sites within transcript variant 1:

- upstream in-frame stop codon ("taa" at location 244–246)
- poly-A signal sequence ("aataaa" at location 1839–1844)
- poly-A site ("a" at location 1859)

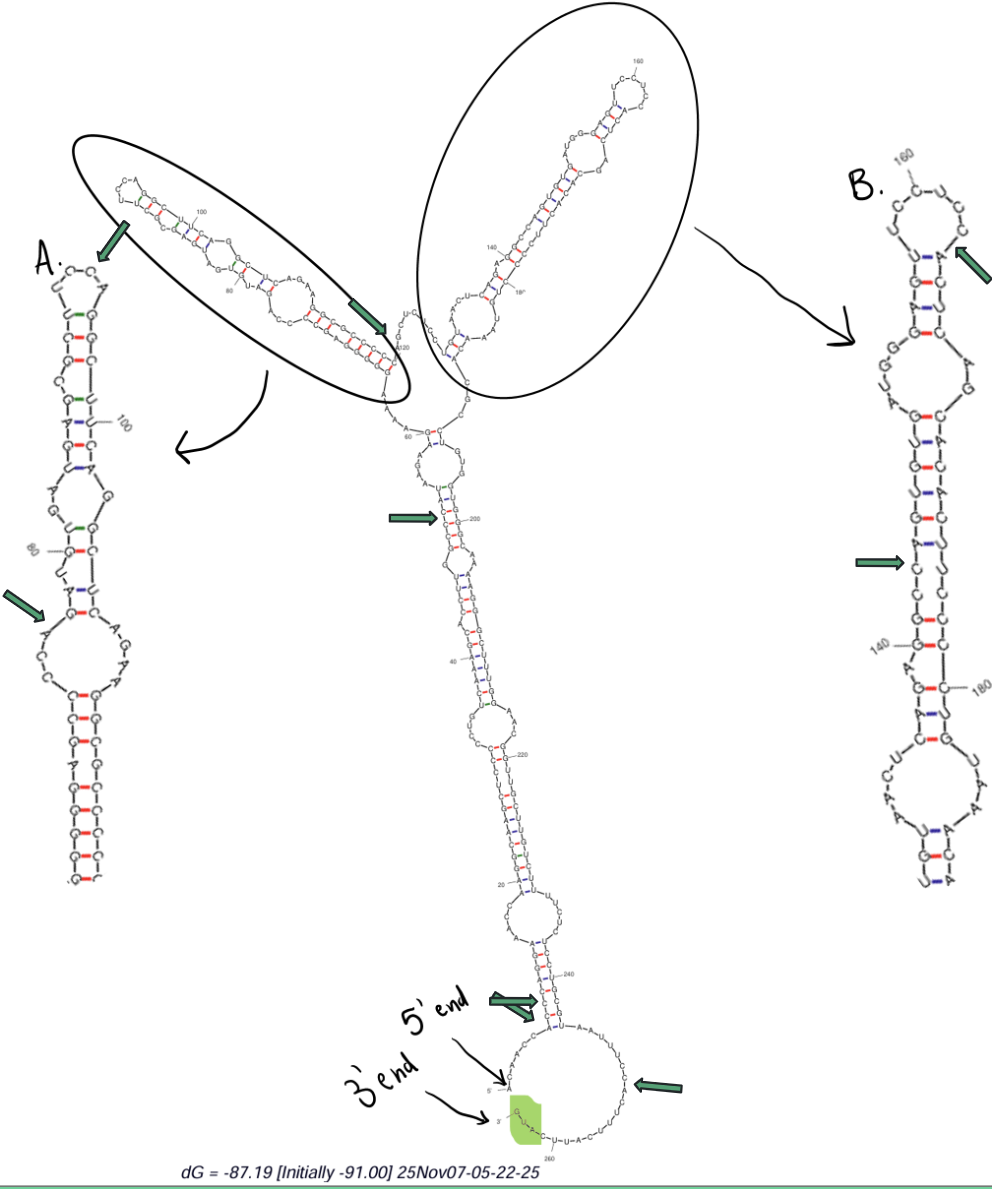
Homo sapiens BTBD16 5' UTR Predicted Structure. Green arrows point to sites of binding for RBMX.

The 5' untranslated region (UTR) creates a Y-like shape and likely has 9 sites of binding for RNA Binding Motif Protein, X-chromosome (RBMX). This gene is implicated in regulating tissue-specific gene expression.

== Protein ==
BTBD16 protein isoform A contains 507 amino acids and has a molecular weight of approximately 58.5 kDa. There is a marginally higher composition of phenylalanine (F) within this protein than the average human protein. Otherwise, there are no notable charged domains or transmembrane segments. It has an isoelectric point of 9.3, meaning it will be positively charged in the general cell environment.

=== Localization ===
BTBD16 protein isoform A has a nuclear localization sequence (NLS) of PKKTKEK, meaning it can localize within the nucleus of the cell. It is also predicted to localize within the cytosol and/or the mitochondria, all of which are consistent with predicted protein interactions.

=== Structure ===
There are 20 alpha helices and 15 beta strands within the structure of this protein. Most models for BTBD16 are based on Kelch-like proteins and BTB domain-containing regions and Kelch domains within proteins that are more studied than this one. This further confirms the presences of the BTB and BACK domains within the BTBD16 gene and protein.

=== Motifs and modification sites ===
There are few high scoring post-translational modification sites within the main isoform of BTBD16:

- LIG_FAT_LD1: part of the paxillin leucine-rich repeat motif family; recognized by focal adhesion proteins involved in regulation of the cytoskeleton.
- LIG_PAM2_1: peptide ligand binding motif; binds to domain found in polyA-binding proteins and E3 ubiquitin ligases.
- DOC_MAPK_FxFP_2 : helps regulate the mitogen-activated protein kinase pathway (MAPK), transferring cell signals from external stimuli to internal responses.

There are 22 high scoring protein kinase C (PKC) sites within BTBD16 as well.

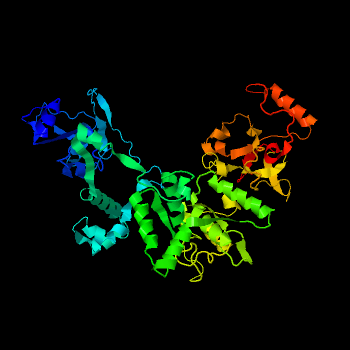
Structural Model of Homo sapiens BTBD16 from I-TASSER. Colored N-terminus in darkest blue to C-terminus in darkest red.

=== Protein interactions ===
BTBD16 may interact with multiple different proteins. It is co-expressed with both pleckstrin homology domain-containing family A member 1 (PLEKHA1) and transforming acidic coiled-coil-containing protein 16 (TACC2). These two genes are directly down and upstream of BTBD16, respectively.

Proteins found to interact with BTBD16 through two-hybrid experiments are PAX-interacting protein 1 (PAXIP1) and rhophilin associated tail protein 1 (ROPN1).

Other proteins mentioned in papers alongside BTBD16 are coiled-coil domain containing 191 (CCDC191), DPY19L3, age-related maculopathy susceptibility 2 (ARMS2), and NADH dehydrogenase complex I assembly factor 6 (NDUFAF6).

=== Evolution ===
BTBD16 has been found in species as far back as cartilaginous fishes, but not jawless fish, invertebrates, or bacteria.

Select Orthologs of Homo sapiens BTBD16
Organism	Common Name	Taxonomic Group	Date of Divergence (MYA)	Accession Number	Sequence Length (aa)	Sequence Identity (%)	Sequence Similarity (%)
Homo sapiens	Human	Primates	0	NP_001305118.1	507	100	100
Pongo abelii	Sumatran Orangutan	Primates	15	XP_024109654.3	507	97	98
Macaca fascicularis	Crab-eating macaque	Primates	29	XP_065377624.1	505	91	94
Mus musculus	Mouse	Rodentia	87	XP_036009074.1	522	70	83
Monodelphis domestica	Gray Short-tailed Opossum	Didelphimorphia	160	XP_016288166.1	517	56	68
Tachyglossus aculeatus	Short-beaked Echidna	Monotremata	180	XP_038614241.1	561	47	62
Aquila chrysaetos chrysaetos	Golden Eagle	Accipitridae	319	XP_029886573.1	210	55	68
Athene cunicularia	Burrowing Owl	Stringformes	319	XP_026707353.1	140	52	61
Mauremys mutica	Yellow Pond Turtle	Testudines	319	XP_044880231.1	506	51	69
Podarcis muralis	Common Wall Lizard	Squamata	319	XP_028584296.1	617	46	62
Varanus komodoensis	Komodo Dragon	Squamata	319	XP_044306495.1	615	45	61
Candoia aspera	Papuan Ground Boa	Squamata	319	XP_063163358.1	615	43	60
Ambystoma mexicanum	Axolotl	Urodela	352	XP_069468080.1	625	41	57
Geotrypetes seraphini	Gabon Caecilian	Gymnophiona	352	XP_033798618.1	582	38	53
Erpetoichthys calabaricus	Reedfish	Polypteriformes	429	XP_028648400.2	333	42	68
Polyodon spathula	American Sawfish	Acipenseriformes	429	XP_041123341.1	598	38	55
Hypanus sabinus	Atlantic Stingray	Myliobatiformes	462	XP_059803758.1	509	37	58
Callorhinchus milli	Elephant Shark	Chimaeriformes	462	XP_042192794.1	624	36	53
Amblyraja radiata	Thorny Skate	Rajiformes	462	XP_032890644.1	543	34	54

== Clinical significance ==
Various studies, mainly Genome Wide Association Studies (GWAS), note variants in the BTBD16 in association with type 2 diabetes, bipolar disorder, Alzheimer's disease, and multiple cancers like bladder and breast.

There are no known malignant variations within the BTBD16 gene specifically that are of clinical significance. One single nucleotide polymorphism (SNP) has been labeled as a variant of unknown significance (VUS) in correlation with malignant prostate tumor. This is a missense mutation in proline 29 that becomes a serine.

== Conceptual translation ==
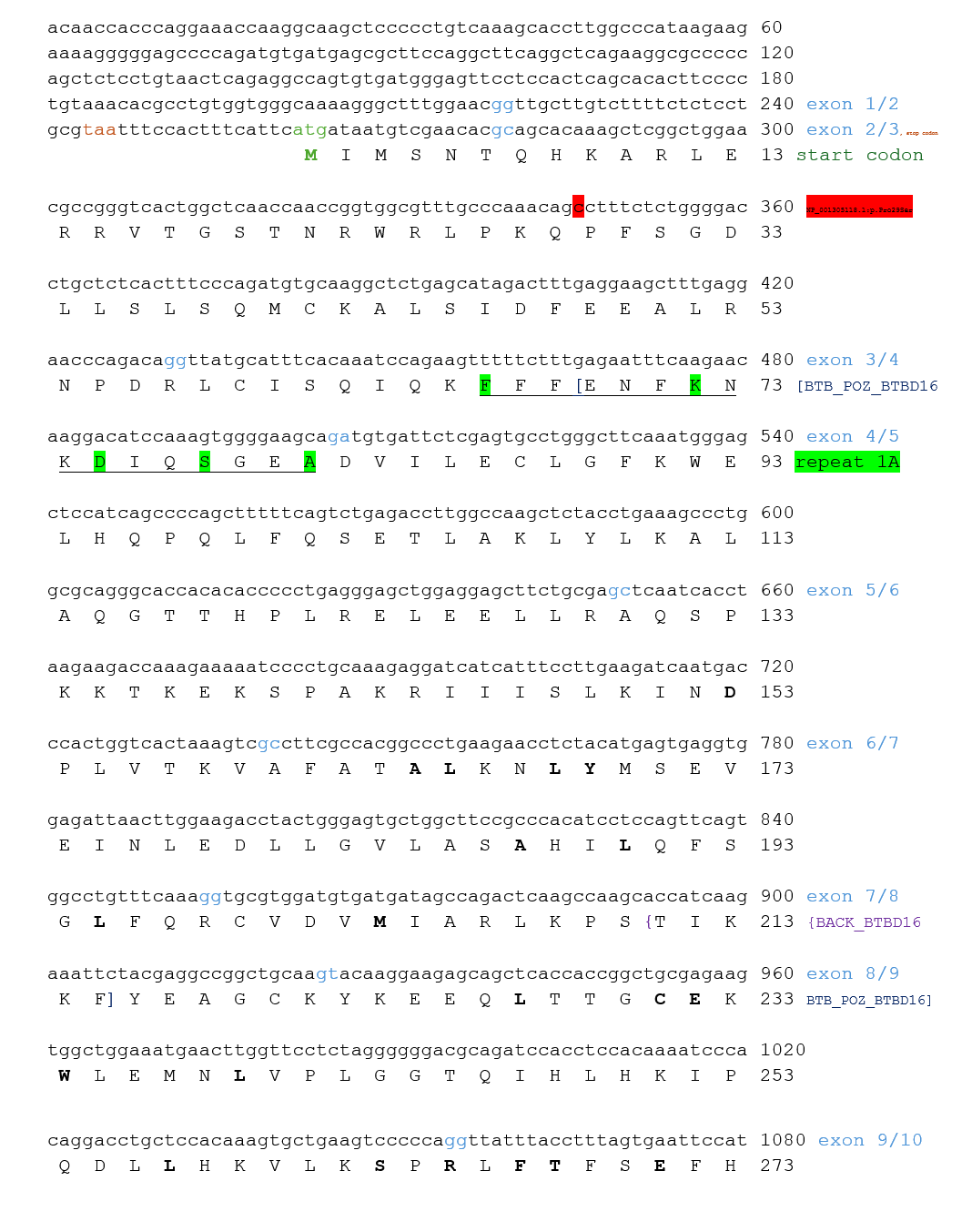
First half of Homo sapiens BTBD16 conceptual translation. Includes 5'UTR and amino acids 1–273.

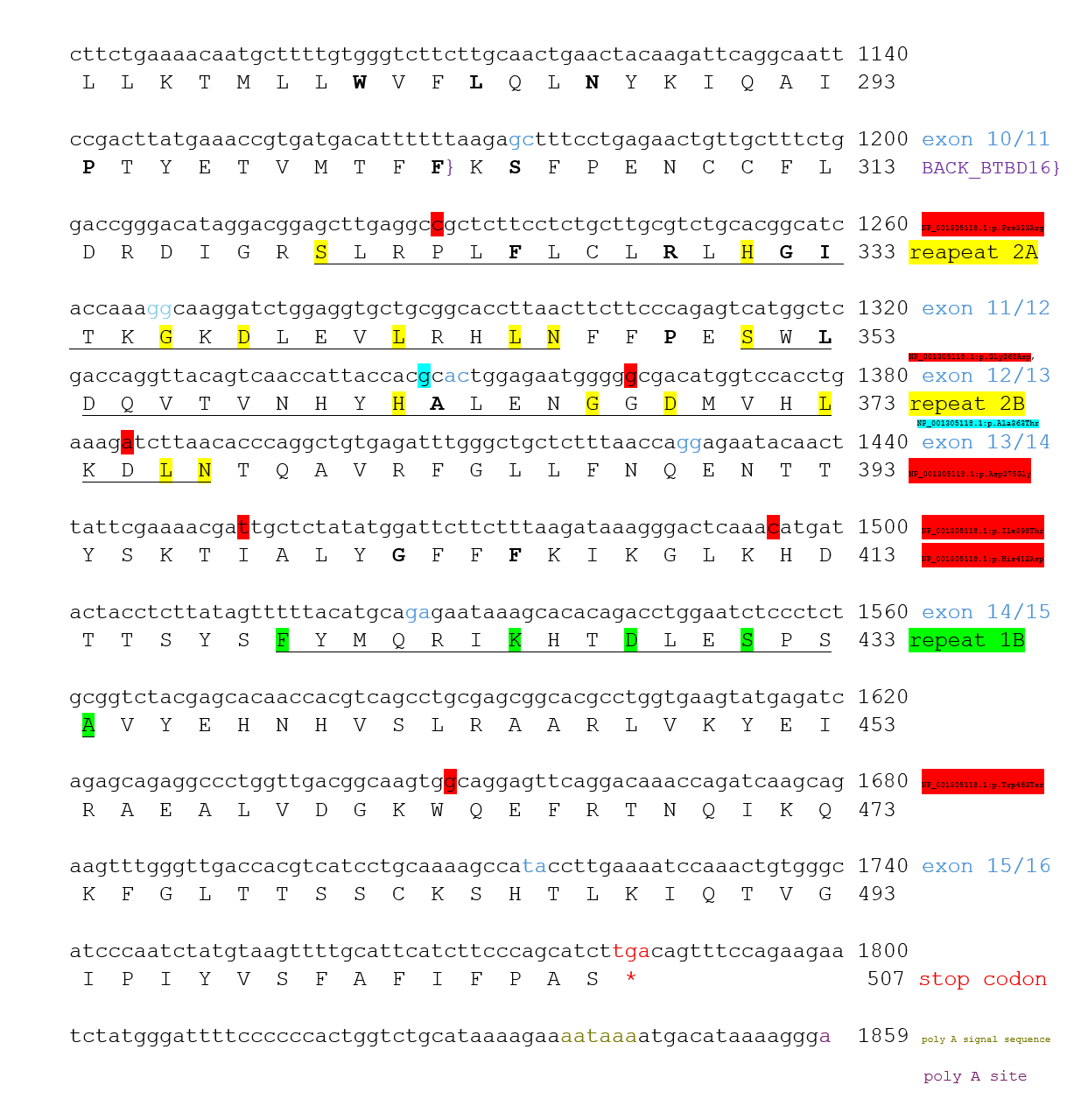
Second half of Homo sapiens conceptual translation. Contains amino acids 274-507 and the 3' UTR.

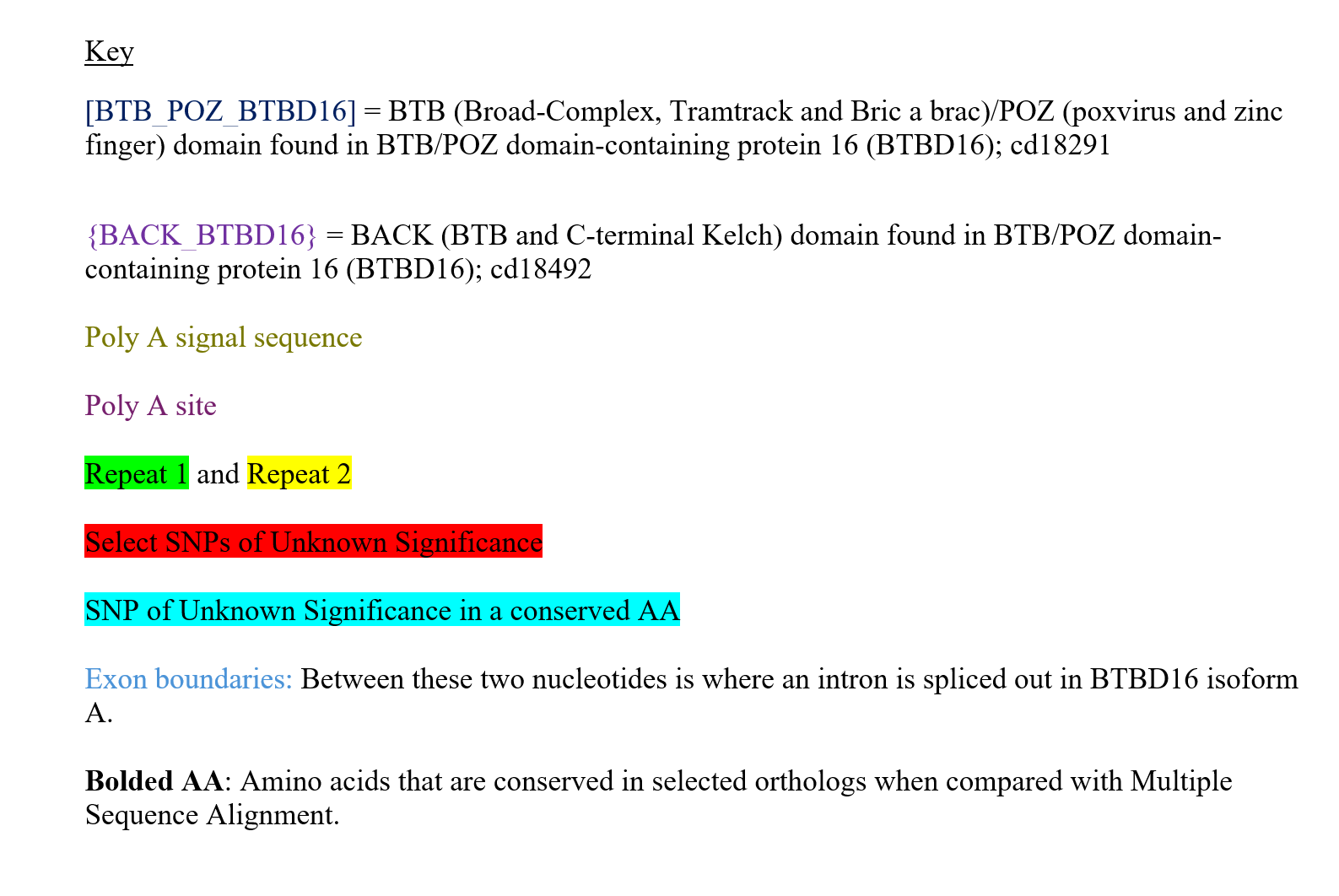
Key for Homo sapiens BTBD16 Conceptual Translation.
