= PAX2 =

Protein-coding gene in humans

Identifiers
- Aliases: PAX2, PAPRS, FSGS7, paired box 2, PAX-2
- External IDs: OMIM: 167409; MGI: 97486; GeneCards: PAX2

Gene location (Human)
Chr.	Chromosome 10 (human)
Band	10q24.31	Start	100,735,396 bp
Band	10q24.31	End	100,829,944 bp

Gene location (Mouse)
Chr.	Chromosome 19 (mouse)
Band	19 C3|19 38.09 cM	Start	44,756,045 bp
Band	19 C3|19 38.09 cM	End	44,837,871 bp
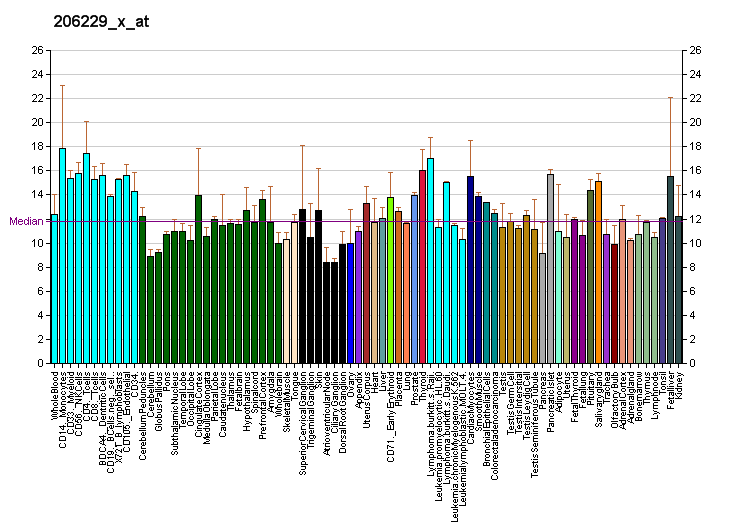

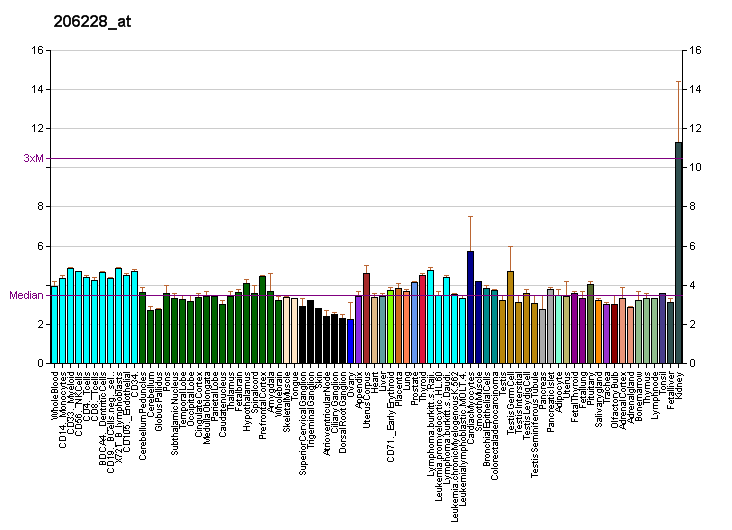
RNA expression pattern
Bgee	Human / Mouse (ortholog); Top expressed in: renal medulla; right uterine tube; human kidney; tail of epididymis; corpus epididymis; seminal vesicula; endometrium; testicle; paraflocculus of cerebellum; kidney tubule / Top expressed in: mesonephros; mesonephric tubules; mesonephric duct; optic stalk; ureteric bud; otic placode; neural ectoderm; epithelium of epididymis; Gray matter of spinal cord; optic recess; More reference expression data
BioGPS	More reference expression data
Gene ontology
Molecular function	DNA binding; superoxide-generating NAD(P)H oxidase activity; transcription factor binding; cis-regulatory region sequence-specific DNA binding; protein binding; DNA-binding transcription factor activity, RNA polymerase II-specific; DNA-binding transcription factor activity
Cellular component	Golgi apparatus; centriolar satellite; microtubule organizing center; protein-DNA complex; nucleolus; lysosome; nucleus; protein-containing complex
Biological process	cellular response to hydrogen peroxide; cellular response to glucose stimulus; cochlea development; pronephros development; cellular response to retinoic acid; regulation of metanephric nephron tubule epithelial cell differentiation; animal organ development; ureter development; cell differentiation; negative regulation of cysteine-type endopeptidase activity involved in apoptotic process; positive regulation of branching involved in ureteric bud morphogenesis; regulation of transcription, DNA-templated; positive regulation of metanephric DCT cell differentiation; regulation of metanephros size; axonogenesis; protein kinase B signaling; negative regulation of mesenchymal cell apoptotic process involved in metanephric nephron morphogenesis; negative regulation of apoptotic process involved in metanephric collecting duct development; positive regulation of epithelial cell proliferation; optic nerve morphogenesis; pronephric field specification; positive regulation of mesenchymal to epithelial transition involved in metanephros morphogenesis; metanephric mesenchymal cell differentiation; ageing; metanephric epithelium development; mesenchymal to epithelial transition involved in metanephros morphogenesis; negative regulation of apoptotic process; glial cell differentiation; transcription by RNA polymerase II; retinal pigment epithelium development; nephric duct formation; transcription, DNA-templated; stem cell differentiation; metanephric distal convoluted tubule development; reactive oxygen species metabolic process; negative regulation of mesenchymal cell apoptotic process involved in metanephros development; mesonephros development; optic nerve structural organization; positive regulation of transcription, DNA-templated; cellular response to epidermal growth factor stimulus; metanephric nephron tubule formation; positive regulation of metanephric glomerulus development; multicellular organism development; branching involved in ureteric bud morphogenesis; neural tube closure; response to nutrient levels; negative regulation of apoptotic process involved in metanephric nephron tubule development; ureter maturation; inner ear morphogenesis; cochlea morphogenesis; positive regulation of optic nerve formation; positive regulation of cell population proliferation; optic cup morphogenesis involved in camera-type eye development; urogenital system development; cell fate determination; negative regulation of programmed cell death; vestibulocochlear nerve formation; camera-type eye development; metanephric collecting duct development; negative regulation of reactive oxygen species metabolic process; mesodermal cell fate specification; negative regulation of transcription, DNA-templated; metanephric mesenchyme development; optic chiasma development; optic nerve development; positive regulation of transcription by RNA polymerase II; visual perception; negative regulation of cytolysis; brain morphogenesis; mesenchymal to epithelial transition
Sources:Amigo / QuickGO
Orthologs
Databases	NCBI: entry; OMA: entry
Species	Human	Mouse
Entrez	5076	18504
Ensembl	ENSG00000075891	ENSMUSG00000004231
UniProt	Q02962; Q5SZP1	P32114
RefSeq (mRNA)	NM_003990; NM_000278; NM_001304569; NM_003987; NM_003988 NM_003989; NM_001374303	NM_011037
RefSeq (protein)	NP_000269; NP_001291498; NP_003978; NP_003979; NP_003980 NP_003981; NP_001361232	NP_035167; NP_001355672; NP_001355673; NP_001355674; NP_001355675 NP_001355676; NP_001355677; NP_001355678; NP_001355679; NP_001355680
Location (UCSC)	Chr 10: 100.74 – 100.83 Mb	Chr 19: 44.76 – 44.84 Mb
PubMed search
- Wikidata
View/Edit Human	View/Edit Mouse

Paired box gene 2, also known as Pax-2, is a protein which in humans is encoded by the PAX2 gene.

== Function ==
The Pax Genes, or Paired-Box Containing Genes, play important roles in the development and proliferation of multiple cell lines, development of organs, and development and organization of the central nervous system. The transcription factor gene PAX2 is important in the regionalized embryological development of the central nervous system. In mammals, the brain is developed in three regions: the forebrain, midbrain, and the hindbrain. Concentration gradients of fibroblast growth factor 8 (FGF8) and Wingless-Type MMTV Integration Site Family, Member 1 (Wnt1) control expression of Pax-2 during development of the Mesencephalon, or midbrain. Similar patterning during embryological development can be observed in “basal chordates or ascidians,” in which organization of the central nervous system in ascidian larvae are also controlled by fibroblast growth factor genes. PAX2 encodes for the transcription factor which appears to be essential in the organization of the midbrain and hindbrain regions, and at the earliest can be detected on either side of the sulcus limitans, which separates motor and sensory nerve nuclei.

PAX2 encodes paired box gene 2, one of many human homologues of the Drosophila melanogaster gene prd. The central feature of this transcription factor gene family is the conserved DNA-binding paired box domain. PAX2 is believed to be a target of transcriptional suppression by the tumor suppressor gene WT1. Pax 2 is a transcription factor controlled by the signaling molecules Wnt1 and Fgf8. Pax2 along with other transcription factors Pax5, Pax8, En1, and En 2 are expressed across the Otx2-Gbx2 boundary in the mid-hindbrain region. These transcription factors work with the signaling molecules Wnt1 and Fgf8 to maintain the MHB organizer. The MHB controls midbrain and cerebellum development. Pax2 is the earliest known gene to be expressed across the Otx2-Gbx2 boundary. It is first expressed in the late primitive streak stage and is expressed in a narrow ring centered at the MHB during somitogenesis. Transgene expression of the mid-hindbrain and developing kidney is directed by Pax2. There are three distinct MHB-specific enhancers in the upstream region of Pax2. Expression at the MHB from the four-somite stage onwards is directed by the two late enhancers in the proximal and distal regions of Pax2. The early enhancer located in the intermediate region activates the mid-hindbrain region of late gastrula embryos. The activation of Pax2, Pax5, and Pax8 is a conserved feature of all vertebrates.

== Clinical significance ==
Pathologically, Pax2 has been demonstrated to activate hepatocyte growth factor (HGF) gene promoter, and both have been indicated as playing a role in human prostate cancers.

Mutations within PAX2 have been shown to result in optic nerve colobomas and renal hypoplasia. Alternative splicing of this gene results in multiple transcript variants. Pax2 and Pax8 are also necessary for the formation of the pronephros and subsequent kidney structures. Pax2 and Pax8 regulate the expression of Gata3. Without these genes mutations in the urogenital system arise.

Pax2 misexpression is frequently observed in proliferative disorders of the kidney. For example, Pax2 is highly expressed in polycystic kidney disease (PKD), Wilms' tumor (WT), and renal cell carcinoma (RCC). Pax2 expression in these diseases appears fuel cell cycling, inhibit cell death, and confer resistance to chemotherapy. Due to its role in these diseases, Pax2 is an attractive therapeutic target and a number of methods for inhibiting its activity have been investigated. In fact, a small-molecule was recently identified with the ability to disrupt Pax2 mediated transcription by blocking Pax2 from binding to DNA.

== Interactions ==
PAX2 has been shown to interact with PAXIP1.

== See also ==
- Pax genes
