= ARMS2 =

Protein-coding gene in the species Homo sapiens

Identifiers
- Aliases: ARMS2, ARMD8, age-related maculopathy susceptibility 2
- External IDs: OMIM: 611313; HomoloGene: 88167; GeneCards: ARMS2; OMA:ARMS2 - orthologs

Gene location (Human)
Chr.	Chromosome 10 (human)
Band	10q26.13	Start	122,454,653 bp
Band	10q26.13	End	122,457,352 bp
RNA expression pattern
Bgee	Human / Mouse (ortholog); Top expressed in: gonad; placenta; left ovary; left testis; right testis; right ovary; pituitary gland; smooth muscle tissue; anterior pituitary; right lobe of liver / n/a; More reference expression data
BioGPS	n/a
Orthologs
Species	Human	Mouse
Entrez	387715	n/a
Ensembl	ENSG00000254636	n/a
UniProt	P0C7Q2	n/a
RefSeq (mRNA)	NM_001099667	n/a
RefSeq (protein)	NP_001093137	n/a
Location (UCSC)	Chr 10: 122.45 – 122.46 Mb	n/a
PubMed search		n/a
- Wikidata
View/Edit Human

Age-related maculopathy susceptibility protein 2 is a mitochondrial protein that in humans is encoded by the ARMS2 gene. The ARMS2 protein is closely linked to the ARMS2 gene. The ARMS2 gene is a genetic risk factor for age-related macular degeneration (AMD). The exact biological mechanism of the ARMS2 protein is not fully understood, but studies of protein transport and variants have indicated that the protein plays a role in processes that impact the retina.

== Cellular transport ==
The ARMS2 protein undergoes a process to move from inside the cell to the extracellular matrix of the choroid eye layer. This process is one that accounts for the small 11 kDa molecular weight of the ARMS2 protein. The process of which the ARMS2 protein exits the cell is through the use of the chaperone proteins calnexin and calreticulin. The ARMS2 protein is able to recruit the chaperones from the cytosol. This is different from the other known processes of protein secretion which is usually facilitated by the Endoplasmic Reticulum and Golgi Body. The lack of the N-terminal leading sequence contributes to this process. Without the presence of chaperone proteins the ARMS2 proteins are not excreted from the cell.

== Variants ==
The ARMS2 protein is impacted by the expression of the ARMS2 gene located on chromosome 10q26. The ARMS2 locus is associated with risk factors that connected to the development of age related macular degeneration (AMD). This gene was detected in human retinal pigment epithelial cells (ARPE-19) through immunofluorescence and reverse transcriptase PCR.

When variants of the gene are expressed they cause the development of mutated ARMS2 proteins, that fail to exit the cell due to the lack of favorable interactions with chaperone proteins, this lack of interaction causes the ARMS2 protein to lack proper tertiary structures. ARMS2 protein translation is also impacted by the addition of risk variants experimentally, specifically it is notable that AMD risk haplotype leads to lower levels of ARMS2 mRNA transcription, which results in lower levels of ARMS2 protein translation and availability in the cell. A specific mutation in the 3'-untranslated region of ARMS2 causes this impact as it controls mRNA stability.

Despite the determination of ARMS2 expression decreasing with the addition of AMD-associated risk variants there is still no concrete evidence that the development of age-related macular degeneration (AMD) is caused by the low levels of ARMS2 protein.
