= Calreticulin protein family =

Family of calcium-binding proteins

Calreticulin
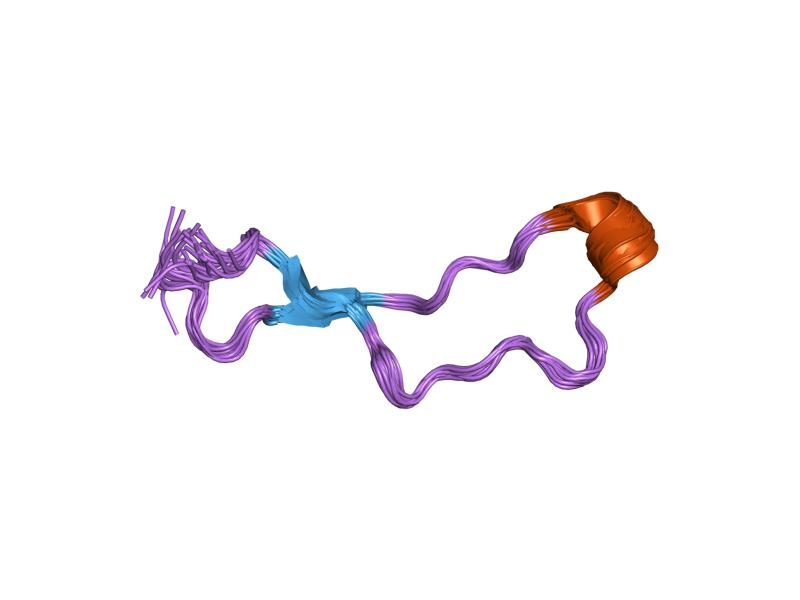
- Solution structure of calreticulin p-domain subdomain (residues 221–256)

Identifiers
- Symbol: Calreticulin
- Pfam: PF00262
- InterPro: IPR001580
- PROSITE: PDOC00636
- SCOP2: 1jhn / SCOPe / SUPFAM
- Membranome: 189
Available protein structures:
- PDB: IPR001580 PF00262 (ECOD; PDBsum)
- AlphaFold: IPR001580; PF00262

In molecular biology, the calreticulin protein family is a family of calcium-binding proteins. This family includes calreticulin, calnexin and camlegin.
