= PAXIP1 =

Protein-coding gene in the species Homo sapiens

Identifiers
- Aliases: PAXIP1, CAGF29, PACIP1, PAXIP1L, PTIP, TNRC2, CAGF28, PAX interacting protein 1
- External IDs: OMIM: 608254; MGI: 1890430; GeneCards: PAXIP1
Available structures
PDB	Ortholog search: PDBe RCSB
PDB	List of PDB id codes 3SQD

Gene location (Human)
Chr.	Chromosome 7 (human)
Band	7q36.2	Start	154,943,687 bp
Band	7q36.2	End	155,003,124 bp

Gene location (Mouse)
Chr.	Chromosome 5 (mouse)
Band	5 B1|5 13.23 cM	Start	27,945,078 bp
Band	5 B1|5 13.23 cM	End	27,996,689 bp
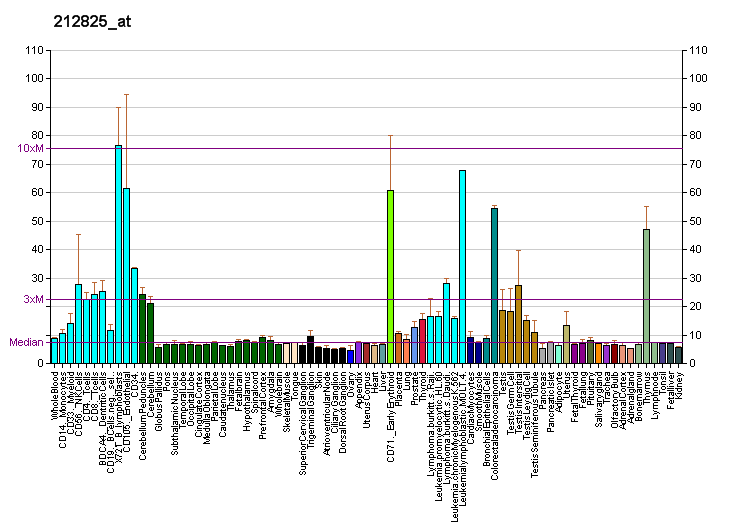
RNA expression pattern
Bgee	Human / Mouse (ortholog); Top expressed in: secondary oocyte; cerebellar hemisphere; ventricular zone; right hemisphere of cerebellum; corpus epididymis; thymus; cerebellar vermis; cartilage tissue; embryo; ganglionic eminence / Top expressed in: tail of embryo; genital tubercle; epiblast; ventricular zone; zygote; islet of Langerhans; thymus; otic placode; spermatid; primitive streak; More reference expression data
BioGPS	More reference expression data
Gene ontology
Molecular function	protein binding
Cellular component	nuclear matrix; nucleoplasm; MLL3/4 complex; nucleus; histone methyltransferase complex; chromosome
Biological process	response to ionizing radiation; positive regulation of histone H3-K36 methylation; DNA recombination; regulation of transcription, DNA-templated; chorion development; DNA damage response, signal transduction by p53 class mediator; transcription, DNA-templated; positive regulation of histone acetylation; cellular response to DNA damage stimulus; vasculogenesis; positive regulation of isotype switching; histone H3-K4 methylation; positive regulation of histone H3-K4 methylation; adipose tissue development; double-strand break repair via nonhomologous end joining; positive regulation of protein ubiquitination; endothelial cell migration; DNA repair; positive regulation of transcription initiation from RNA polymerase II promoter; regulation of cell cycle G2/M phase transition; positive regulation of isotype switching to IgG isotypes; positive regulation of response to DNA damage stimulus; negative regulation of DNA-binding transcription factor activity
Sources:Amigo / QuickGO
Orthologs
Databases	NCBI: entry; OMA: entry
Species	Human	Mouse
Entrez	22976	55982
Ensembl	ENSG00000157212	ENSMUSG00000002221
UniProt	Q6ZW49	Q6NZQ4
RefSeq (mRNA)	NM_007349	NM_018878
RefSeq (protein)	NP_031375	NP_061366
Location (UCSC)	Chr 7: 154.94 – 155 Mb	Chr 5: 27.95 – 28 Mb
PubMed search
- Wikidata
View/Edit Human	View/Edit Mouse

PAX-interacting protein 1 is a protein that in humans is encoded by the PAXIP1 gene.

== Function ==
This gene is a member of the paired box (PAX) gene family and encodes a nuclear protein with six BRCT (breast cancer carboxy-terminal) domains. This protein plays a critical role in maintaining genome stability, condensation of chromatin and progression through mitosis. Protein-affecting variants have also been implicated in Alzheimer's disease.

== Interactions ==
PAXIP1 has been shown to interact with PAX2 and TP53BP1.
