= TACC2 =

Protein-coding gene in the species Homo sapiens

Identifiers
- Aliases: TACC2, AZU-1, ECTACC, transforming acidic coiled-coil containing protein 2
- External IDs: OMIM: 605302; MGI: 1928899; HomoloGene: 5087; GeneCards: TACC2; OMA:TACC2 - orthologs

Gene location (Human)
Chr.	Chromosome 10 (human)
Band	10q26.13	Start	121,989,163 bp
Band	10q26.13	End	122,254,545 bp

Gene location (Mouse)
Chr.	Chromosome 7 (mouse)
Band	7|7 F3	Start	130,179,168 bp
Band	7|7 F3	End	130,366,515 bp
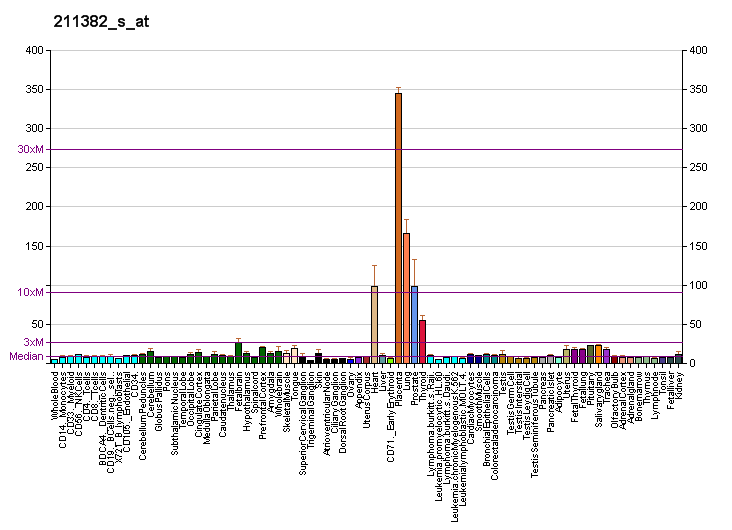

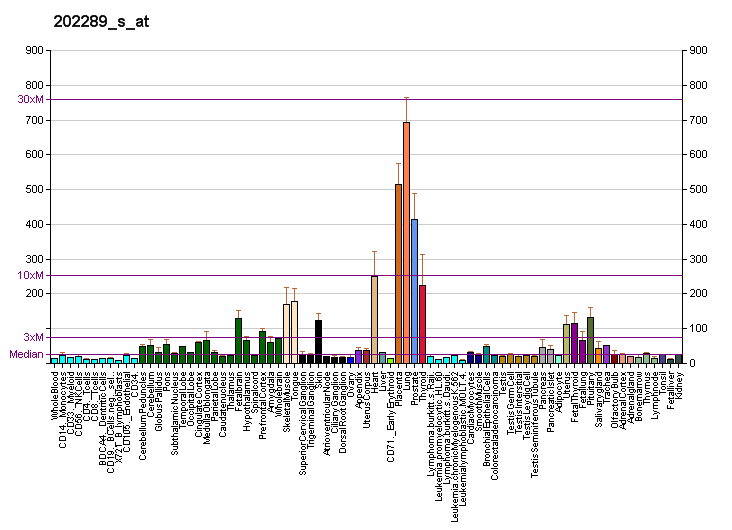
RNA expression pattern
Bgee	Human / Mouse (ortholog); Top expressed in: apex of heart; Skeletal muscle tissue of biceps brachii; gastrocnemius muscle; muscle of thigh; Skeletal muscle tissue of rectus abdominis; skin of leg; skin of abdomen; right auricle of heart; body of tongue; glutes / Top expressed in: muscle of thigh; digastric muscle; extraocular muscle; temporal muscle; triceps brachii muscle; medial head of gastrocnemius muscle; sternocleidomastoid muscle; zygote; vastus lateralis muscle; soleus muscle; More reference expression data
BioGPS	More reference expression data
Orthologs
Species	Human	Mouse
Entrez	10579	57752
Ensembl	ENSG00000138162	ENSMUSG00000030852
UniProt	O95359; Q4VXL4	Q9JJG0
RefSeq (mRNA)	NM_001291876; NM_001291877; NM_001291878; NM_001291879; NM_006997 NM_206860; NM_206861; NM_206862	NM_001004468; NM_021314; NM_206856; NM_001347637
RefSeq (protein)	NP_001278805; NP_001278806; NP_001278807; NP_001278808; NP_008928 NP_996742; NP_996743; NP_996744; NP_001278808.1	NP_001004468; NP_001334566; NP_067289; NP_996738
Location (UCSC)	Chr 10: 121.99 – 122.25 Mb	Chr 7: 130.18 – 130.37 Mb
PubMed search
- Wikidata
View/Edit Human	View/Edit Mouse

Transforming acidic coiled-coil-containing protein 2 is a protein that in humans is encoded by the TACC2 gene.

Transforming acidic coiled-coil proteins are a conserved family of centrosome- and microtubule-interacting proteins that are implicated in cancer. This gene encodes a protein that concentrates at centrosomes throughout the cell cycle. This gene lies within a chromosomal region associated with tumorigenesis. Expression of this gene is thought to affect the progression of breast tumors. Expression of this gene is also induced by erythropoietin.
