= Calmegin =

Protein found in humans

CLGN

Identifiers
- Aliases: CLGN, calmegin
- External IDs: OMIM: 601858; MGI: 107472; GeneCards: CLGN

Gene location (Human)
Chr.	Chromosome 4 (human)
Band	4q31.1	Start	140,388,453 bp
Band	4q31.1	End	140,427,661 bp

Gene location (Mouse)
Chr.	Chromosome 8 (mouse)
Band	8 C2|8 39.97 cM	Start	84,116,496 bp
Band	8 C2|8 39.97 cM	End	84,155,181 bp
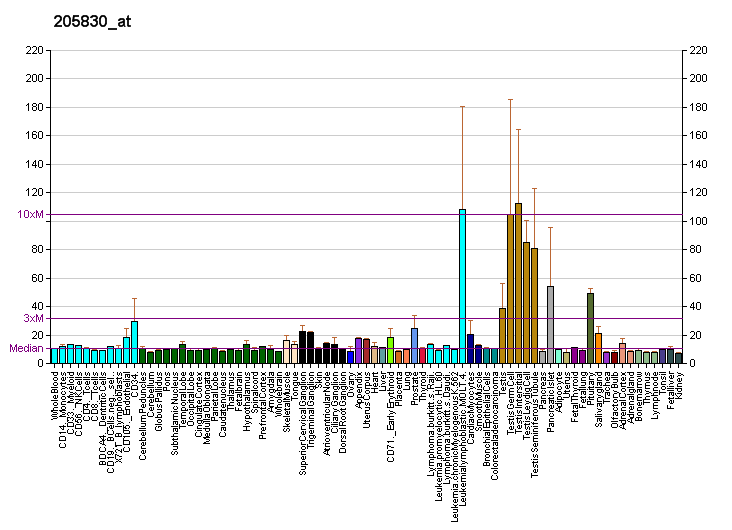
RNA expression pattern
Bgee	Human / Mouse (ortholog); Top expressed in: right ventricle; myocardium of left ventricle; left testis; right testis; cardiac muscle tissue of right atrium; right auricle of heart; endothelial cell; islet of Langerhans; apex of heart; retinal pigment epithelium / Top expressed in: spermatocyte; spermatid; seminiferous tubule; olfactory epithelium; lumbar spinal ganglion; trigeminal ganglion; facial motor nucleus; anterior horn of spinal cord; medulla oblongata; substantia nigra; More reference expression data
BioGPS	More reference expression data
Gene ontology
Molecular function	unfolded protein binding; protein folding chaperone activity; calcium ion binding; protein binding
Cellular component	integral component of membrane; endoplasmic reticulum membrane; membrane; endoplasmic reticulum; nuclear envelope
Biological process	protein folding; single fertilization; binding of sperm to zona pellucida; protein-containing complex assembly
Sources:Amigo / QuickGO
Orthologs
Databases	NCBI: entry; OMA: entry
Species	Human	Mouse
Entrez	1047	12745
Ensembl	ENSG00000153132	ENSMUSG00000002190
UniProt	O14967	P52194
RefSeq (mRNA)	NM_001130675; NM_004362	NM_009904; NM_001329627; NM_001329680
RefSeq (protein)	NP_001124147; NP_004353	NP_001316556; NP_001316609; NP_034034
Location (UCSC)	Chr 4: 140.39 – 140.43 Mb	Chr 8: 84.12 – 84.16 Mb
PubMed search
- Wikidata
View/Edit Human	View/Edit Mouse

Calmegin, also known as CLGN, is a protein which in humans is encoded by the CLGN gene. Calmegin is also present in other animals including mice.

== Function ==
Calmegin is a testis-specific endoplasmic reticulum chaperone protein. CLGN may play a role in spermatogeneisis and infertility.
