= UBE2L3 =

Protein-coding gene in humans

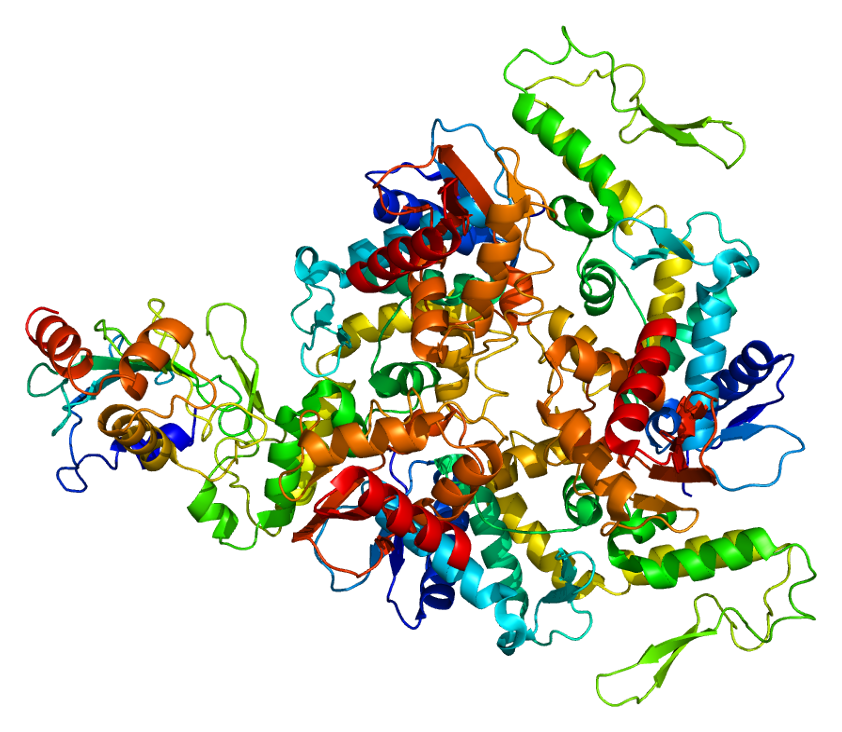

Identifiers
- Aliases: UBE2L3, E2-F1, L-UBC, UBCH7, UbcM4, ubiquitin conjugating enzyme E2 L3
- External IDs: OMIM: 603721; MGI: 109240; GeneCards: UBE2L3
Available structures
PDB	Ortholog search: PDBe RCSB
PDB	List of PDB id codes 1C4Z, 1FBV, 3SQV, 3SY2, 4Q5E, 4Q5H, 5HPT
Enzyme activity
EC #	BRENDA	ExPASy	KEGG	MetaCyc
2.3.2.23	↗	↗	↗	↗

Gene location (Human)
Chr.	Chromosome 22 (human)
Band	22q11.21	Start	21,549,447 bp
Band	22q11.21	End	21,624,034 bp

Gene location (Mouse)
Chr.	Chromosome 16 (mouse)
Band	16 A3|16 10.63 cM	Start	16,969,877 bp
Band	16 A3|16 10.63 cM	End	17,020,513 bp
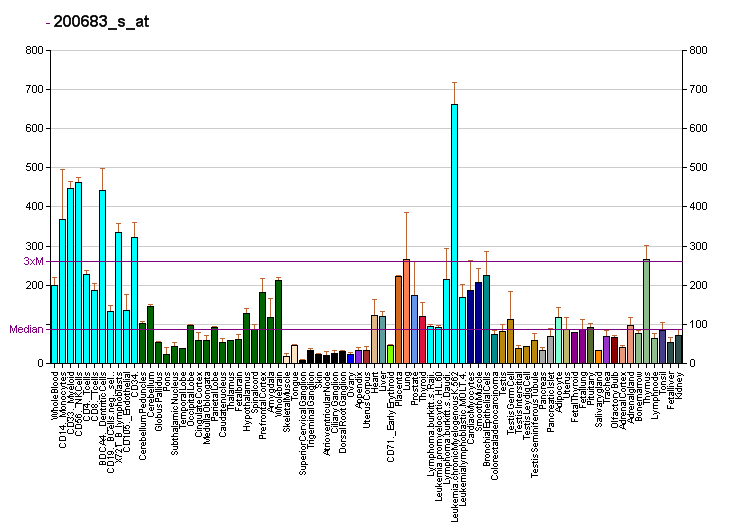

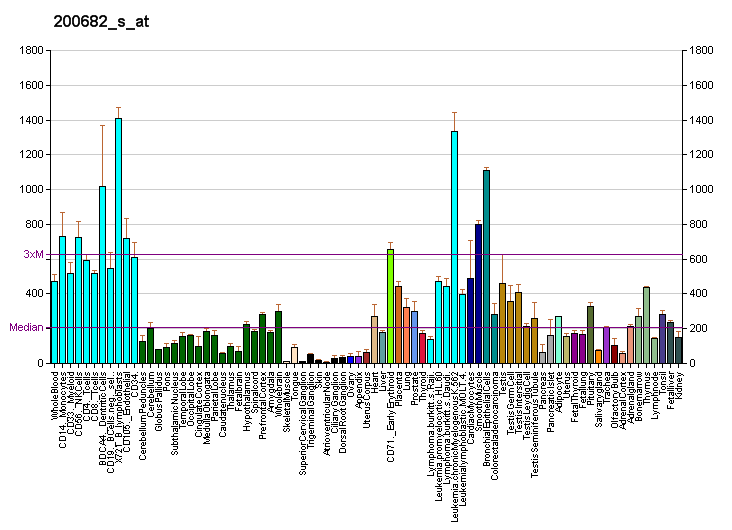

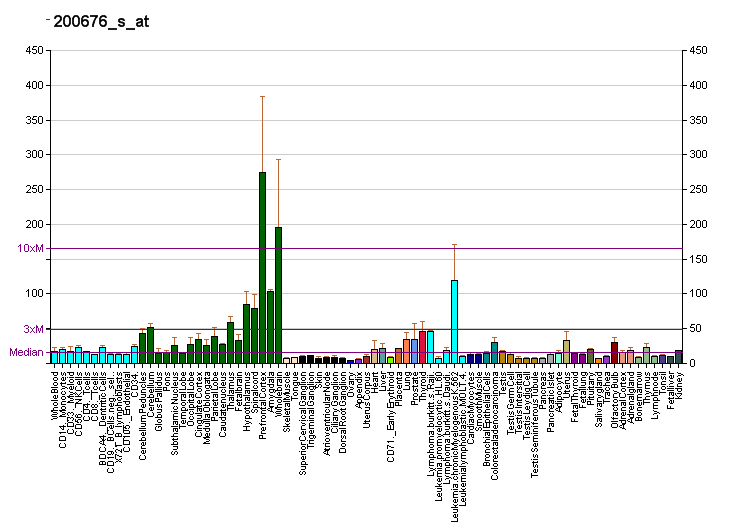
RNA expression pattern
Bgee	Human / Mouse (ortholog); Top expressed in: oocyte; secondary oocyte; mucosa of transverse colon; C1 segment; right frontal lobe; islet of Langerhans; Brodmann area 9; smooth muscle tissue; cingulate gyrus; anterior cingulate cortex / Top expressed in: spermatid; tail of embryo; morula; internal carotid artery; genital tubercle; ventricular zone; blastocyst; yolk sac; spermatocyte; embryo; More reference expression data
BioGPS	More reference expression data
Gene ontology
Molecular function	transferase activity; nucleotide binding; transcription coactivator activity; ubiquitin-protein transferase activity; protein binding; ubiquitin-protein transferase activator activity; enzyme binding; ATP binding; ubiquitin protein ligase binding; RNA binding; ubiquitin conjugating enzyme activity
Cellular component	cytoplasm; ubiquitin ligase complex; extracellular exosome; nucleus; nucleoplasm; cytosol
Biological process	cell cycle phase transition; cellular response to steroid hormone stimulus; regulation of transcription, DNA-templated; ubiquitin-dependent protein catabolic process; positive regulation of protein targeting to mitochondrion; protein polyubiquitination; transcription, DNA-templated; protein K11-linked ubiquitination; cellular response to glucocorticoid stimulus; positive regulation of ubiquitin-protein transferase activity; cell population proliferation; positive regulation of protein ubiquitination; protein ubiquitination
Sources:Amigo / QuickGO
Orthologs
Databases	NCBI: entry; OMA: entry
Species	Human	Mouse
Entrez	7332	22195
Ensembl	ENSG00000185651	ENSMUSG00000038965
UniProt	P68036	P68037
RefSeq (mRNA)	NM_001256355; NM_001256356; NM_003347; NM_198157	NM_009456
RefSeq (protein)	NP_001243284; NP_001243285; NP_003338; NP_003338.1	NP_033482
Location (UCSC)	Chr 22: 21.55 – 21.62 Mb	Chr 16: 16.97 – 17.02 Mb
PubMed search
- Wikidata
View/Edit Human	View/Edit Mouse

Ubiquitin-conjugating enzyme E2 L3 (UBE2L3), also called UBCH7, is a protein that in humans is encoded by the UBE2L3 gene. As an E2 enzyme, UBE2L3 participates in ubiquitination to target proteins for degradation. The role of UBE2L3 in the ubiquitination of the NF-κB precursor implicated it in various major autoimmune diseases, including rheumatoid arthritis (RA), celiac disease, Crohn's disease (CD), and systemic lupus erythematosus.

== Structure ==
=== Gene ===
The UBE2L3 gene is located at chromosome 22q11.21, consisting of 6 exons. Two alternatively spliced transcript variants encoding distinct isoforms have been found for this gene.

=== Protein ===
There are 38 E2 enzymes in humans. They all contain a conserved catalytic core domain that interacts with E1 and E3 and many E2s possess additional N- and/or C-terminal protein sequences. In contrast to other E2s, residues necessary for lysine reactivity are absent: the D87 and D117 residues (in UBCH5C numbering) are replaced by Pro and His residues.

== Function ==
The modification of proteins with ubiquitin is an important cellular mechanism for targeting abnormal or short-lived proteins for degradation. Ubiquitination involves at least three classes of enzymes: ubiquitin-activating enzymes (E1s), ubiquitin-conjugating enzymes (E2s) and ubiquitin-protein ligases (E3s). E2s play a key role in the whole ubiquitin (Ub) transfer pathway and are responsible for Ub cellular signaling. Unlike many E2s that transfer Ub with RINGs, UBE2L3 has E3-independent reactivity with lysine. This enzyme is demonstrated to participate in the ubiquitination of p53, c-Fos, and the NF-κB precursor p105 in vitro. UBE2L3 is primarily known for its role in the cell cycle. Specifically, UBE2L3 manages cell cycle regulatory protein levels via the ubiquitin proteolytic pathway (UPP) during the G1/S transition and during the actual S phase.

== Clinical significance ==
Through genome-wide association studies (GWAS), UBE2L3 has been associated with several autoimmune diseases, including RA, celiac disease, CD, and SLE via the ubiquitination of the NK-κB precursor. This association was observed in European, Asian, and African-American populations. UBE2L3 has been linked to natural killer cell cytotoxic function, and high UBE2L3 levels had contributed to clearing chronic HBV infection. UBE2L3 controls the protein stability of 53BP1 and determines the DNA double-strand break repair choice. Loss of UBE2L3 stabilizes 53BP1 and force cells to choose NHEJ to repair DNA double-strand break. Repair by NHEJ leads to radial chromosomes and cell death. UBE2L3 depletion may become a novel strategy in enhancing the effect of anticancer therapies. The haplotype of UBE2L3 gene is also reported associated with Hashimoto's thyroiditis in a Chinese Han population.(27094594)

== Interactions ==
UBE2L3 has been shown to interact with:

- ARIH1,
- ARIH2,
- CBL,
- CHEK1,
- NEDD4,
- PARK2,
- SMURF2,
- TNFAIP3,
- TNFSF4,
- TNIP1,
- TRAF6,
- UBE3A,
- UBE3A, and
- UBOX5.
