= Eukaryotic translation initiation factor 4E family =

IF4E
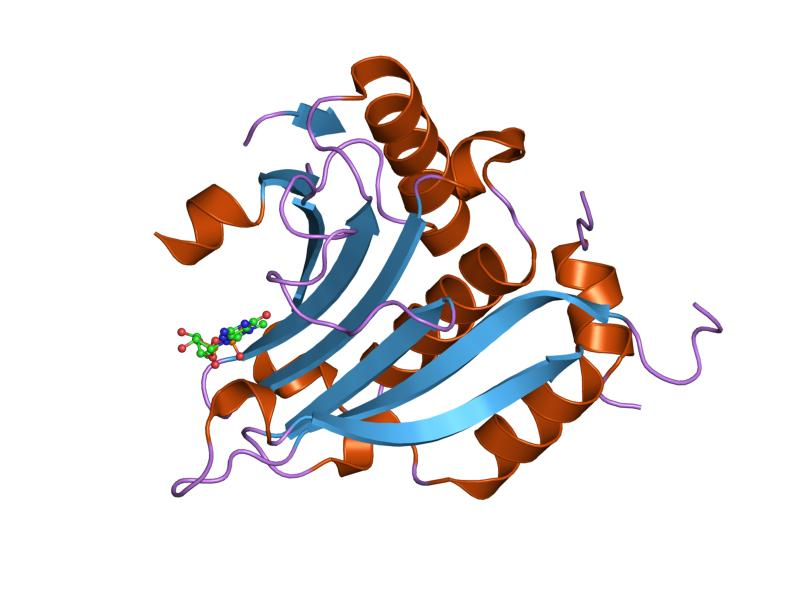
- cocrystal structure of eif4e/4e-bp1 peptide

Identifiers
- Symbol: IF4E
- Pfam: PF01652
- InterPro: IPR001040
- PROSITE: PDOC00641
- SCOP2: 1ap8 / SCOPe / SUPFAM
Available protein structures:
- PDB: IPR001040 PF01652 (ECOD; PDBsum)
- AlphaFold: IPR001040; PF01652

In molecular biology, the eukaryotic translation initiation factor 4E family (eIF-4E) is a family of proteins that bind to the cap structure of eukaryotic cellular mRNAs. Members of this family recognise and bind the 7-methyl-guanosine-containing (m7Gppp) cap during an early step in the initiation of protein synthesis and facilitate ribosome binding to an mRNA by inducing the unwinding of its secondary structures. A tryptophan in the central part of the sequence of human eIF-4E seems to be implicated in cap-binding.

Members of this family include EIF4E, EIF4E2, EIF4E3 and EIF4E1B.
