= EIF4E2 =

Protein-coding gene in the species Homo sapiens

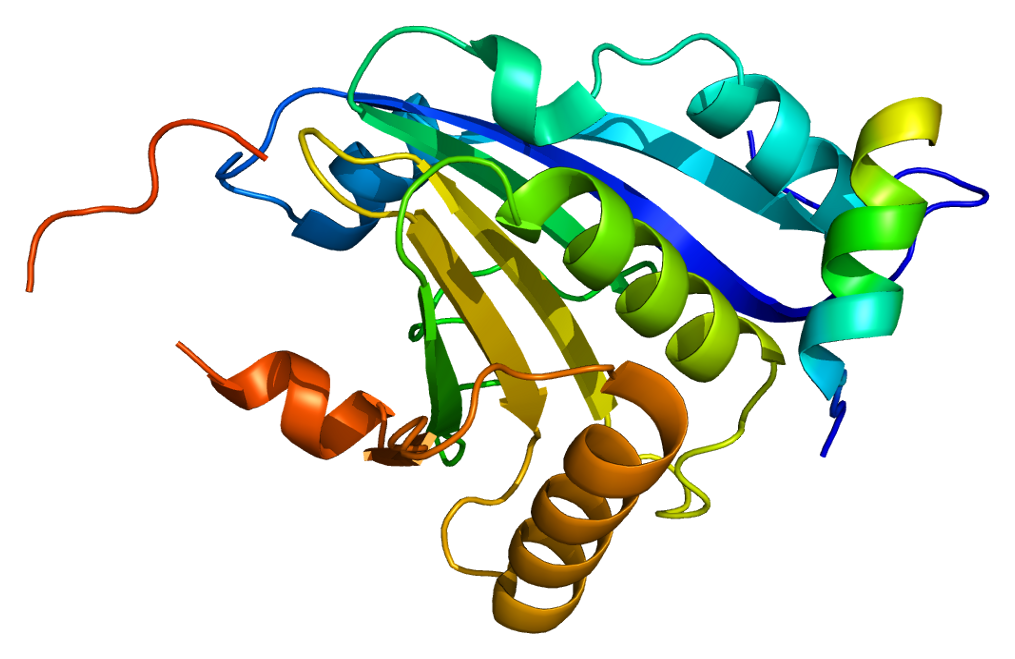
Available structures
PDB	Ortholog search: PDBe RCSB
PDB	List of PDB id codes 2JGB, 2JGC

Identifiers
- Aliases: EIF4E2, 4E-LP, 4EHP, EIF4EL3, IF4e, eukaryotic translation initiation factor 4E family member 2, h4EHP
- External IDs: OMIM: 605895; MGI: 1914440; HomoloGene: 128466; GeneCards: EIF4E2; OMA:EIF4E2 - orthologs

Gene location (Human)
Chr.	Chromosome 2 (human)
Band	2q37.1	Start	232,550,659 bp
Band	2q37.1	End	232,583,644 bp

Gene location (Mouse)
Chr.	Chromosome 1 (mouse)
Band	1|1 C5	Start	87,141,636 bp
Band	1|1 C5	End	87,168,210 bp
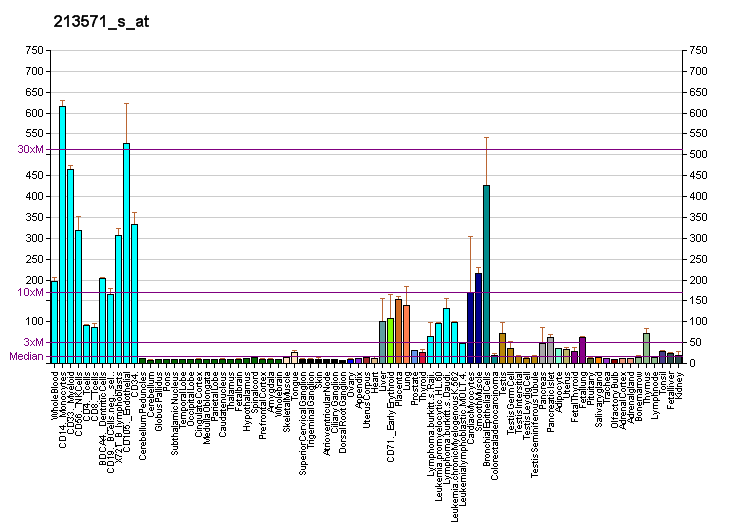

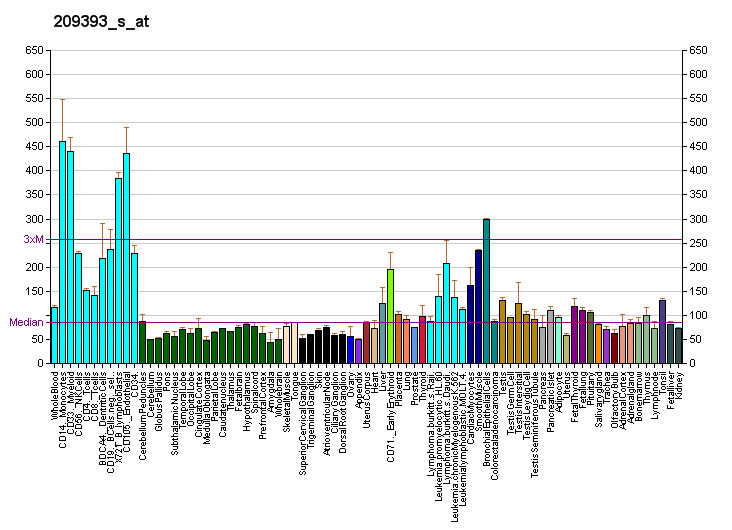
RNA expression pattern
Bgee	Human / Mouse (ortholog); Top expressed in: monocyte; sural nerve; Achilles tendon; gastrocnemius muscle; rectum; gingival epithelium; mucosa of transverse colon; muscle of thigh; islet of Langerhans; amniotic fluid / Top expressed in: internal carotid artery; external carotid artery; fossa; condyle; yolk sac; primitive streak; seminal vesicula; endothelial cell of lymphatic vessel; Paneth cell; vas deferens; More reference expression data
BioGPS	More reference expression data
Gene ontology
Molecular function	RNA cap binding; translation factor activity, RNA binding; protein binding; translation initiation factor activity; ubiquitin protein ligase binding; RNA binding; RNA 7-methylguanosine cap binding
Cellular component	cytoplasm; cytosol; mRNA cap binding complex; eukaryotic translation initiation factor 4F complex
Biological process	translational initiation; negative regulation of translation; in utero embryonic development; protein biosynthesis; regulation of translation
Sources:Amigo / QuickGO
Orthologs
Species	Human	Mouse
Entrez	9470	26987
Ensembl	ENSG00000135930	ENSMUSG00000026254
UniProt	O60573	Q8BMB3
RefSeq (mRNA)	NM_001276336; NM_001276337; NM_001282958; NM_004846; NM_001330201 NM_001330202; NM_001330203	NM_001039169; NM_001039170; NM_023314; NM_001347083
RefSeq (protein)	NP_001263265; NP_001263266; NP_001269887; NP_001317130; NP_001317131 NP_001317132; NP_004837	NP_001034258; NP_001034259; NP_001334012; NP_075803
Location (UCSC)	Chr 2: 232.55 – 232.58 Mb	Chr 1: 87.14 – 87.17 Mb
PubMed search
- Wikidata
View/Edit Human	View/Edit Mouse

Eukaryotic translation initiation factor 4E type 2 is a protein that in humans is encoded by the EIF4E2 gene. It belongs to the eukaryotic translation initiation factor 4E family.

== Interactions ==
EIF4E2 has been shown to interact with ARIH1.
