= EIF4E3 =

Protein-coding gene in the species Homo sapiens

Available structures
PDB	Ortholog search: PDBe RCSB
PDB	List of PDB id codes 4B6U, 4B6V

Identifiers
- Aliases: EIF4E3, eIF-4E3, eIF4E-3, eukaryotic translation initiation factor 4E family member 3
- External IDs: OMIM: 609896; MGI: 1914142; HomoloGene: 41652; GeneCards: EIF4E3; OMA:EIF4E3 - orthologs

Gene location (Human)
Chr.	Chromosome 3 (human)
Band	3p13	Start	71,675,414 bp
Band	3p13	End	71,754,773 bp

Gene location (Mouse)
Chr.	Chromosome 6 (mouse)
Band	6|6 D3	Start	99,625,135 bp
Band	6|6 D3	End	99,666,771 bp
RNA expression pattern
Bgee	Human / Mouse (ortholog); Top expressed in: buccal mucosa cell; tibialis anterior muscle; deltoid muscle; mucosa of ileum; monocyte; myocardium of left ventricle; quadriceps femoris muscle; gastrocnemius muscle; vastus lateralis muscle; biceps brachii / Top expressed in: primary oocyte; secondary oocyte; zygote; interventricular septum; Rostral migratory stream; brown adipose tissue; triceps brachii muscle; temporal muscle; myocardium of ventricle; vastus lateralis muscle; More reference expression data
BioGPS	n/a
Gene ontology
Molecular function	translation initiation factor activity; RNA binding; RNA 7-methylguanosine cap binding
Cellular component	cytoplasm; cytosol; mRNA cap binding complex; eukaryotic translation initiation factor 4F complex
Biological process	translational initiation; regulation of translation; protein biosynthesis
Sources:Amigo / QuickGO
Orthologs
Species	Human	Mouse
Entrez	317649	66892
Ensembl	ENSG00000163412	ENSMUSG00000093661
UniProt	Q8N5X7	Q9DBB5
RefSeq (mRNA)	NM_001134649; NM_001134650; NM_001134651; NM_001282886; NM_173359	NM_025829
RefSeq (protein)	NP_001128121; NP_001128122; NP_001128123; NP_001269815; NP_775495	NP_080105
Location (UCSC)	Chr 3: 71.68 – 71.75 Mb	Chr 6: 99.63 – 99.67 Mb
PubMed search
- Wikidata
View/Edit Human	View/Edit Mouse

Eukaryotic translation initiation factor 4E family member 3 is a protein that in humans is encoded by the EIF4E3 gene.

EIF4E3 belongs to the EIF4E family of translational initiation factors that interact with the 5-prime cap structure of mRNA and recruit mRNA to the ribosome.
