= UBOX5 =

Protein-coding gene in the species Homo sapiens

Identifiers
- Aliases: UBOX5, RNF37, UBCE7IP5, UIP5, hUIP5, U-box domain containing 5
- External IDs: MGI: 2154658; GeneCards: UBOX5
Enzyme activity
EC #	BRENDA	ExPASy	KEGG	MetaCyc
2.3.2.27	↗	↗	↗	↗

Gene location (Human)
Chr.	Chromosome 20 (human)
Band	20p13	Start	3,107,573 bp
Band	20p13	End	3,160,196 bp

Gene location (Mouse)
Chr.	Chromosome 2 (mouse)
Band	2 F1|2	Start	130,431,922 bp
Band	2 F1|2	End	130,471,958 bp
RNA expression pattern
Bgee	Human / Mouse (ortholog); Top expressed in: gonad; parotid gland; gastrocnemius muscle; muscle of thigh; skeletal muscle tissue; blood; Region I of hippocampus proper; popliteal artery; tibial arteries; inferior olivary nucleus / Top expressed in: otic vesicle; otic placode; spermatocyte; zygote; genital tubercle; female urethra; tail of embryo; maxillary prominence; mandibular prominence; saccule; More reference expression data
BioGPS	n/a
Gene ontology
Molecular function	ubiquitin-ubiquitin ligase activity; protein binding; ubiquitin protein ligase binding; metal ion binding; ubiquitin protein ligase activity; ubiquitin-protein transferase activity; transferase activity
Cellular component	nuclear body; nucleus; nucleoplasm; focal adhesion
Biological process	protein polyubiquitination; protein ubiquitination
Sources:Amigo / QuickGO
Orthologs
Databases	NCBI: entry; OMA: entry
Species	Human	Mouse
Entrez	22888	140629
Ensembl	ENSG00000185019	ENSMUSG00000027300
UniProt	O94941	Q925F4
RefSeq (mRNA)	NM_199415; NM_001267584; NM_014948	NM_001255993; NM_001255994; NM_080562
RefSeq (protein)	NP_001254513; NP_055763; NP_955447	NP_001242922; NP_001242923; NP_542129
Location (UCSC)	Chr 20: 3.11 – 3.16 Mb	Chr 2: 130.43 – 130.47 Mb
PubMed search
- Wikidata
View/Edit Human	View/Edit Mouse

RING finger protein 37 is a protein that in humans is encoded by the UBOX5 gene.

== Interactions ==
UBOX5 has been shown to interact with UBE2L3.
