= ARIH1 =

Protein-coding gene in humans

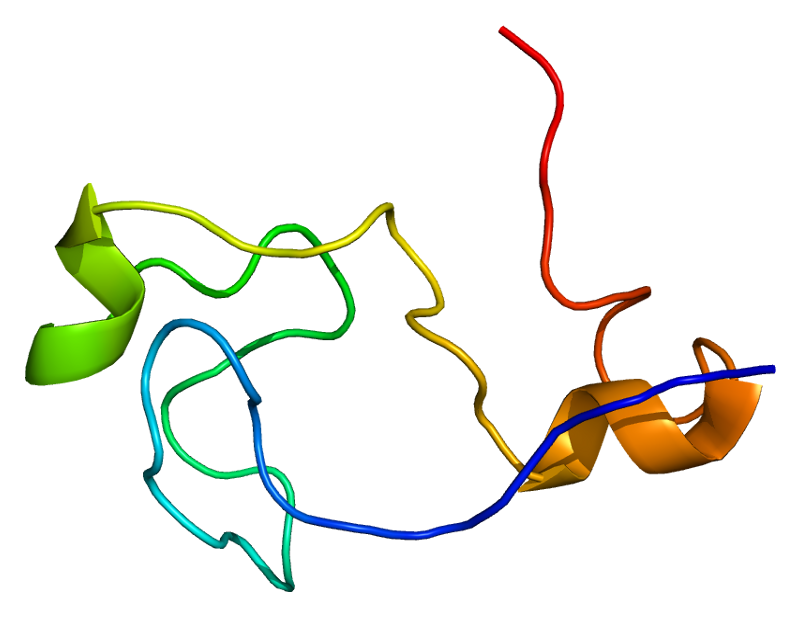

Identifiers
- Aliases: ARIH1, ARI, HARI, HHARI, UBCH7BP, ariadne RBR E3 ubiquitin protein ligase 1
- External IDs: OMIM: 605624; MGI: 1344363; GeneCards: ARIH1
Available structures
PDB	Ortholog search: PDBe RCSB
PDB	List of PDB id codes 1WD2, 2M9Y, 4KBL, 4KC9
Enzyme activity
EC #	BRENDA	ExPASy	KEGG	MetaCyc
2.3.2.31	↗	↗	↗	↗

Gene location (Human)
Chr.	Chromosome 15 (human)
Band	15q24.1	Start	72,474,330 bp
Band	15q24.1	End	72,602,987 bp

Gene location (Mouse)
Chr.	Chromosome 9 (mouse)
Band	9|9 B	Start	59,295,541 bp
Band	9|9 B	End	59,393,901 bp
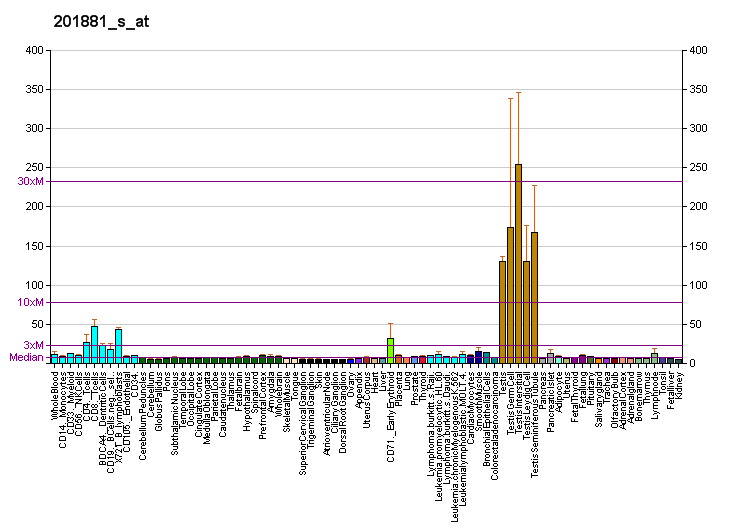

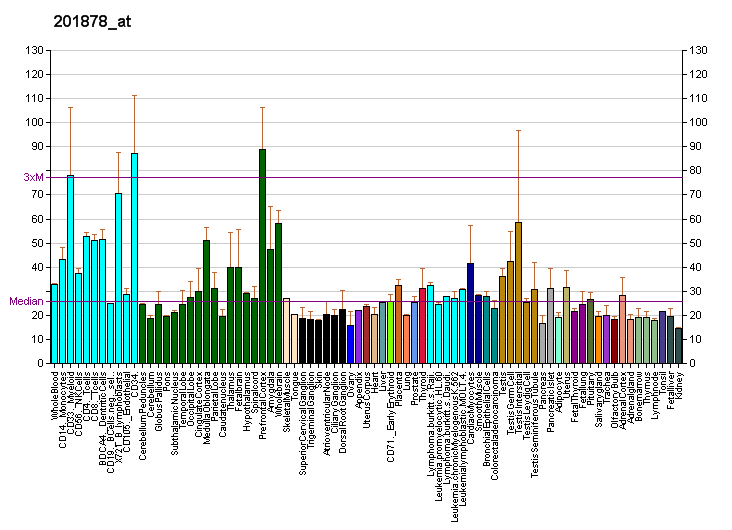

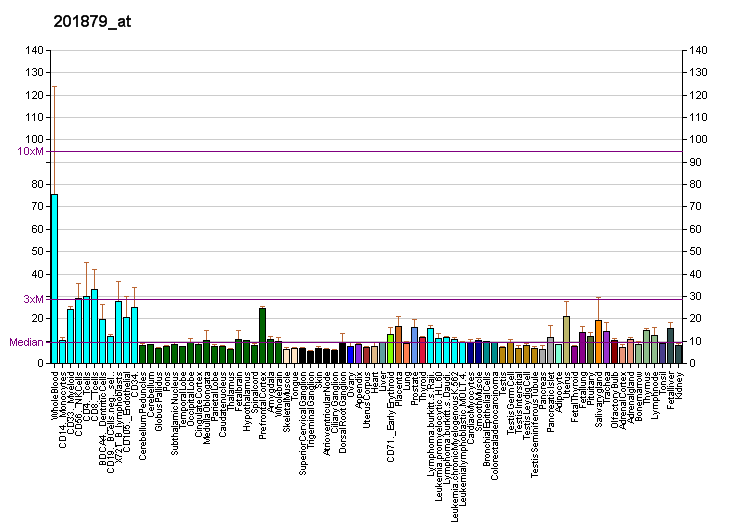
RNA expression pattern
Bgee	Human / Mouse (ortholog); Top expressed in: secondary oocyte; left testis; right testis; ventricular zone; sural nerve; ganglionic eminence; epithelium of colon; stromal cell of endometrium; muscle of thigh; Achilles tendon / Top expressed in: zygote; secondary oocyte; seminiferous tubule; extensor digitorum longus muscle; spermatid; plantaris muscle; neural layer of retina; triceps brachii muscle; tail of embryo; temporal muscle; More reference expression data
BioGPS	More reference expression data
Gene ontology
Molecular function	ubiquitin-like protein transferase activity; protein binding; metal ion binding; ubiquitin protein ligase activity; ubiquitin protein ligase binding; ubiquitin-protein transferase activity; transferase activity; ubiquitin conjugating enzyme binding; zinc ion binding
Cellular component	cytoplasm; ubiquitin ligase complex; cytosol; nucleus; Cajal body; nuclear body; SCF ubiquitin ligase complex; Cul2-RING ubiquitin ligase complex; Cul3-RING ubiquitin ligase complex; Cul4A-RING E3 ubiquitin ligase complex; Lewy body
Biological process	protein polyubiquitination; positive regulation of proteasomal ubiquitin-dependent protein catabolic process; protein ubiquitination; ubiquitin-dependent protein catabolic process
Sources:Amigo / QuickGO
Orthologs
Databases	NCBI: entry; OMA: entry
Species	Human	Mouse
Entrez	25820	23806
Ensembl	ENSG00000166233	ENSMUSG00000025234
UniProt	Q9Y4X5	Q9Z1K5
RefSeq (mRNA)	NM_005744	NM_019927
RefSeq (protein)	NP_005735	NP_064311
Location (UCSC)	Chr 15: 72.47 – 72.6 Mb	Chr 9: 59.3 – 59.39 Mb
PubMed search
- Wikidata
View/Edit Human	View/Edit Mouse

Protein ariadne-1 homolog is a protein that in humans is encoded by the ARIH1 gene.

== Interactions ==
ARIH1 has been shown to interact with:

- EIF4E2, and
- UBE2L3.
