= ARIH2 =

Protein-coding gene in humans

Identifiers
- Aliases: ARIH2, ARI2, TRIAD1, ariadne RBR E3 ubiquitin protein ligase 2
- External IDs: OMIM: 605615; MGI: 1344361; GeneCards: ARIH2
Enzyme activity
EC #	BRENDA	ExPASy	KEGG	MetaCyc
2.3.2.31	↗	↗	↗	↗

Gene location (Mouse)
Chr.	Chromosome 9 (mouse)
Band	9|9 F2	Start	108,480,141 bp
Band	9|9 F2	End	108,526,585 bp
Gene ontology
Molecular function	ubiquitin protein ligase activity; metal ion binding; ubiquitin-protein transferase activity; protein binding; transferase activity; ubiquitin conjugating enzyme binding; zinc ion binding
Cellular component	cytoplasm; nucleus; nucleoplasm; Cul5-RING ubiquitin ligase complex
Biological process	developmental cell growth; positive regulation of protein targeting to mitochondrion; protein K63-linked ubiquitination; hematopoietic stem cell proliferation; protein polyubiquitination; multicellular organism development; protein K48-linked ubiquitination; positive regulation of proteasomal ubiquitin-dependent protein catabolic process; protein ubiquitination; ubiquitin-dependent protein catabolic process
Sources:Amigo / QuickGO
Orthologs
Databases	NCBI: entry; OMA: entry
Species	Human	Mouse
Entrez	10425	23807
Ensembl	ENSG00000177479	ENSMUSG00000064145
UniProt	O95376	Q9Z1K6
RefSeq (mRNA)	NM_006321; NM_001317333; NM_001317334	NM_011790; NM_001357283; NM_001357285; NM_001357286
RefSeq (protein)	NP_001304262; NP_001304263; NP_006312; NP_001336138; NP_001336139 NP_001336140; NP_001336141; NP_001336142; NP_001336143; NP_001336144; NP_001336145; NP_001336146; NP_001336147; NP_001336148; NP_001336149; NP_001336150; NP_001336151; NP_001336152; NP_001336153; NP_001336154; NP_001336155; NP_001336156; NP_001336157; NP_001336158; NP_001336159	NP_035920; NP_001344212; NP_001344214; NP_001344215
Location (UCSC)	n/a	Chr 9: 108.48 – 108.53 Mb
PubMed search
- Wikidata
View/Edit Human	View/Edit Mouse

Protein ariadne-2 homolog is a protein that is encoded by the ARIH2 gene in humans.

== Function ==
ARIH2 influences development of Mll-Ell-induced acute myeloid leukemia and regulates the proliferation, DNA damage and chemosensitivity of gastric cancer cells by reducing the stability of p21 via ubiquitination, ARIH2 Ubiquitinates NLRP3 and Negatively Regulates NLRP3 Inflammasome Activation in Macrophages.
