= C1orf122 =

Protein-coding gene in humans

Identifiers
- Aliases: C1orf122, ALAESM, chromosome 1 open reading frame 122
- External IDs: MGI: 1916170; GeneCards: C1orf122

Gene location (Human)
Chr.	Chromosome 1 (human)
Band	1p34.3	Start	37,806,979 bp
Band	1p34.3	End	37,809,454 bp

Gene location (Mouse)
Chr.	Chromosome 4 (mouse)
Band	4|4 D2.2	Start	124,742,873 bp
Band	4|4 D2.2	End	124,744,989 bp
RNA expression pattern
Bgee	Human / Mouse (ortholog); Top expressed in: C1 segment; inferior ganglion of vagus nerve; substantia nigra; amygdala; pons; ventral tegmental area; medulla oblongata; superior vestibular nucleus; hypothalamus; subthalamic nucleus / Top expressed in: spermatocyte; seminiferous tubule; spermatid; endocardial cushion; seminal vesicula; subdivision of hippocampus; Region I of hippocampus proper; otolith organ; utricle; dorsal striatum; More reference expression data
BioGPS	n/a
Orthologs
Databases	NCBI: entry; OMA: entry
Species	Human	Mouse
Entrez	127687	68920
Ensembl	ENSG00000197982	ENSMUSG00000078570
UniProt	Q6ZSJ8	B1ARW8
RefSeq (mRNA)	NM_198446; NM_001142726	NM_001142727; NM_001347196
RefSeq (protein)	NP_001136198; NP_940848	NP_001136199; NP_001334125; NP_001390983; NP_001390984; NP_001390985 NP_001390986
Location (UCSC)	Chr 1: 37.81 – 37.81 Mb	Chr 4: 124.74 – 124.74 Mb
PubMed search
- Wikidata
View/Edit Human	View/Edit Mouse

C1orf122 (Chromosome 1 open reading frame 122) is a gene in the human genome that encodes the cytosolic protein ALAESM.. ALAESM is present in all tissue cells and highly up-regulated in the brain, spinal cord, adrenal gland and kidney. This gene can be expressed up to 2.5 times the average gene in its highly expressed tissues. Although the function of C1orf122 is unknown, it is predicted to be used for mitochondria localization.

== Gene ==
C1orf122 is located on chromosome 1 at 1p34.3. The gene is 1,665 nucleotides long, covering 37,808,405 to 37,809,454. It contains three exons with boundaries between amino acids 12 and 13, and amino acids 79 and 80.

== mRNA ==
C1orf122 has two isoforms. Variant one contains 1,329 nucleotides with three exons. Variant two contains 1,226 nucleotides with three exons. Variant two lacks an in-frame portion of the 5' coding region, resulting in a shorter N-terminus.

== Protein ==
ALAESM has a molecular weight of 1100 kDa and an isoelectric point of 6.29. It is a cytosolic protein without a transmembrane domain.

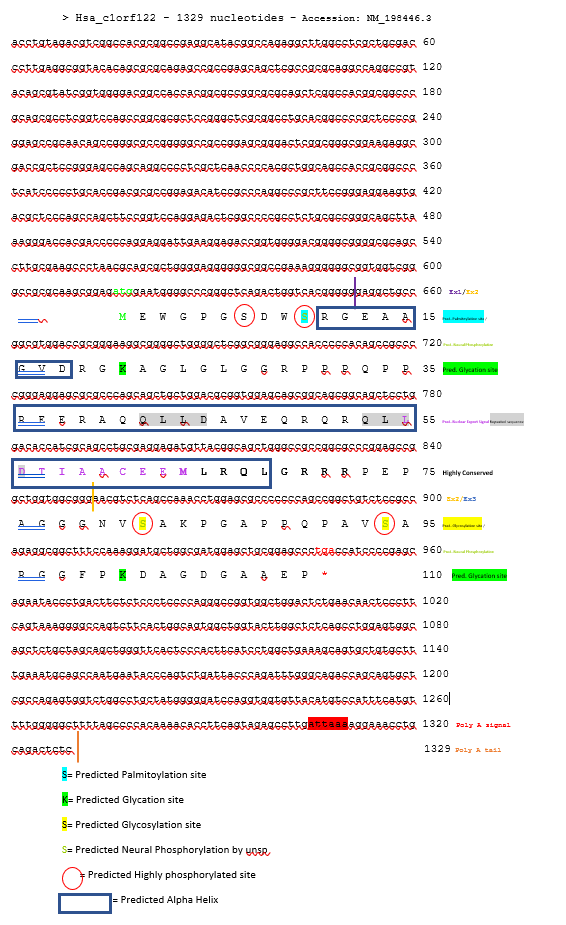
This conceptual translation shows various points of interest in the C1orf122 gene.

=== Predicted post-translational modifications ===
There are few predicted kinase phosphorylation sites in this protein. Position 7 is predicted to be phosphorylated by CK1, VRK, and VRK2. Position 10 is predicted to be phosphorylated by CRK1, VRK, PKC, PLK, and AGC. Position 82 has a possible phosphorylation by TKL and MLK. Position 94 is predicted to be phosphorylated by PKC, AGC, MAPK, NEK, CMGC and IKK.

ALAESM does have a few predicted reactive sites. It is predicted to be palmitoylated at position 10, allowing the covalent attachment of fatty acids. It is predicted to undergo glycation at positions 21 and 101 which attaches a sugar molecule to the amino acid. It is predicted to have a nuclear export signal strand from position 55-64 which signals the protein to leave the nucleus. It likely can be glycosylated at position 82 and 94 which attaches a carbohydrate to the amino acid. It is predicted to be phosphorylated by an unspecified actor at position 10, 82, and 94 in the nucleus.

== Structure ==
The secondary structure of ALAESM is predicted to be structured as 55% random coil, 35% alpha helix and 9% extended strand. There are two alpha helices between positions 11-18 and 36-68. There are three 2 amino acid sections after position 80 and one 4 amino acid section at position 20 of extended strand. The rest of the protein is random coil. There is no transmembrane domain within ALAESM

== Expression ==
ALAESM is expressed throughout all tissue cells in the body. It is also expressed up to 2.5 times higher than its average level in the brain, spinal cord, adrenal gland and kidneys. The protein is expressed in the cytoplasm and since it is predicted to have a nuclear export signal, it is kept in the cytoplasm even in telophase when the nuclear envelope disassembles.

== Homology ==
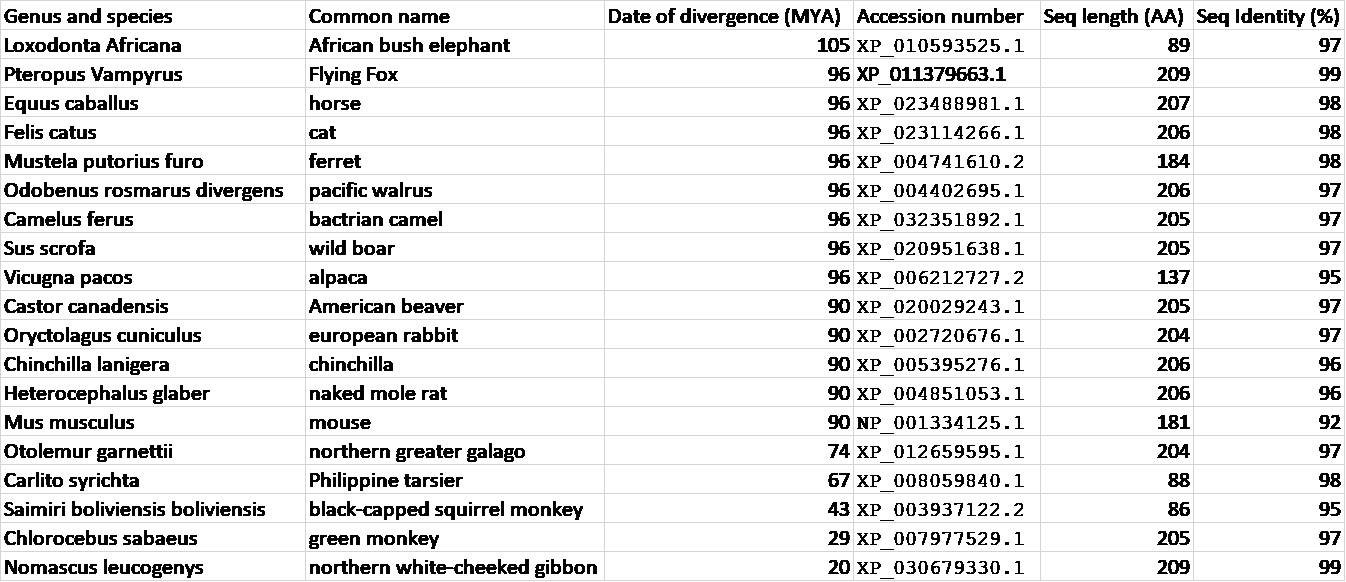
This graph shows the date of divergence, sequence length, and sequence identity for the orthologs of the human gene C1orf122.

Human C1orf122 does not have any paralogs, however it has multiple orthologs amongst placental mammals. These species range from cats, horses, rabbits, alpacas, and elephants. The sequence across these species are highly conserved.
