= ARL6IP6 =

Protein-coding gene in humans

Identifiers
- Aliases: ARL6IP6, AIP-6, PFAAP1, AIP6, ADP ribosylation factor like GTPase 6 interacting protein 6
- External IDs: OMIM: 616495; MGI: 1929507; GeneCards: ARL6IP6

Gene location (Mouse)
Chr.	Chromosome 2 (mouse)
Band	2|2 C1.1	Start	53,081,738 bp
Band	2|2 C1.1	End	53,109,232 bp
Orthologs
Databases	NCBI: entry; OMA: entry
Species	Human	Mouse
Entrez	151188	65103
Ensembl	ENSG00000177917	ENSMUSG00000026960
UniProt	Q8N6S5	Q8BH07
RefSeq (mRNA)	NM_152522	NM_022989
RefSeq (protein)	NP_689735; NP_001336997; NP_001358901	NP_075365
Location (UCSC)	n/a	Chr 2: 53.08 – 53.11 Mb
PubMed search
- Wikidata
View/Edit Human	View/Edit Mouse

ADP ribosylation factor like GTPase 6 interacting protein 6 is a protein that in the humans is encoded by the ARL6IP6 gene. It spans from 152,717,893 to 152,761,253 on the plus strand.

== Gene ==
=== General properties ===
ARL6IP6 Also known as Phosphonoformate Immuno-Associated Protein 1. It has 43,361 bases and 11 exons and is located on the long arm of chromosome 2, at 2q23.3 in humans. In humans there are three upstream genes (PRPF40A, FMNL2 and STAM2) and three downstream genes (GALNT13, KCNJ3, NR4A2) that define the identity of this genomic region.

=== Structure ===
ARL6IP6 protein is approximately 226 amino acids in length. The ARL6IP6 gene undergoes alternative splicing, post transcription, that results in multiple transcript variants. These variants encode protein isoforms of different lengths that include isoforms of 226, 195 and 130 amino acids. Isoforms, which are variations in protein structure and function produced by the same gene, indicate that the ARL6IP6 protein may have varying functions depending on the tissue or environment it is synthesized in. As of this moment, the differences between ARL6IP6 isoforms and their respective function remain unknown. No three-dimensional structure of ARL6IP6 has been confirmed.

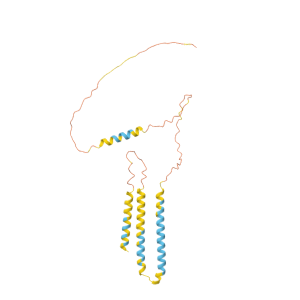
Predicted three-dimensional structure of the human ARL6IP6 protein generated using AlphaFold. This structure is computationally predicted and has not been experimentally validated.

=== Function ===
The exact function of ARL6IP6 is unknown. ARL6IP6 is known to interact with ADP-ribosylation factor-like (ARL) proteins, which are members of GTPases family that play roles in intracellular membrane transportation. Proteins that interact with these ARL proteins are typically involved in regulation of these processes. Based on this association, ARL6IP6 may play a role in membrane-related or intracellular transport pathways. Proteomic analyses suggested that ARL6IP6 localized to the inner nuclear membrane of certain mesenchymal cells, including adipocytes and myocytes. The location of ARL6IP indicates possible involvement in nuclear envelopment organization or nucleocytoplasmic signaling processes.

Additionally, an increase in the expression of ARL6IP6 in cumulus cells has been documented in aged mares when compared to younger animals. This suggests that a link to age related declines in oocyte quality is possible. Furthermore, in pigs, post transcriptional regulation of ARL6IP6 has been observed where it has been targeted by microRNA miR-26 during Salmonella infection. This indicates a potential role in the immune or inflammatory response pathways.

Members of the ARF and ARL family of small GTPases are known to regulate the curvature of membrane, vesicles, and intracellular movement between organelles like Golgi apparatus, endoplasmic reticulum, and endosomes. These functions are a must for cell organization, sorting of proteins, and signal transduction. Proteins that engage with ARL family members are usually adaptors or regulatory factors that help coordinate those pathways.

Based on the localization in the inner nuclear membrane and tits interaction with the ARL family, ARL6IP6 may play a role in processes related to membrane organization or the communication between cytoplasm and the nucleus. Nucleocytoplasmic transport, structural maintenance of nuclear envelope and regulation of signaling pathways that depend on membrane dynamics are all possible processes included.

Despite these possible roles, direct experimental evidence defining the function of ARL6IP6 remains very limited. The gene lacks studies that fully dissect its function and further research is needed.

==== Expression ====
Analyses of the expression, point to ARL6IP6 being present in multiple tissue types which suggest a broad role in human physiology. Data from large-scale sequencing studies detected expression in tissues including the brain, heart and immune-related tissues that suggest it is not restricted to a single organ system.

Genes with a wide array of expression patterns are often involved in fundamental cell process like intracellular transportation, signaling or structural maintenance. The presence of ARL6IP6 in both neural and non-neural tissues is consistent with an association with membrane related and intracellular pathways.

Studies in non-human organisms support a broad expression profile. As an example, an increases expression of ARL6IP6 has been observes in cumulus cells from aged mares compared to younger animals, this suggests that the expression levels change in response to physiological conditions, like aging. Although, these findings provide insight into possible regulatory patterns, these may be different in human biology.

== Clinical significance ==
ARL6IP6 mutations have been linked to both neurological and vascular malfunctions. A 2015 study reported a patient with a loss-of-function mutation who presented with cutis marmorata telangiectatic congenita (CMTC), which resulted in vascular abnormalities, developmental delays and transient ischemic attacks (strokes). Literature reviews have reported mutations in additional patients with CMTC and strokes but the functional consequences of these mutations remain unknown. Additionally, a genome-wide study identified a single nucleotide polymorphism (SNP), rs1986743, located in an intron of ARL6IP6 that displayed suggestive association (P = 2.7 × 10^{−7}) with early onset ischemic stroke, but did not reach genome-wide significance.

The ARL6IP6 gene may acquire both rare mutations and common genetic variants which can create a variety of phenotypes. Loss-of-function mutations are usually rare and linked to severe conditions while common variants contribute to diseases on a smaller scale. The existence of both types of variation in ARL6IP6 suggests that it may play a role in both rare Mendelian disorders and other complex diseases like vascular disease. Additional studies are needed to replicate these findings and to determine the mechanisms that link ARL6IP6 to these conditions
