= AP1AR =

Protein-coding gene in the species Homo sapiens

Identifiers
- Aliases: AP1AR, 2C18, C4orf16, GBAR, gamma-BAR, PRO0971, adaptor related protein complex 1 associated regulatory protein
- External IDs: OMIM: 610851; MGI: 2384822; HomoloGene: 10236; GeneCards: AP1AR; OMA:AP1AR - orthologs

Gene location (Human)
Chr.	Chromosome 4 (human)
Band	4q25	Start	112,231,740 bp
Band	4q25	End	112,273,110 bp

Gene location (Mouse)
Chr.	Chromosome 3 (mouse)
Band	3|3 G2	Start	127,600,656 bp
Band	3|3 G2	End	127,631,172 bp
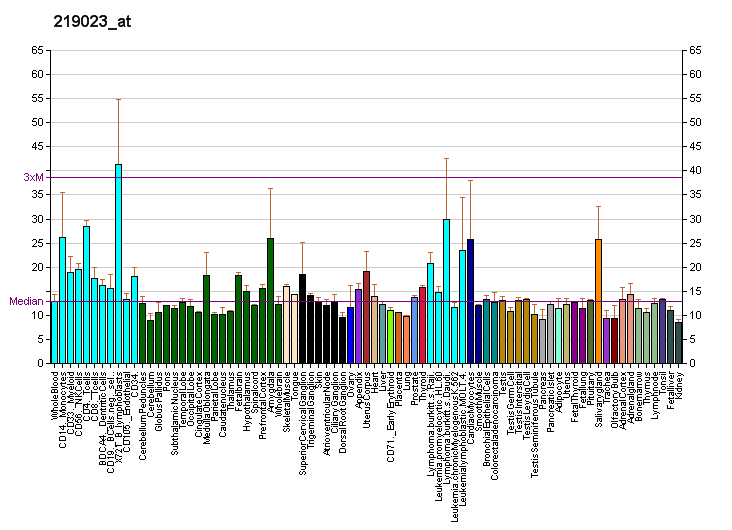
RNA expression pattern
Bgee	Human / Mouse (ortholog); Top expressed in: Achilles tendon; ganglionic eminence; jejunal mucosa; rectum; monocyte; testicle; ventricular zone; mucosa of sigmoid colon; stromal cell of endometrium; islet of Langerhans / Top expressed in: trigeminal ganglion; epithelium of small intestine; conjunctival fornix; vestibular membrane of cochlear duct; dorsal striatum; Ileal epithelium; primitive streak; corneal stroma; entorhinal cortex; vestibular sensory epithelium; More reference expression data
BioGPS	More reference expression data
Gene ontology
Molecular function	kinesin binding; AP-1 adaptor complex binding
Cellular component	late endosome; Golgi apparatus; early endosome; transport vesicle; cytosol; endosome
Biological process	protein transport; negative regulation of cell motility; negative regulation of substrate adhesion-dependent cell spreading; regulation of Arp2/3 complex-mediated actin nucleation; negative regulation of receptor recycling; vesicle targeting, trans-Golgi to endosome
Sources:Amigo / QuickGO
Orthologs
Species	Human	Mouse
Entrez	55435	211556
Ensembl	ENSG00000138660	ENSMUSG00000074238
UniProt	Q63HQ0	n/a
RefSeq (mRNA)	NM_001128426; NM_018569	NM_145964; NM_001346718
RefSeq (protein)	NP_001121898; NP_061039	n/a
Location (UCSC)	Chr 4: 112.23 – 112.27 Mb	Chr 3: 127.6 – 127.63 Mb
PubMed search
- Wikidata
View/Edit Human	View/Edit Mouse

AP-1 complex-associated regulatory protein (Gamma1-adaptin brefeldin A resistance protein) is a protein that in humans is encoded by the AP1AR gene.
