= ABRAXAS2 =

Protein-coding gene in the species Homo sapiens

Identifiers
- Aliases: ABRAXAS2, ABRO1, KIAA0157, FAM175B, family with sequence similarity 175 member B, abraxas 2, BRISC complex subunit
- External IDs: OMIM: 611144; MGI: 1926116; GeneCards: ABRAXAS2

Gene location (Human)
| Chr. | Chromosome 10 (human) |
| Band | 10q26.13 | Start | 124,801,819 bp |
| Band | 10q26.13 | End | 124,836,667 bp |

Gene location (Mouse)
| Chr. | Chromosome 7 (mouse) |
| Band | 7|7 F3 | Start | 132,460,954 bp |
| Band | 7|7 F3 | End | 132,486,840 bp |
RNA expression pattern
| Bgee | Human / Mouse (ortholog); Top expressed in: secondary oocyte; middle temporal gyrus; Skeletal muscle tissue of biceps brachii; Brodmann area 23; gonad; deltoid muscle; gastrocnemius muscle; Achilles tendon; parietal pleura; visceral pleura / Top expressed in: Paneth cell; superior cervical ganglion; otolith organ; utricle; hand; ureter; foot; temporal muscle; facial motor nucleus; genital tubercle; More reference expression data |
| BioGPS | n/a |
Gene ontology
| Molecular function | microtubule binding; polyubiquitin modification-dependent protein binding; protein binding |
| Cellular component | cytoplasm; centrosome; spindle pole; BRISC complex; spindle pole centrosome; midbody; microtubule; cytoskeleton; nucleus; microtubule minus-end; cytosol |
| Biological process | chromosome segregation; cell division; mitotic spindle assembly; response to ischemia; protein K63-linked deubiquitination; cell cycle; attachment of spindle microtubules to kinetochore; protein deubiquitination; mitotic cell cycle |
Sources:Amigo / QuickGO
Orthologs
| Databases | NCBI: entry; OMA: entry |
| Species | Human | Mouse |
| Entrez | 23172 | 109359 |
| Ensembl | ENSG00000165660 | ENSMUSG00000030965 |
| UniProt | Q15018 | Q3TCJ1 |
| RefSeq (mRNA) | NM_032182 | NM_198017 |
| RefSeq (protein) | NP_115558 | NP_932134 |
| Location (UCSC) | Chr 10: 124.8 – 124.84 Mb | Chr 7: 132.46 – 132.49 Mb |
| PubMed search |
- Wikidata
| View/Edit Human | View/Edit Mouse |

BRISC complex subunit Abraxas 2 is a protein that in humans is encoded by the gene ABRAXAS2 (previously FAM175B or KIAA0157). Abraxas 2 is involved in deubiquitination as part of the BRISC complex.
