= Alpha 1,3-galactosyltransferase 2 =

Protein found in humans

A3GALT2

Identifiers
- Aliases: A3GALT2, A3GALT2P, IGBS3S, IGB3S, alpha 1,3-galactosyltransferase 2
- External IDs: MGI: 2685279; GeneCards: A3GALT2
Enzyme activity
EC #	BRENDA	ExPASy	KEGG	MetaCyc
2.4.1.87	↗	↗	↗	↗

Gene location (Human)
Chr.	Chromosome 1 (human)
Band	1p35.1	Start	33,306,766 bp
Band	1p35.1	End	33,321,098 bp

Gene location (Mouse)
Chr.	Chromosome 4 (mouse)
Band	4|4 D2.2	Start	128,649,157 bp
Band	4|4 D2.2	End	128,663,091 bp
RNA expression pattern
Bgee	Human / Mouse (ortholog); Top expressed in: testicle; blood; gastric mucosa; granulocyte; left uterine tube; cerebellar hemisphere; right hemisphere of cerebellum; gastrocnemius muscle; mucosa of transverse colon; thoracic aorta / Top expressed in: epiblast; embryo; ganglionic eminence; ventricular zone; neural layer of retina; cerebellar cortex; lens; muscle of thigh; adrenal gland; genital tubercle; More reference expression data
BioGPS	n/a
Gene ontology
Molecular function	transferase activity; metal ion binding; N-acetyllactosaminide 3-alpha-galactosyltransferase activity; alpha-1,3-galactosyltransferase activity; hexosyltransferase activity; glycosyltransferase activity
Cellular component	membrane; Golgi cisterna membrane; integral component of membrane; Golgi apparatus; vesicle
Biological process	glycosphingolipid biosynthetic process; glycolipid biosynthetic process; lipid glycosylation; carbohydrate metabolic process; cellular response to manganese ion
Sources:Amigo / QuickGO
Orthologs
Databases	NCBI: entry; OMA: entry
Species	Human	Mouse
Entrez	127550	215493
Ensembl	ENSG00000184389	ENSMUSG00000028794
UniProt	U3KPV4	Q3V1N9
RefSeq (mRNA)	NM_001080438	NM_001009819
RefSeq (protein)	NP_001073907	NP_001009819
Location (UCSC)	Chr 1: 33.31 – 33.32 Mb	Chr 4: 128.65 – 128.66 Mb
PubMed search
- Wikidata
View/Edit Human	View/Edit Mouse

Alpha 1,3-galactosyltransferase 2 is a protein that in humans is encoded by the A3GALT2 gene.
