= Thioesterase =

Class of enzymes which split thiol esters into an acid and alcohol

In biochemistry, thioesterases are enzymes which belong to the esterase family. Esterases, in turn, are one type of the several hydrolases known.

Thioesterases exhibit esterase activity (splitting of an ester into an acid and an alcohol, in the presence of water) specifically at a thiol group (−SH).

Thioesterases or thiolester hydrolases are identified as members of EC 3.1.2.-.

== Family ==
The thioesterase activity is performed by members of the acyl-CoA thioesterase (ACOT) family. The regulatory role of ACOT in fatty acid metabolism depends on their substrate specificity, tissue expression and subcellular localization. For example, deactivation of fatty acids at the ER may traffic fatty acids away from pathways associated with the ER membrane, such as glycerolipid biosynthesis. Two structurally different ACOT types lead to a similar enzymatic activity in vitro, dividing the family into type I and type II ACOTs.

Type I ACOTs (ACOT1–6) contain the α/β-hydrolase domain, which is also present in many lipases and esterases.

Type II ACOTs (ACOT7–15) have a characteristic structural motif called the ‘Hotdog fold’ domain.

== Examples ==
Acetyl-CoA hydrolase, palmitoyl-CoA hydrolase, succinyl-CoA hydrolase, formyl-CoA hydrolase, acyl-CoA hydrolase are a few examples of this group of enzymes.

Ubiquitin thiolesterase is a well-known example, whose structure has been analyzed.

Humans genes which encode thioesterases include:

ACOT1, ACOT2, ACOT4, ACOT6, ACOT7, ACOT8, ACOT9, ACOT11 (STARD14), ACOT12 (STARD15), OLAH, PPT1, PPT2, THEM2 (ACOT13), THEM4, THEM4P1, THEM5
