= Glycerophosphohydrolase =

Glycerophosphohydrolase may refer to:

- Glycerophosphoinositol glycerophosphodiesterase
- Glycerophosphocholine phosphodiesterase
- Glycerol-1,2-cyclic-phosphate 2-phosphodiesterase
- Glycerophosphodiester phosphodiesterase
