= ACOT1 =

Protein-coding gene in the species Homo sapiens

Identifiers
- Aliases: ACOT1, ACH2, CTE-1, LACH2, acyl-CoA thioesterase 1
- External IDs: OMIM: 614313; MGI: 2159619; GeneCards: ACOT1
Enzyme activity
EC #	BRENDA	ExPASy	KEGG	MetaCyc
3.1.2.2	↗	↗	↗	↗

Gene location (Human)
Chr.	Chromosome 14 (human)
Band	14q24.3	Start	73,537,143 bp
Band	14q24.3	End	73,543,796 bp

Gene location (Mouse)
Chr.	Chromosome 12 (mouse)
Band	12|12 D1	Start	84,098,918 bp
Band	12|12 D1	End	84,107,176 bp
RNA expression pattern
Bgee	Human / Mouse (ortholog); Top expressed in: gonad; testicle; right lobe of liver; smooth muscle tissue; left ventricle; gastrocnemius muscle; apex of heart; gastric mucosa; human kidney; right adrenal gland / Top expressed in: zygote; secondary oocyte; primary oocyte; renal cortex; proximal tubule; human kidney; right kidney; salivary gland; hair; hepatobiliary system; More reference expression data
BioGPS	n/a
Gene ontology
Molecular function	palmitoyl-CoA hydrolase activity; carboxylic ester hydrolase activity; hydrolase activity; thiolester hydrolase activity; acyl-CoA hydrolase activity; myristoyl-CoA hydrolase activity
Cellular component	cytoplasm; cytosol
Biological process	very long-chain fatty acid metabolic process; long-chain fatty acid metabolic process; acyl-CoA metabolic process; fatty acid metabolic process; lipid metabolism
Sources:Amigo / QuickGO
Orthologs
Databases	NCBI: entry; OMA: entry
Species	Human	Mouse
Entrez	641371	171281
Ensembl	ENSG00000184227	ENSMUSG00000021228
UniProt	Q86TX2	Q9QYR7
RefSeq (mRNA)	NM_001037161	NM_134246; NM_001346701
RefSeq (protein)	NP_001032238	NP_001333630; NP_599007
Location (UCSC)	Chr 14: 73.54 – 73.54 Mb	Chr 12: 84.1 – 84.11 Mb
PubMed search
- Wikidata
View/Edit Human	View/Edit Mouse

Acyl-CoA thioesterase 1 is a protein that in humans is encoded by the ACOT1 gene.

== Structure ==
The ACOT1 gene is located on the 14th chromosome, with its specific localization being 14q24.3. It contains 7 exons.

The protein encoded by this gene contains 410 amino acids, and forms a homodimer with another chain. The protein contains a StAR-related transfer domain, which is a domain responsible for binding to lipids. There are 4 known ligands that bind to this homodimer: polyethylene glycol, chlorine, glycerol, and a form of TCEP.

== Function ==
The protein encoded by the ACOT1 gene is part of a family of Acyl-CoA thioesterases, which catalyze the hydrolysis of various Coenzyme A esters of various molecules to the free acid plus CoA. These enzymes have also been referred to in the literature as acyl-CoA hydrolases, acyl-CoA thioester hydrolases, and palmitoyl-CoA hydrolases. The reaction carried out by these enzymes is as follows:

CoA ester + H_{2}O → free acid + coenzyme A

These enzymes use the same substrates as long-chain acyl-CoA synthetases, but have a unique purpose in that they generate the free acid and CoA, as opposed to long-chain acyl-CoA synthetases, which ligate fatty acids to CoA, to produce the CoA ester. The role of the ACOT- family of enzymes is not well understood; however, it has been suggested that they play a crucial role in regulating the intracellular levels of CoA esters, Coenzyme A, and free fatty acids. Recent studies have shown that Acyl-CoA esters have many more functions than simply an energy source. These functions include allosteric regulation of enzymes such as acetyl-CoA carboxylase, hexokinase IV, and the citrate condensing enzyme. Long-chain acyl-CoAs also regulate opening of ATP-sensitive potassium channels and activation of Calcium ATPases, thereby regulating insulin secretion. A number of other cellular events are also mediated via acyl-CoAs, for example signal transduction through protein kinase C, inhibition of retinoic acid-induced apoptosis, and involvement in budding and fusion of the endomembrane system. Acyl-CoAs also mediate protein targeting to various membranes and regulation of G protein α subunits, because they are substrates for protein acylation. In the mitochondria, acyl-CoA esters are involved in the acylation of mitochondrial NAD+ dependent dehydrogenases; because these enzymes are responsible for amino acid catabolism, this acylation renders the whole process inactive. This mechanism may provide metabolic crosstalk and act to regulate the NADH/NAD+ ratio in order to maintain optimal mitochondrial beta oxidation of fatty acids. The role of CoA esters in lipid metabolism and numerous other intracellular processes are well defined, and thus it is hypothesized that ACOT- enzymes play a role in modulating the processes these metabolites are involved in.
