= ACOT6 =

Protein-coding gene in humans

Identifiers
- Aliases: ACOT6, C14orf42, c14_5530, acyl-CoA thioesterase 6
- External IDs: OMIM: 614267; MGI: 1921287; GeneCards: ACOT6

Gene location (Human)
Chr.	Chromosome 14 (human)
Band	14q24.3	Start	73,610,945 bp
Band	14q24.3	End	73,619,888 bp

Gene location (Mouse)
Chr.	Chromosome 12 (mouse)
Band	12|12 D1	Start	84,147,428 bp
Band	12|12 D1	End	84,158,123 bp
RNA expression pattern
Bgee	Human / Mouse (ortholog); Top expressed in: testicle; right lobe of liver; nucleus accumbens; human kidney; cerebellar hemisphere; right hemisphere of cerebellum; caudate nucleus; putamen; amygdala; right frontal lobe / Top expressed in: splanchnocranium; Meckel's cartilage; sphenoid bone; basisphenoid; rib; epithelium of small intestine; thyroid cartilage; hyoid bone; occiput; basilar part of occipital bone; More reference expression data
BioGPS	n/a
Gene ontology
Molecular function	carboxylic ester hydrolase activity; hydrolase activity; acyl-CoA hydrolase activity
Cellular component	cytosol; cytoplasm; peroxisomal matrix
Biological process	fatty acid metabolic process; acyl-CoA metabolic process
Sources:Amigo / QuickGO
Orthologs
Databases	NCBI: entry; OMA: entry
Species	Human	Mouse
Entrez	641372	217700
Ensembl	ENSG00000205669	ENSMUSG00000043487
UniProt	Q3I5F7	Q32Q92
RefSeq (mRNA)	NM_001037162; NM_001365788; NM_001365789	NM_172580
RefSeq (protein)	NP_001032239; NP_001352717; NP_001352718	NP_766168
Location (UCSC)	Chr 14: 73.61 – 73.62 Mb	Chr 12: 84.15 – 84.16 Mb
PubMed search
- Wikidata
View/Edit Human	View/Edit Mouse

Acyl-CoA thioesterase 6 is a protein that in humans is encoded by the ACOT6 gene. The protein, also known as C14orf42, is an enzyme with thioesterase activity.

== Function ==
The protein encoded by the ACOT1 gene is part of a family of Acyl-CoA thioesterases, which catalyze the hydrolysis of various Coenzyme A esters of various molecules to the free acid plus CoA. These enzymes have also been referred to in the literature as acyl-CoA hydrolases, acyl-CoA thioester hydrolases, and palmitoyl-CoA hydrolases. The reaction carried out by these enzymes is as follows:

CoA ester + H_{2}O → free acid + coenzyme A

These enzymes use the same substrates as long-chain acyl-CoA synthetases, but have a unique purpose in that they generate the free acid and CoA, as opposed to long-chain acyl-CoA synthetases, which ligate fatty acids to CoA, to produce the CoA ester. The role of the ACOT- family of enzymes is not well understood; however, it has been suggested that they play a crucial role in regulating the intracellular levels of CoA esters, Coenzyme A, and free fatty acids. Recent studies have shown that Acyl-CoA esters have many more functions than simply an energy source. These functions include allosteric regulation of enzymes such as acetyl-CoA carboxylase, hexokinase IV, and the citrate condensing enzyme. Long-chain acyl-CoAs also regulate opening of ATP-sensitive potassium channels and activation of Calcium ATPases, thereby regulating insulin secretion. A number of other cellular events are also mediated via acyl-CoAs, for example signal transduction through protein kinase C, inhibition of retinoic acid-induced apoptosis, and involvement in budding and fusion of the endomembrane system. Acyl-CoAs also mediate protein targeting to various membranes and regulation of G Protein α subunits, because they are substrates for protein acylation. In the mitochondria, acyl-CoA esters are involved in the acylation of mitochondrial NAD+ dependent dehydrogenases; because these enzymes are responsible for amino acid catabolism, this acylation renders the whole process inactive. This mechanism may provide metabolic crosstalk and act to regulate the NADH/NAD+ ratio in order to maintain optimal mitochondrial beta oxidation of fatty acids. The role of CoA esters in lipid metabolism and numerous other intracellular processes are well defined, and thus it is hypothesized that ACOT- enzymes play a role in modulating the processes these metabolites are involved in.
