= ACOT4 =

Protein-coding gene in the species Homo sapiens

Identifiers
- Aliases: ACOT4, PTE-Ib, PTE1B, PTE2B, acyl-CoA thioesterase 4
- External IDs: OMIM: 614314; MGI: 2159621; GeneCards: ACOT4
Available structures
PDB	Ortholog search: PDBe RCSB
PDB	List of PDB id codes 3K2I
Enzyme activity
EC #	BRENDA	ExPASy	KEGG	MetaCyc
3.1.2.2	↗	↗	↗	↗
3.1.2.3	↗	↗	↗	↗

Gene location (Human)
Chr.	Chromosome 14 (human)
Band	14q24.3	Start	73,591,873 bp
Band	14q24.3	End	73,595,766 bp

Gene location (Mouse)
Chr.	Chromosome 12 (mouse)
Band	12|12 D1	Start	84,085,153 bp
Band	12|12 D1	End	84,095,375 bp
RNA expression pattern
Bgee	Human / Mouse (ortholog); Top expressed in: mucosa of ileum; right lobe of liver; gonad; oocyte; testicle; human kidney; buccal mucosa cell; secondary oocyte; prefrontal cortex; jejunal mucosa / Top expressed in: right kidney; proximal tubule; zygote; lumbar subsegment of spinal cord; human kidney; hepatobiliary system; liver; epithelium of small intestine; yolk sac; duodenum; More reference expression data
BioGPS	n/a
Gene ontology
Molecular function	palmitoyl-CoA hydrolase activity; carboxylic ester hydrolase activity; succinyl-CoA hydrolase activity; signaling receptor binding; hydrolase activity; thiolester hydrolase activity; acyl-CoA hydrolase activity; myristoyl-CoA hydrolase activity
Cellular component	peroxisome; peroxisomal matrix; cytosol
Biological process	dicarboxylic acid metabolic process; butyrate metabolic process; succinyl-CoA metabolic process; unsaturated monocarboxylic acid metabolic process; very long-chain fatty acid metabolic process; short-chain fatty acid metabolic process; dicarboxylic acid catabolic process; saturated monocarboxylic acid metabolic process; long-chain fatty acid metabolic process; acyl-CoA metabolic process; protein targeting to peroxisome; fatty acid metabolic process; lipid metabolism; fatty acid biosynthetic process
Sources:Amigo / QuickGO
Orthologs
Databases	NCBI: entry; OMA: entry
Species	Human	Mouse
Entrez	122970	171282
Ensembl	ENSG00000177465	ENSMUSG00000052392
UniProt	Q8N9L9	Q8BWN8
RefSeq (mRNA)	NM_152331	NM_134247
RefSeq (protein)	NP_689544	NP_599008
Location (UCSC)	Chr 14: 73.59 – 73.6 Mb	Chr 12: 84.09 – 84.1 Mb
PubMed search
- Wikidata
View/Edit Human	View/Edit Mouse

Acyl-coenzyme A thioesterase 4 is an enzyme that in humans is encoded by the ACOT4 gene.

== Function ==
The protein encoded by the ACOT4 gene is part of a family of Acyl-CoA thioesterases, which catalyze the hydrolysis of various Coenzyme A esters of various molecules to the free acid plus CoA. These enzymes have also been referred to in the literature as acyl-CoA hydrolases, acyl-CoA thioester hydrolases, and palmitoyl-CoA hydrolases. The reaction carried out by these enzymes is as follows:

CoA ester + H_{2}O → free acid + coenzyme A

These enzymes use the same substrates as long-chain acyl-CoA synthetases, but have a unique purpose in that they generate the free acid and CoA, as opposed to long-chain acyl-CoA synthetases, which ligate fatty acids to CoA, to produce the CoA ester. The role of the ACOT- family of enzymes is not well understood; however, it has been suggested that they play a crucial role in regulating the intracellular levels of CoA esters, Coenzyme A, and free fatty acids. Recent studies have shown that Acyl-CoA esters have many more functions than simply an energy source. These functions include allosteric regulation of enzymes such as acetyl-CoA carboxylase, hexokinase IV, and the citrate condensing enzyme. Long-chain acyl-CoAs also regulate opening of ATP-sensitive potassium channels and activation of Calcium ATPases, thereby regulating insulin secretion. A number of other cellular events are also mediated via acyl-CoAs, for example signal transduction through protein kinase C, inhibition of retinoic acid-induced apoptosis, and involvement in budding and fusion of the endomembrane system. Acyl-CoAs also mediate protein targeting to various membranes and regulation of G Protein α subunits, because they are substrates for protein acylation. In the mitochondria, acyl-CoA esters are involved in the acylation of mitochondrial NAD+ dependent dehydrogenases; because these enzymes are responsible for amino acid catabolism, this acylation renders the whole process inactive. This mechanism may provide metabolic crosstalk and act to regulate the NADH/NAD+ ratio in order to maintain optimal mitochondrial beta oxidation of fatty acids. The role of CoA esters in lipid metabolism and numerous other intracellular processes are well defined, and thus it is hypothesized that ACOT- enzymes play a role in modulating the processes these metabolites are involved in.
