= Acyl-CoA thioesterase 9 =

Protein-coding gene in humans

ACOT9

Identifiers
- Aliases: ACOT9, ACATE2, MT-ACT48, MTACT48, CGI-16, Acyl-CoA thioesterase 9
- External IDs: OMIM: 300862; MGI: 1928939; GeneCards: ACOT9
Enzyme activity
EC #	BRENDA	ExPASy	KEGG	MetaCyc
3.1.2.2	↗	↗	↗	↗

Gene location (Human)
Chr.	X chromosome (human)
Band	Xp22.11	Start	23,701,055 bp
Band	Xp22.11	End	23,766,475 bp

Gene location (Mouse)
Chr.	X chromosome (mouse)
Band	X|X F3	Start	154,045,439 bp
Band	X|X F3	End	154,080,650 bp
RNA expression pattern
Bgee	Human / Mouse (ortholog); Top expressed in: secondary oocyte; Achilles tendon; left ventricle; monocyte; right auricle of heart; ascending aorta; gastric mucosa; right ventricle; right coronary artery; upper lobe of left lung / Top expressed in: endothelial cell of lymphatic vessel; hair follicle; decidua; facial motor nucleus; cornea; skin of external ear; atrioventricular valve; granulocyte; right kidney; gastrula; More reference expression data
BioGPS	n/a
Gene ontology
Molecular function	acetyl-CoA hydrolase activity; hydrolase activity; carboxylic ester hydrolase activity; acyl-CoA hydrolase activity
Cellular component	mitochondrial matrix; mitochondrion
Biological process	acyl-CoA metabolic process
Sources:Amigo / QuickGO
Orthologs
Databases	NCBI: entry; OMA: entry
Species	Human	Mouse
Entrez	23597	56360
Ensembl	ENSG00000123130	ENSMUSG00000025287
UniProt	Q9Y305	Q9R0X4
RefSeq (mRNA)	NM_001033583; NM_001037171; NM_001330259; NM_012332	NM_019736; NM_001313718
RefSeq (protein)	NP_001028755; NP_001032248; NP_001317188	NP_001300647; NP_062710
Location (UCSC)	Chr X: 23.7 – 23.77 Mb	Chr X: 154.05 – 154.08 Mb
PubMed search
- Wikidata
View/Edit Human	View/Edit Mouse

Acyl-CoA thioesterase 9 is a protein that is encoded by the human ACOT9 gene. It is a member of the acyl-CoA thioesterase superfamily, which is a group of enzymes that hydrolyze Coenzyme A esters. There is no known function, however it has been shown to act as a long-chain thioesterase at low concentrations, and a short-chain thioesterase at high concentrations.

== Gene ==
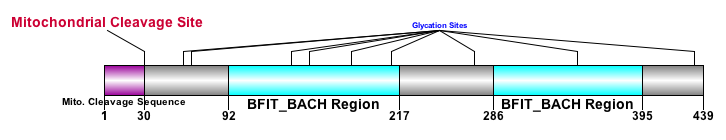
Depiction of ACOT9 gene

=== Locus ===
The ACOT9 gene is located at p22.11 on chromosome X. Located on the minus strand of the chromosome, the start is at 23,721,777 bp and the end is at 23,761,407 bp, which is a span of 39,631 base pairs.

ACOT9 location on the human chromosome X

=== Aliases ===
ACOT9 gene is known primarily for encoding the Acyl-CoA thioesterase 9 protein. Other, less commonly used names for the gene are ACATE2, and MT-ACT48.

== Function ==
The protein encoded by the ACOT9 gene is part of a family of Acyl-CoA thioesterases, which catalyze the hydrolysis of various Coenzyme A esters of various molecules to the free acid plus CoA. These enzymes have also been referred to in the literature as acyl-CoA hydrolases, acyl-CoA thioester hydrolases, and palmitoyl-CoA hydrolases. The reaction carried out by these enzymes is as follows:

CoA ester + H_{2}O → free acid + coenzyme A

These enzymes use the same substrates as long-chain acyl-CoA synthetases, but have a unique purpose in that they generate the free acid and CoA, as opposed to long-chain acyl-CoA synthetases, which ligate fatty acids to CoA, to produce the CoA ester. The role of the ACOT- family of enzymes is not well understood; however, it has been suggested that they play a crucial role in regulating the intracellular levels of CoA esters, Coenzyme A, and free fatty acids. Recent studies have shown that Acyl-CoA esters have many more functions than simply an energy source. These functions include allosteric regulation of enzymes such as acetyl-CoA carboxylase, hexokinase IV, and the citrate condensing enzyme. Long-chain acyl-CoAs also regulate opening of ATP-sensitive potassium channels and activation of Calcium ATPases, thereby regulating insulin secretion. A number of other cellular events are also mediated via acyl-CoAs, for example signal transduction through protein kinase C, inhibition of retinoic acid-induced apoptosis, and involvement in budding and fusion of the endomembrane system. Acyl-CoAs also mediate protein targeting to various membranes and regulation of G Protein α subunits, because they are substrates for protein acylation. In the mitochondria, acyl-CoA esters are involved in the acylation of mitochondrial NAD+ dependent dehydrogenases; because these enzymes are responsible for amino acid catabolism, this acylation renders the whole process inactive. This mechanism may provide metabolic crosstalk and act to regulate the NADH/NAD+ ratio in order to maintain optimal mitochondrial beta oxidation of fatty acids. The role of CoA esters in lipid metabolism and numerous other intracellular processes are well defined, and thus it is hypothesized that ACOT- enzymes play a role in modulating the processes these metabolites are involved in.

== Homology/Evolution ==
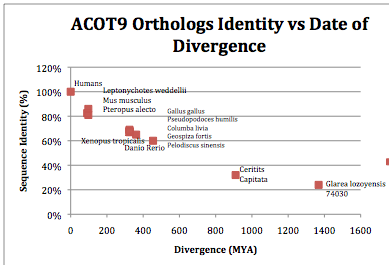
Divergence of Sequence Identity (%) vs. Time (MYA) in ACOT9

=== Orthologs ===
There are many orthologs of ACOT9, the house mouse (Mus musculus) being one of the most similar, where the ACOT9 gene is found at 72.38cM on chromosome X. The range of orthologs extends to mammals, birds, amphibians, anamorphic fungi, and others.

Sequence number	Genus and species	Common name	Date of divergence (MYA)	Accession number	Sequence length	Sequence identity	Sequence similarity	Notes
1	Homo sapiens	Human	0	NP_001028755.2	439	100%	100%	Human
2	Mus musculus	House mouse	91	NP_062710.2	439	83%	90%	Rodent
3	Pteropus alecto	Black flying fox	97.4	XP_006911668.1	480	81%	91%	Bat
4	Gallus gallus	Chicken	324.5	NP_001012841.1	425	69%	87%	Bird
5	Pseudopodoces humilis	Ground tit	324.5	XP_005516751.1	417	68%	85%	Bird
6	Columba livia	Rock dove	324.5	XP_005503782.1	402	67%	86%	Bird
7	Geospiza fortis	Medium ground finch	324.5	XP_005424946.1	417	67%	85%	Bird
8	Pelodiscus sinensis	Chinese soft shelled turtle	324.5	XP_006112565.1	439	67%	85%	Reptile
9	Xenopus tropicalis	Western clawed frog	361.2	AAI61600.1	418	65%	82%	Amphibian
10	Danio rerio	Zebrafish	454.6	AAI59216.1	434	60%	80%	Fish
11	Ceratitis capitata	Mediterranean fruit fly	910	JAB97119.1	433	32%	58%	Insect
12	Glarea lozoyensis 74030	Anamorphic fungus	1368	EHL00310.1	350	24%	47%	Fungus

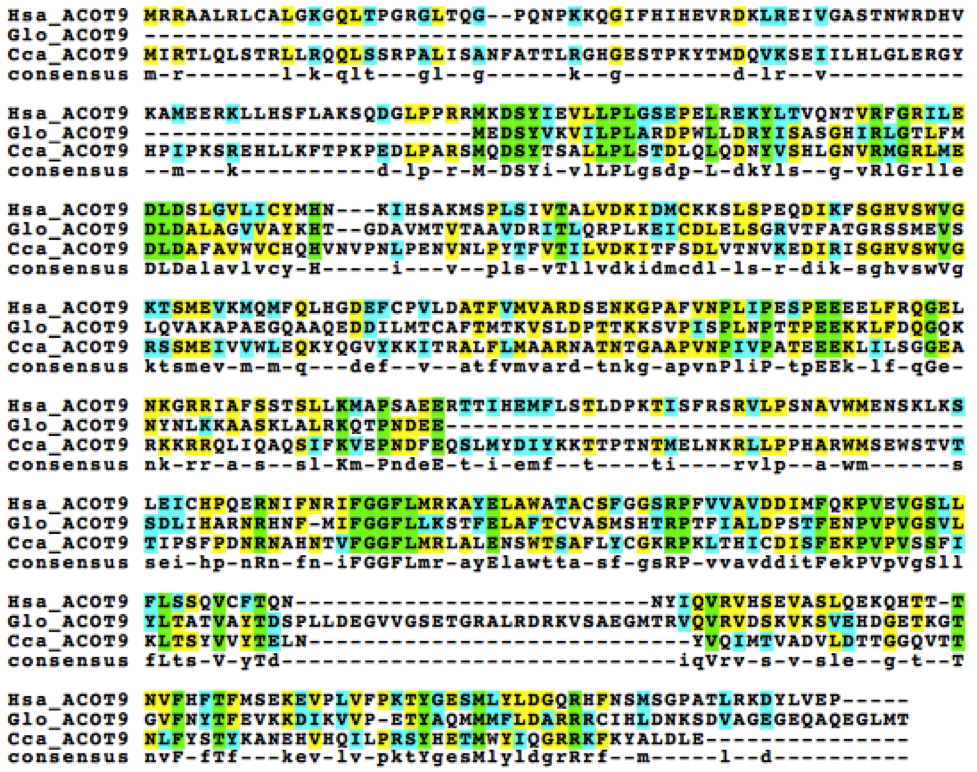
Conservation of ACOT9 gene between H. sapiens, G. lozoyensis, and C. capitata

=== Paralogs ===
In mice, which is one of the closest orthologs, ACOT10 is a known paralog of the ACOT9 gene.

== Expression ==
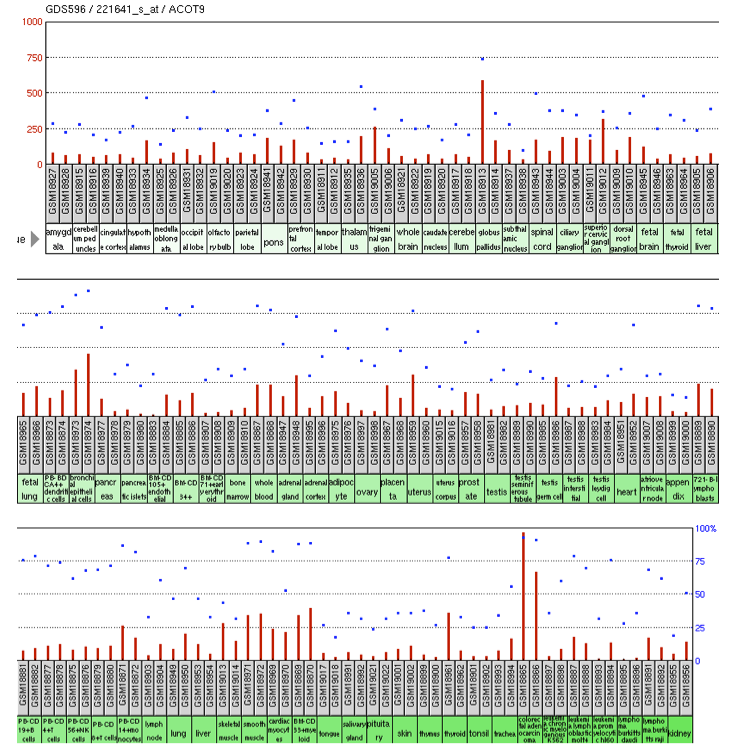
ACOT9 expression chart

Expression of the ACOT9 is ubiquitous throughout the tissues in humans. Tissues with a value of over 500 in the large-scale analysis of the human transcriptome were the globus pallidus and colorectal adenocarcinoma. The expressed sequence tag (or EST) abundance profile also shows ubiquitous/near ubiquitous, expression throughout human tissues.

== Transcription factors ==
There are numerous transcription factors throughout the ACOT9 promoter sequence. Some of the notable factors are heat shock factors and transcription factor II B (TFIIB) recognition elements.

Transcription factor	Start	End	Strand	Sequence
X gene core promoter element 1	683	693	-	ggGCGGgaccg
Doublesex and mab-3 related transcription factor 1	81	101	+	tttttttgagacaTTGTctcc
cAMP-responsive element binding protein 1	491	511	-	agggcgTGACgtcgagaagag
Sp4 transcription factor	660	676	-	ccagggGGCGtggccgc
Stimulating protein 1, ubiquitous zinc finger transcription factor	682	698	-	tccggGGGCgggaccgc
Heat shock factor 1	24	48	+	caggactaaactAGAAtctccagcc
E2F transcription factor 2	808	824	+	ccatcGCGCgcacggca
Nuclear factor of activated T-cells 5	380	398	+	tttGGAAagttgcccagga
ZF5 POZ domain zinc finger, zinc finger protein 161 (secondary DNA binding preference)	811	825	+	tcgCGCGcacggcag
B-cell-specific activator protein	678	706	-	cagcggtgtccgggGGCGggaccgcggcg
Pax-6 paired domain binding site	54	72	+	gtctcAAGCatcagttttt
ZF5 POZ domain zinc finger, zinc finger protein 161 (secondary DNA binding preference)	651	665	-	ggcCGCGctgtgccg
Pax-6 paired domain binding site	758	776	+	ttttaTCGCctcagtttcc
Mammalian C-type LTR TATA box	751	767	-	ggcgaTAAAagacgcac
Nuclear factor Y (Y-box binding factor)	624	638	+	cccgCCAAtgaacgg
Transcription factor II B (TFIIB) recognition element	356	362	+	ccgCGCC
Transcription factor II B (TFIIB) recognition element	440	446	-	ccgCGCC
Transcription factor II B (TFIIB) recognition element	734	740	-	ccgCGCC
Nuclear factor Y (Y-box binding factor)	581	595	-	ccacTCAAtcagttg
CCAAT/enhancer binding protein alpha	529	543	-	tcggttgaGTAAacg

== Secondary structure ==
There are two regions in the ACOT9 gene sequence that are labeled as BFIT (Brown Fat Inducible Thioesterase) and BACH (Brain Acyl CoA Hydrolase) regions. These regions are part of a HotDog fold superfamily, which has been found to be used in a variety of cell roles. Predictions show there to be various alpha-helices throughout the structure, suggesting it is a transmembrane protein.

== Interactions ==
A mitochondrial cleavage site can be found at amino acid 30 in the ACOT9 sequence, and the probability of export to the mitochondria is 0.9374. The Acyl-CoA thioesterase 9 protein is estimated to be 60.9% mitochondrial, 21.7% cytoplasmic, 8.7% nuclear, 4.3% in the plasma membrane, and 4.3% in the endoplasmic reticulum.

The ACOT9 protein has been found to interact with the following proteins either experimentally or through co-expression:

- C1orf151
- MCTS1
- C1GALT1C1
- FBXW12
- RLIM
- RPS6KA3
- RAB9A
- UBC
- CXorf26
- HCCS
