= ACOT2 =

Protein-coding gene in the species Homo sapiens

Identifiers
- Aliases: ACOT2, CTE-IA, CTE1A, MTE1, PTE2, PTE2A, ZAP128, acyl-CoA thioesterase 2
- External IDs: OMIM: 609972; MGI: 2159605; GeneCards: ACOT2
Available structures
PDB	Ortholog search: PDBe RCSB
PDB	List of PDB id codes 3HLK
Enzyme activity
EC #	BRENDA	ExPASy	KEGG	MetaCyc
3.1.2.2	↗	↗	↗	↗

Gene location (Human)
Chr.	Chromosome 14 (human)
Band	14q24.3	Start	73,567,620 bp
Band	14q24.3	End	73,575,658 bp

Gene location (Mouse)
Chr.	Chromosome 12 (mouse)
Band	12|12 D1	Start	84,034,635 bp
Band	12|12 D1	End	84,040,647 bp
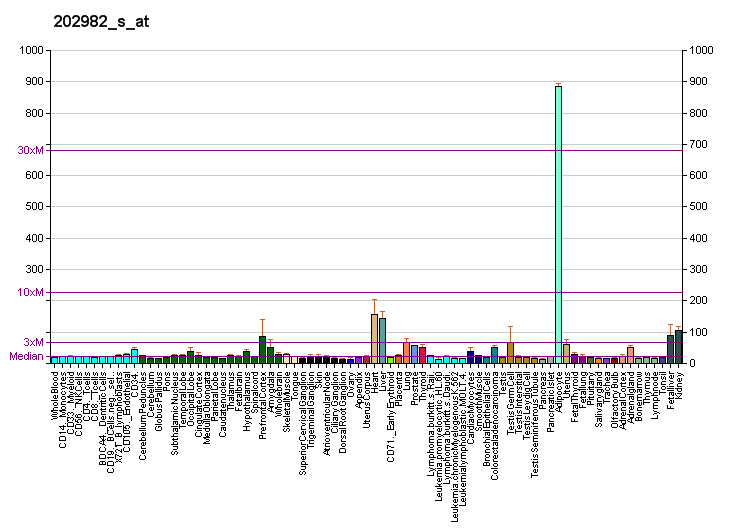
RNA expression pattern
Bgee	Human / Mouse (ortholog); Top expressed in: apex of heart; liver; left ventricle; right lobe of liver; muscle of thigh; skeletal muscle tissue; gastrocnemius muscle; right auricle of heart; right adrenal gland; right adrenal cortex / Top expressed in: interventricular septum; aortic valve; myocardium of ventricle; ascending aorta; muscle of thigh; brown adipose tissue; cumulus cell; ciliary body; decidua; internal carotid artery; More reference expression data
BioGPS	More reference expression data
Gene ontology
Molecular function	thiolester hydrolase activity; palmitoyl-CoA hydrolase activity; carboxylic ester hydrolase activity; hydrolase activity; signaling receptor binding; acyl-CoA hydrolase activity; myristoyl-CoA hydrolase activity; protein binding
Cellular component	mitochondrial matrix; mitochondrion; peroxisomal matrix; cytosol
Biological process	very long-chain fatty acid metabolic process; long-chain fatty acid metabolic process; acyl-CoA metabolic process; protein targeting to peroxisome; fatty acid metabolic process; lipid metabolism
Sources:Amigo / QuickGO
Orthologs
Databases	NCBI: entry; OMA: entry
Species	Human	Mouse
Entrez	10965	171210
Ensembl	ENSG00000119673	ENSMUSG00000021226
UniProt	P49753	Q9QYR9
RefSeq (mRNA)	NM_006821; NM_001364177; NM_001364178	NM_134188
RefSeq (protein)	NP_006812; NP_001351106; NP_001351107	NP_598949
Location (UCSC)	Chr 14: 73.57 – 73.58 Mb	Chr 12: 84.03 – 84.04 Mb
PubMed search
- Wikidata
View/Edit Human	View/Edit Mouse

Acyl-CoA thioesterase 2, also known as ACOT2, is an enzyme which in humans is encoded by the ACOT2 gene.

Acyl-CoA thioesterases, such as ACOT2, are a group of enzymes that hydrolyze Coenzyme A (CoA) esters, such as acyl-CoAs, bile CoAs, and CoA esters of prostaglandins, to the corresponding free acid and CoA. ACOT2 shows high acyl-CoA thioesterase activity on medium- and long-chain acyl-CoAs, with an optimal pH of 8.5. It is most active on myristoyl-CoA but also shows high activity on palmitoyl-CoA, stearoyl-CoA, and arachidoyl-CoA.

== Function ==
The protein encoded by the ACOT2 gene is part of a family of Acyl-CoA thioesterases, which catalyze the hydrolysis of various Coenzyme A esters of various molecules to the free acid plus CoA. These enzymes have also been referred to in the literature as acyl-CoA hydrolases, acyl-CoA thioester hydrolases, and palmitoyl-CoA hydrolases. The reaction carried out by these enzymes is as follows:

CoA ester + H_{2}O → free acid + coenzyme A

These enzymes use the same substrates as long-chain acyl-CoA synthetases, but have a unique purpose in that they generate the free acid and CoA, as opposed to long-chain acyl-CoA synthetases, which ligate fatty acids to CoA, to produce the CoA ester. The role of the ACOT- family of enzymes is not well understood; however, it has been suggested that they play a crucial role in regulating the intracellular levels of CoA esters, Coenzyme A, and free fatty acids. Recent studies have shown that Acyl-CoA esters have many more functions than simply an energy source. These functions include allosteric regulation of enzymes such as acetyl-CoA carboxylase, hexokinase IV, and the citrate condensing enzyme. Long-chain acyl-CoAs also regulate opening of ATP-sensitive potassium channels and activation of Calcium ATPases, thereby regulating insulin secretion. A number of other cellular events are also mediated via acyl-CoAs, for example signal transduction through protein kinase C, inhibition of retinoic acid-induced apoptosis, and involvement in budding and fusion of the endomembrane system. Acyl-CoAs also mediate protein targeting to various membranes and regulation of G Protein α subunits, because they are substrates for protein acylation. In the mitochondria, acyl-CoA esters are involved in the acylation of mitochondrial NAD+ dependent dehydrogenases; because these enzymes are responsible for amino acid catabolism, this acylation renders the whole process inactive. This mechanism may provide metabolic crosstalk and act to regulate the NADH/NAD+ ratio in order to maintain optimal mitochondrial beta oxidation of fatty acids. The role of CoA esters in lipid metabolism and numerous other intracellular processes are well defined, and thus it is hypothesized that ACOT- enzymes play a role in modulating the processes these metabolites are involved in.
