= FAM151A =

Protein found in humans

Identifiers
- Aliases: FAM151A, C1orf179, family with sequence similarity 151 member A
- External IDs: MGI: 2657115; GeneCards: FAM151A

Gene location (Human)
Chr.	Chromosome 1 (human)
Band	n/a	Start	54,609,181 bp
Band	n/a	End	54,623,556 bp

Gene location (Mouse)
Chr.	Chromosome 4 (mouse)
Band	4|4 C7	Start	106,591,086 bp
Band	4|4 C7	End	106,605,489 bp
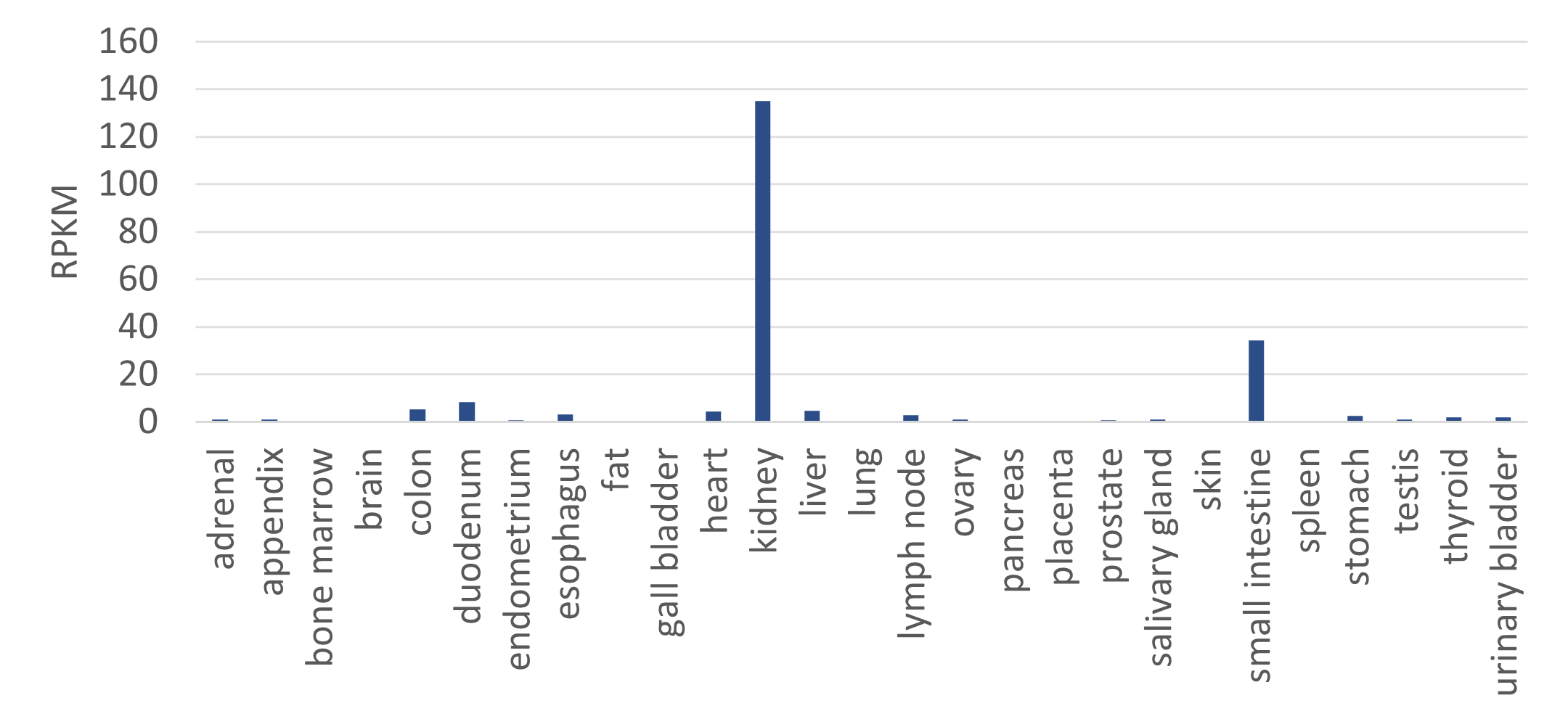
RNA expression pattern
Bgee	Human / Mouse (ortholog); Top expressed in: right lobe of liver; renal cortex; human kidney; testicle; mucosa of transverse colon; apex of heart; left ventricle; gonad; lymph node; rectum / Top expressed in: right kidney; islet of Langerhans; primary oocyte; human kidney; proximal tubule; morula; morula; blastocyst; secondary oocyte; intestinal villus; More reference expression data
BioGPS	More reference expression data
Gene ontology
Molecular function	molecular function
Cellular component	membrane; integral component of membrane; extracellular exosome
Biological process	biological process
Sources:Amigo / QuickGO
Orthologs
Databases	NCBI: entry; OMA: entry
Species	Human	Mouse
Entrez	338094	230579
Ensembl	ENSG00000162391	ENSMUSG00000034871
UniProt	Q8WW52	Q8QZW3
RefSeq (mRNA)	NM_176782	NM_146149
RefSeq (protein)	NP_788954	NP_666261
Location (UCSC)	Chr 1: 54.61 – 54.62 Mb	Chr 4: 106.59 – 106.61 Mb
PubMed search
- Wikidata
View/Edit Human	View/Edit Mouse

Family with sequence similarity 151 member A (abbreviated FAM151A) is a protein that in humans is encoded by the FAM151A gene. The protein is a transmembrane protein expressed in the kidney tubules, and is an ortholog of menorin, a protein involved in neuron development in nematodes.

== Gene ==
Genomic region of 3' UTR of gene FAM151A

The FAM151A gene contains 8 exons and is located on the minus strand of chromosome 1 at 1p32.3, spanning approximately 14 kbp. The last exon contains approximately half of the coding sequence, and overlaps with the 3' UTR of gene ACOT11. No alternative splicings of FAM151A are known.

== Expression ==
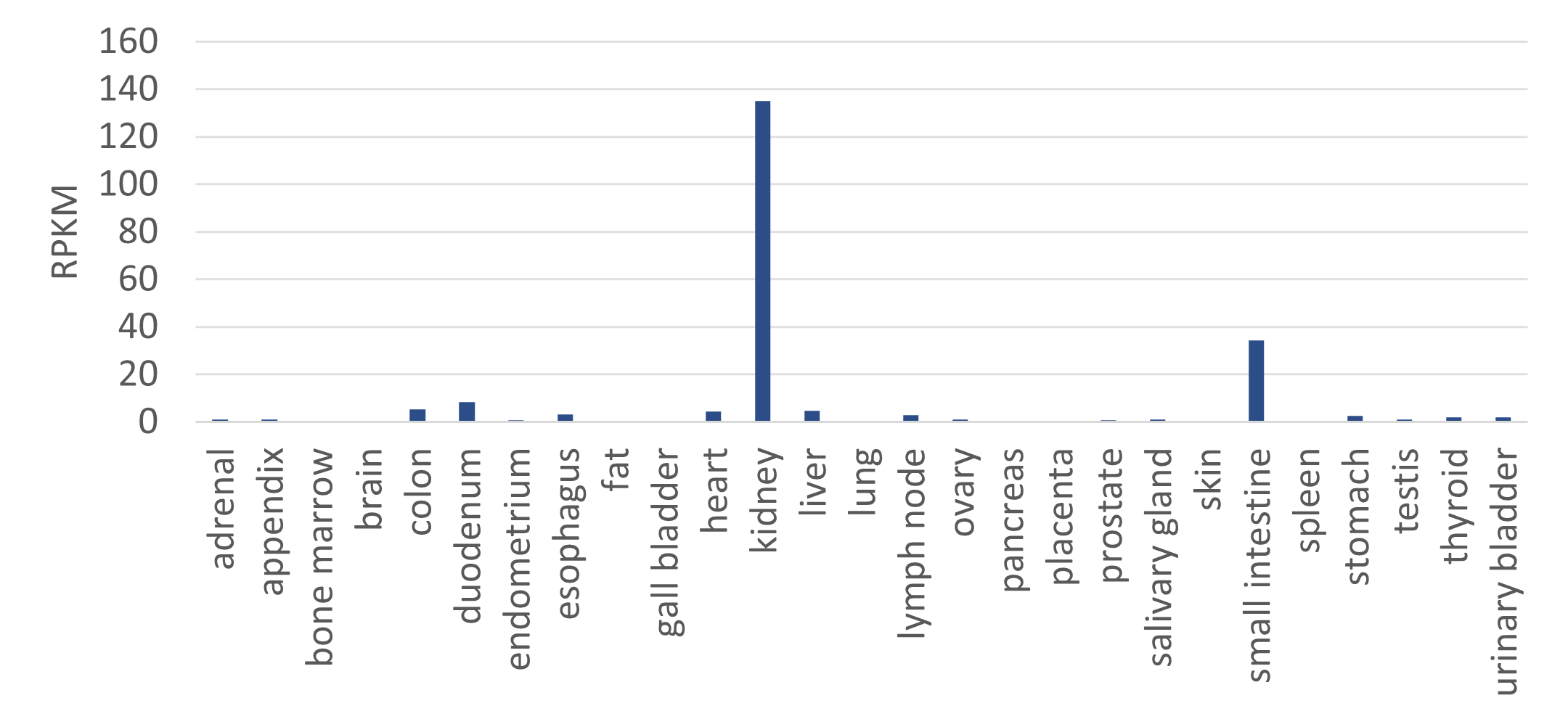
FAM151A Expression in HPA RNA-seq normal tissues

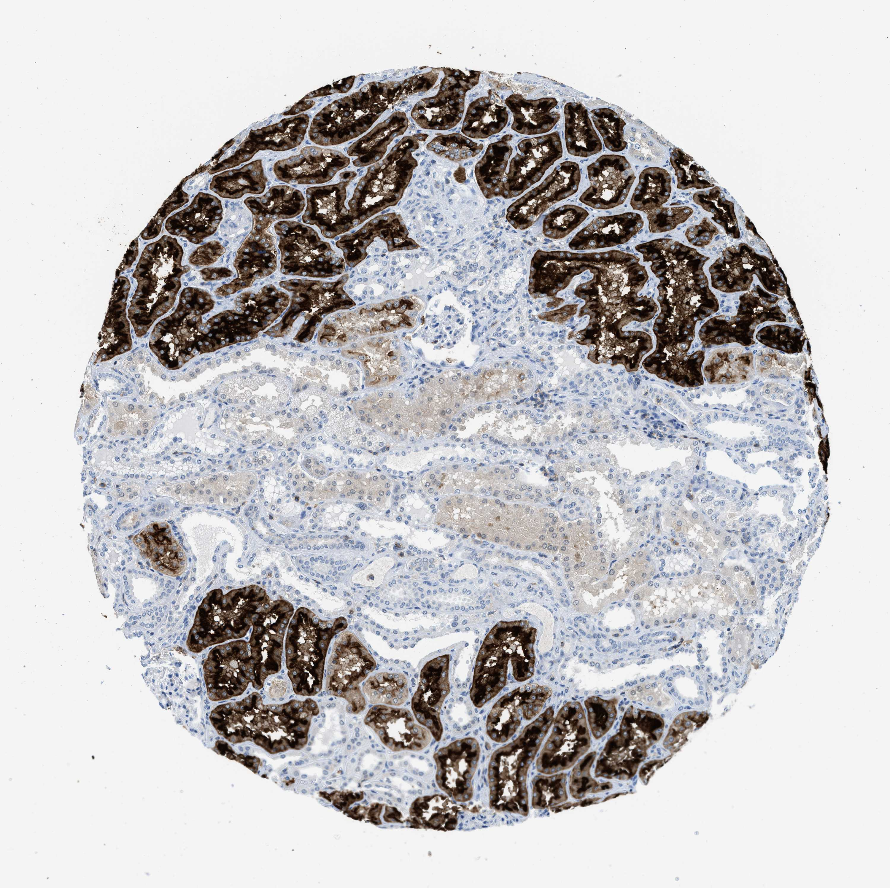
Antibody staining of FAM151A in human kidney tissue

The mRNA transcript of FAM151A is expressed in the kidney, small intestine, and liver, while the FAM151A protein is only expressed in kidney tubules.

== Protein ==
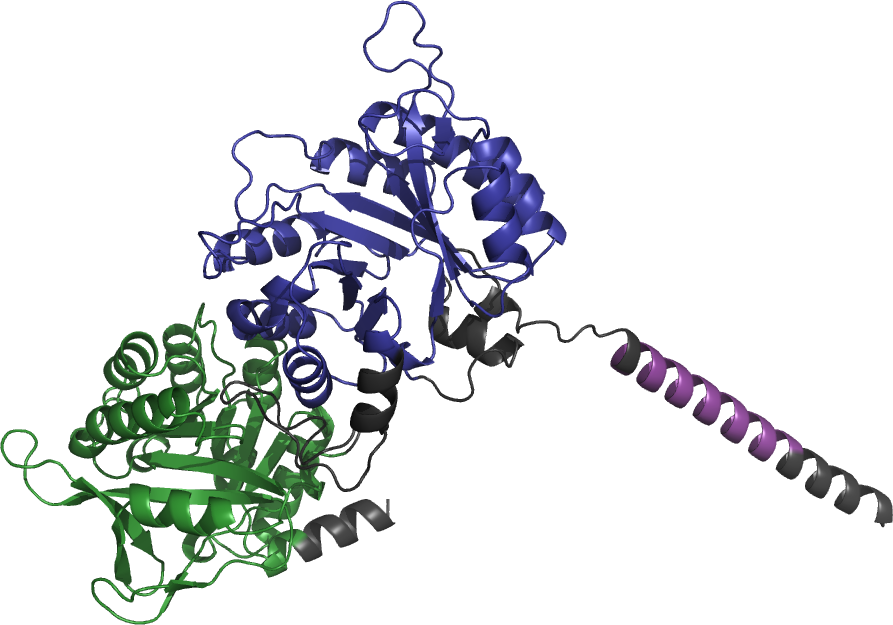
FAM151A tertiary structure as predicted by AlphaFold2

The FAM151A protein contains three known domains, one transmembrane domain and two domains of unknown function DUF2181. DUF2181 is a member of the GDPD/PLCD superfamily, which are known to hydrolyze glycerophosphodiester bonds. The second DUF2181 of FAM151A is hypothesized to be nonfunctional through homology analysis. The molecular weight of FAM151A is known to be approximately 95 kDa.

== Evolutionary history ==
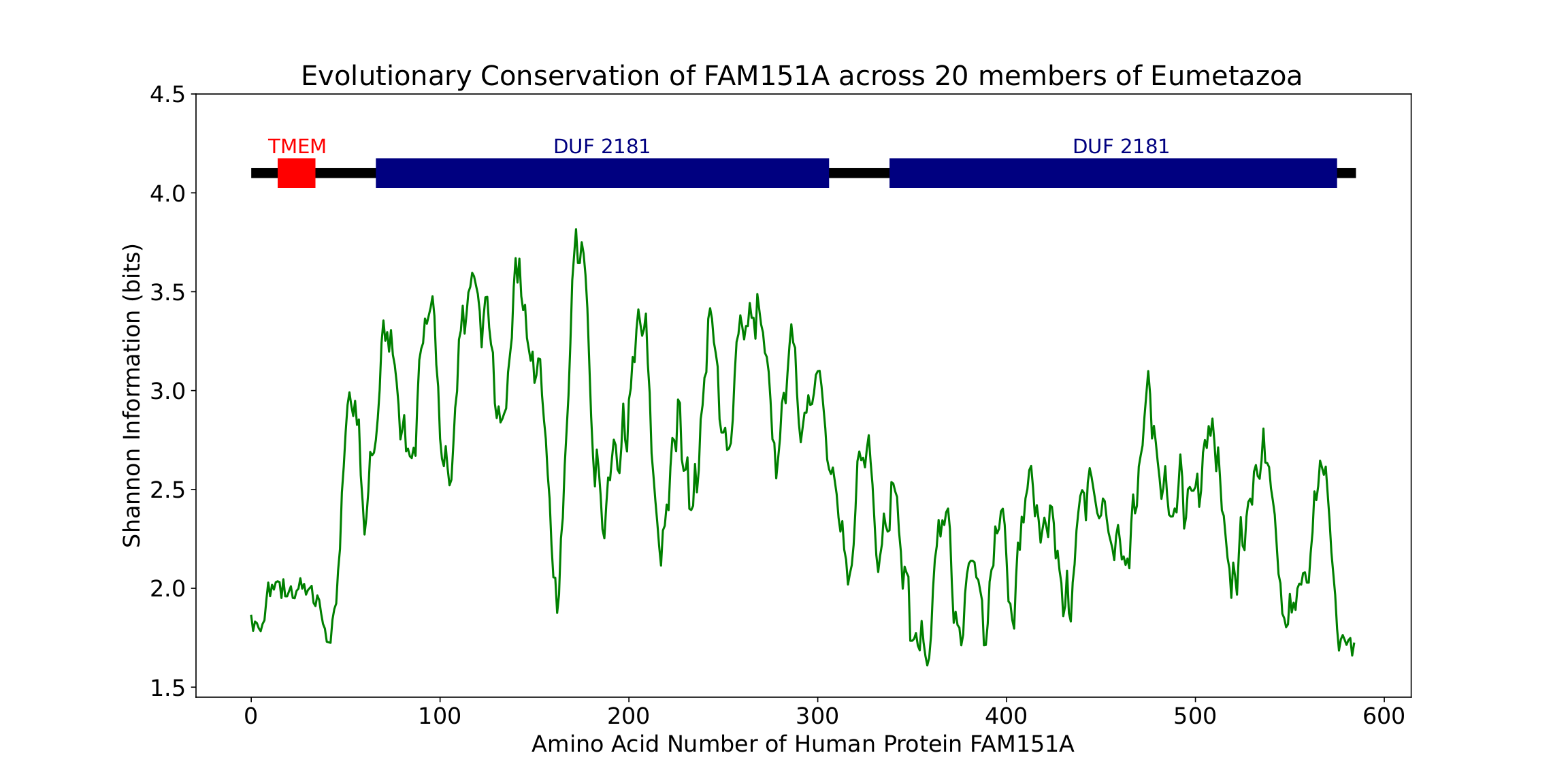
Shannon information content of amino acid residues for 20 aligned FAM151A sequences

=== Orthologs of FAM151A ===
FAM151A has direct orthologs in chimpanzee, mouse, zebrafish, and other members of the clade Eumetazoa that diverged from humans up to around 700 million years ago. However, FAM151A does not have any known orthologs in birds.

=== Protein family fam151/menorin ===
FAM151A has one known paralog in humans, FAM151B, which contains only the first DUF2181 and no transmembrane region. In mammals, both FAM151A and FAM151B are homologs of the C. elegans menorin gene, involved in dendrite branching.

== Clinical significance ==
FAM151A contains an SNP, rs11206394, that is a significant predictor of colorectal cancer. The SNP is a missense mutation that occurs in the region of the second DUF2181 of FAM151A that overlaps with the 3' UTR of ACOT11. Individuals with both copies of the minor allele have been observed to have the odds of cancer decreased between 11% and 59%.
