= ACOT11 =

Protein-coding gene in humans

Identifiers
- Aliases: ACOT11, BFIT, STARD14, THEA, THEM1, acyl-CoA thioesterase 11
- External IDs: OMIM: 606803; MGI: 1913736; GeneCards: ACOT11
Available structures
PDB	Ortholog search: PDBe RCSB
PDB	List of PDB id codes 3FO5
Enzyme activity
EC #	BRENDA	ExPASy	KEGG	MetaCyc
3.1.2.2	↗	↗	↗	↗

Gene location (Human)
Chr.	Chromosome 1 (human)
Band	1p32.3	Start	54,542,257 bp
Band	1p32.3	End	54,639,192 bp

Gene location (Mouse)
Chr.	Chromosome 4 (mouse)
Band	4|4 C7	Start	106,601,752 bp
Band	4|4 C7	End	106,662,195 bp
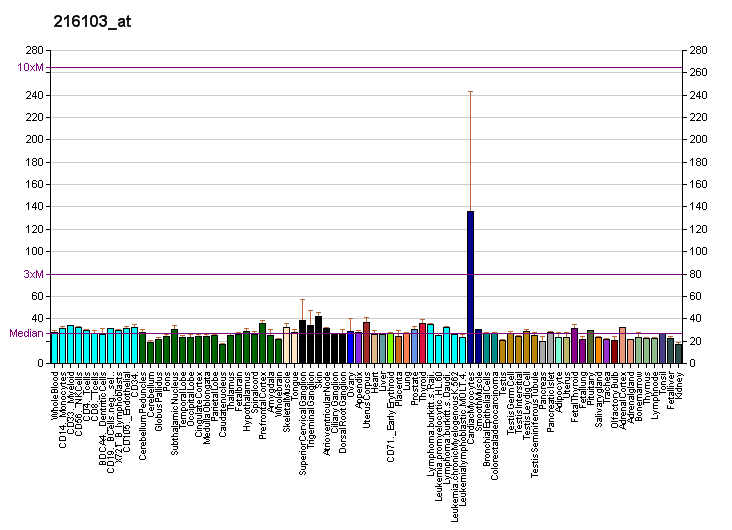

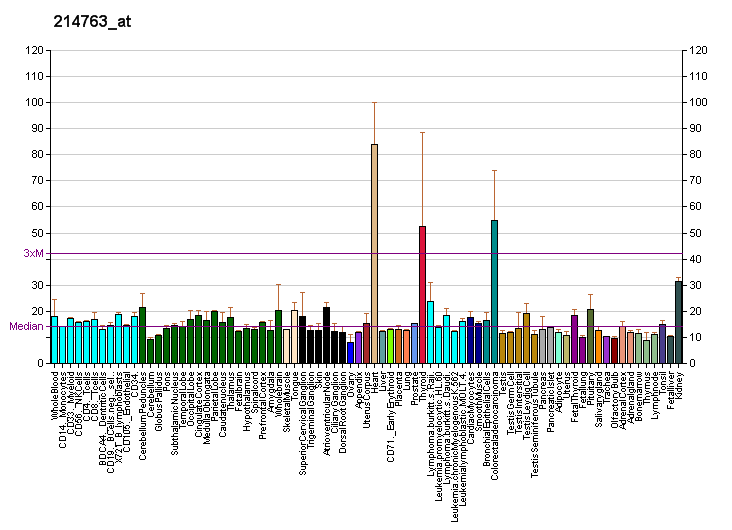
RNA expression pattern
Bgee	Human / Mouse (ortholog); Top expressed in: apex of heart; mucosa of transverse colon; buccal mucosa cell; duodenum; jejunal mucosa; left ventricle; mucosa of ileum; renal medulla; mucosa of pharynx; human kidney / Top expressed in: gastrula; deep cerebellar nuclei; median eminence; medial vestibular nucleus; retinal pigment epithelium; inferior colliculi; Epithelium of choroid plexus; dorsal tegmental nucleus; superior colliculus; pontine nuclei; More reference expression data
BioGPS	More reference expression data
Gene ontology
Molecular function	hydrolase activity; lipid binding; acyl-CoA hydrolase activity; carboxylic ester hydrolase activity; fatty-acyl-CoA binding; palmitoyl-CoA hydrolase activity; thiolester hydrolase activity; long-chain fatty acyl-CoA binding; myristoyl-CoA hydrolase activity
Cellular component	extracellular exosome; cytoplasm; cytosol; mitochondrion; mitochondrial matrix
Biological process	intracellular signal transduction; response to temperature stimulus; response to cold; fatty acid metabolic process; acyl-CoA metabolic process; negative regulation of cold-induced thermogenesis; palmitic acid biosynthetic process; lipid metabolism
Sources:Amigo / QuickGO
Orthologs
Databases	NCBI: entry; OMA: entry
Species	Human	Mouse
Entrez	26027	329910
Ensembl	ENSG00000162390	ENSMUSG00000034853
UniProt	Q8WXI4	Q8VHQ9
RefSeq (mRNA)	NM_147161; NM_015547	NM_025590; NM_001347159
RefSeq (protein)	NP_056362; NP_671517	NP_001334088; NP_079866
Location (UCSC)	Chr 1: 54.54 – 54.64 Mb	Chr 4: 106.6 – 106.66 Mb
PubMed search
- Wikidata
View/Edit Human	View/Edit Mouse

Acyl-coenzyme A thioesterase 11 also known as StAR-related lipid transfer protein 14 (STARD14) is an enzyme that in humans is encoded by the ACOT11 gene. This gene encodes a protein with acyl-CoA thioesterase activity towards medium (C12) and long-chain (C18) fatty acyl-CoA substrates which relies on its StAR-related lipid transfer domain. Expression of a similar murine protein in brown adipose tissue is induced by cold exposure and repressed by warmth. Expression of the mouse protein has been associated with obesity, with higher expression found in obesity-resistant mice compared with obesity-prone mice. Alternative splicing results in two transcript variants encoding different isoforms.

== Structure ==
The ACOT11 gene is located on the 1st chromosome, with its specific localization being 1p32.3. It contains 18 exons.

The protein encoded by this gene contains 258 amino acids, and forms a homodimer with another chain. Its theoretical weight is 26.67 kDa. The protein contains a StAR-related transfer domain, which is a domain responsible for binding to lipids. There are 4 known ligands that bind to this homodimer: polyethylene glycol, chlorine, glycerol, and a form of TCEP.

== Function ==
The protein encoded by the ACOT11 gene is part of a family of Acyl-CoA thioesterases, which catalyze the hydrolysis of various coenzyme A esters of various molecules to the free acid plus CoA. These enzymes have also been referred to in the literature as acyl-CoA hydrolases, acyl-CoA thioester hydrolases, and palmitoyl-CoA hydrolases. The reaction carried out by these enzymes is as follows:

CoA ester + H_{2}O → free acid + coenzyme A

These enzymes use the same substrates as long-chain acyl-CoA synthetases, but have a unique purpose in that they generate the free acid and CoA, as opposed to long-chain acyl-CoA synthetases, which ligate fatty acids to CoA, to produce the CoA ester. The role of the ACOT- family of enzymes is not well understood; however, it has been suggested that they play a crucial role in regulating the intracellular levels of CoA esters, Coenzyme A, and free fatty acids. Recent studies have shown that Acyl-CoA esters have many more functions than simply an energy source. These functions include allosteric regulation of enzymes such as acetyl-CoA carboxylase, hexokinase IV, and the citrate condensing enzyme. Long-chain acyl-CoAs also regulate opening of ATP-sensitive potassium channels and activation of calcium ATPases, thereby regulating insulin secretion. A number of other cellular events are also mediated via acyl-CoAs, for example signal transduction through protein kinase C, inhibition of retinoic acid–induced apoptosis, and involvement in budding and fusion of the endomembrane system. Acyl-CoAs also mediate protein targeting to various membranes and regulation of G protein α subunits, because they are substrates for protein acylation. In the mitochondria, acyl-CoA esters are involved in the acylation of mitochondrial NAD+ dependent dehydrogenases; because these enzymes are responsible for amino acid catabolism, this acylation renders the whole process inactive. This mechanism may provide metabolic crosstalk and act to regulate the NADH/NAD+ ratio in order to maintain optimal mitochondrial beta oxidation of fatty acids. The role of CoA esters in lipid metabolism and numerous other intracellular processes are well defined, and thus it is hypothesized that ACOT- enzymes play a role in modulating the processes these metabolites are involved in.
