= Disorazol =

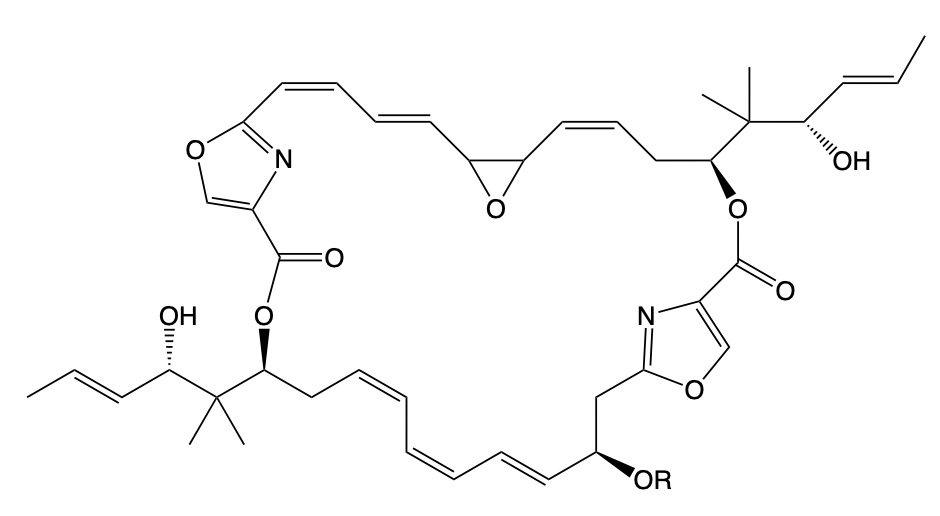

Names
- IUPAC name (2Z,4E,9Z,23Z,25Z)-12,28-bis[(E)-3-hydroxy-2-methylhex-4-en-2-yl]-20-methoxy-7,13,17,29,33-pentaoxa-34,35-diazatetracyclo[29.2.1.1^{15,18}.0^{6,8}]pentatriaconta-1(34),2,4,9,15,18(35),21,23,25,31-decaene-14,30-dione
- Other names Disorazole; Disorazol A

Identifiers
| CAS Number | A: 158181-47-6 |
| 3D model (JSmol) | A: Interactive image |
| ChemSpider | A: 8163256 |
| PubChem CID | A: 139586756 |
- InChI: InChI=1S/C43H54N2O10/c1-8-18-34(46)42(3,4)36-23-14-12-10-11-13-20-29(50-7)26-39-45-31(28-52-39)41(49)55-37(43(5,6)35(47)19-9-2)24-17-22-33-32(53-33)21-15-16-25-38-44-30(27-51-38)40(48)54-36/h8-22,25,27-29,32-37,46-47H,23-24,26H2,1-7H3/b11-10-,14-12-,18-8+,19-9+,20-13?,21-15+,22-17-,25-16- Key: FRFRWOXVYJSPCG-KUALNVSNSA-N
- SMILES: A: C/C=C/C(C(C)(C)C1C/C=C\C=C/C=CC(CC2=NC(=CO2)C(=O)OC(C/C=C\C3C(O3)/C=C/C=C\C4=NC(=CO4)C(=O)O1)C(C)(C)C(/C=C/C)O)OC)O

Properties
| Chemical formula | C_{43}H_{54}N_{2}O_{10} |
| Molar mass | 758.909 g·mol^{−1} |
- Except where otherwise noted, data are given for materials in their standard state (at 25 °C [77 °F], 100 kPa). Infobox references

Disorazol, a cyclic polyketide synthesized by the bacterium Sorangium cellulosum So ce12, was first detected and isolated in 1994. Its chemical structure consists of a macrocyclic ring and two oxazole rings. Disorazol A has been demonstrated to exhibit anti-fungi activities, but it was not active against yeasts. In addition, this substance demonstrates potent anti-cancer characteristics at exceptionally low picomolar levels by obstructing the mechanism of tubulin assembly and triggering the disruption of microtubules. As a result, these impacts lead to the initiation of cell apoptosis. However, disorazols cannot be directly used as drugs in the clinic due to its extremely high cytotoxicity and instability. Thus, chemical and biosynthetic synthesis pathways were designed to synthesize unnatural derivatives of disorazol in hope of reducing its cytotoxicity without decreasing its anti-cancer potency.

== Biosynthesis ==
Four synthetic genes, disABCD, have been identified and documented as contributors to the biosynthesis of disorazol. The disABC genes encode hybrid trans-AT type polyketide synthase (PKS) megaenzymes, while the disD gene encodes an additional acyl transferase protein and an enoylreductase (ER). Notably, the ER encoded in the disD gene was not involved in the biosynthesis pathway of disorazol.

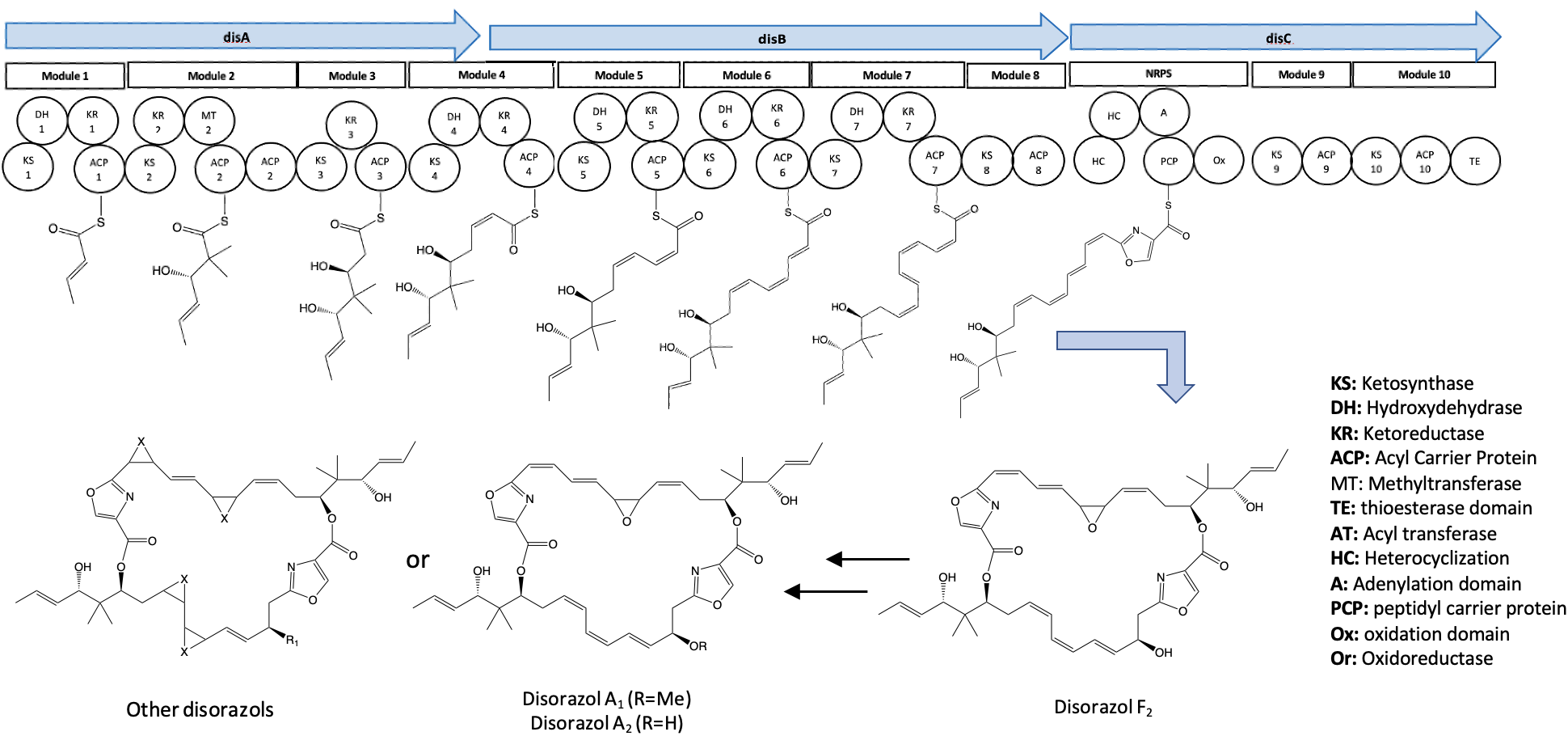
The biosynthesis pathway of Disorazol. 10 modules and disABC biosynthetic genes are involved in this biosynthesis pathway.

Generally, 10 synthetic modules were involved in the biosynthesis pathway of disorazol. The formation of half of the disorazol bis-lactone core involves the utilization of seven malonyl-CoA molecules and one serine molecule as extender units. Subsequently, the dimerization or cyclization of two polyketide monomers takes place within the thioesterase (TE) domain located in module 10, leading to the synthesis of disorazol. Furthermore, the release of the final product is facilitated by module 8, 9, and 10. The process of PKS monomer dimerization in the biosynthesis pathway of disorazol exhibits an unconventional nature.
