= Acetyl-CoA hydrolase =

Class of enzymes

acetyl-CoA hydrolase

Identifiers
- EC no.: 3.1.2.1
- CAS no.: 9027-54-7

Databases
- IntEnz: IntEnz view
- BRENDA: BRENDA entry
- ExPASy: NiceZyme view
- KEGG: KEGG entry
- MetaCyc: metabolic pathway
- PRIAM: profile
- PDB structures: RCSB PDB PDBe PDBsum
- Gene Ontology: AmiGO / QuickGO
Search
- PMC: articles
- PubMed: articles
- NCBI: proteins

The enzyme acetyl-CoA hydrolase (EC 3.1.2.1) catalyzes the reaction

acetyl-CoA + H_{2}O $\rightleftharpoons$ CoA + acetate

This enzyme belongs to the family of hydrolases, specifically those acting on thioester bonds. The systematic name is CoA thiol esterase. This enzyme participates in pyruvate metabolism.

== Structural studies ==
As of late 2007, only one structure has been solved for this class of enzymes, with the PDB accession code 2H4U.

== See also ==
- Acetyl-CoA synthetase and ACSS2, enzymes that perform the reverse reaction using ATP
