= Glycerophosphoinositol inositolphosphodiesterase =

Class of enzymes

glycerophosphoinositol inositolphosphodiesterase

Identifiers
- EC no.: 3.1.4.43
- CAS no.: 9076-91-9

Databases
- BRENDA: enzyme data
- ExPASy: NiceZyme view
- KEGG: enzyme entry
- MetaCyc: metabolic pathway
- Rhea: reactions
- PDB structures: RCSB PDB PDBe PDBsum
- Gene Ontology: AmiGO / QuickGO
Search
- PMC: articles
- PubMed: articles
- NCBI: proteins

The enzyme glycerophosphoinositol inositolphosphodiesterase (EC 3.1.4.43) is an enzyme that catalyzes the chemical reaction

1-(sn-glycero-3-phospho)-1D-myo-inositol
H_{2}O
glycerol
+
inositol monophosphate

The enzyme characterised from rat kidney hydrolyses 1-(sn-glycero-3-phospho)-1D-myo-inositol to its components glycerol and inositol monophosphate.

The compound 1D-myo-inositol 1,2-cyclic phosphate is also a substrate for the enzyme and is converted to the same product as the linear phosphate diester. The protein making up the enzyme is also called lipocortin III or annexin III:

1D-myo-inositol 1,2-cyclic phosphate
H_{2}O
inositol monophosphate

However, a later X-ray crystallography study demonstrated that annexin III did not possess any enzymatic activity.

== Nomenclature ==
This enzyme is a hydrolase, specifically one acting on phosphoric diester bonds. The systematic name is 1-(sn-glycero-3-phospho)-1D-myo-inositol inositolphosphohydrolase. Other names in common use include 1,2-cyclic-inositol-phosphate phosphodiesterase, D-myo-inositol 1:2-cyclic phosphate 2-phosphohydrolase, D-inositol 1,2-cyclic phosphate 2-phosphohydrolase, D-myo-inositol 1,2-cyclic phosphate 2-phosphohydrolase, 1-D-myo-inositol-1,2-cyclic-phosphate 2-inositolphosphohydrolase, and inositol-1,2-cyclic-phosphate 2-inositolphosphohydrolase.

== See also ==
- Glycerophosphoinositol glycerophosphodiesterase which hydrolyses 1-(sn-glycero-3-phospho)-1D-myo-inositol to give sn-glycerol 3-phosphate and myo-inositol
