= Glycerophosphocholine cholinephosphodiesterase =

Class of enzymes

glycerophosphocholine cholinephosphodiesterase

Identifiers
- EC no.: 3.1.4.38
- CAS no.: 60063-78-7

Databases
- BRENDA: enzyme data
- ExPASy: NiceZyme view
- KEGG: enzyme entry
- MetaCyc: metabolic pathway
- Rhea: reactions
- PDB structures: RCSB PDB PDBe PDBsum
- Gene Ontology: AmiGO / QuickGO
Search
- PMC: articles
- PubMed: articles
- NCBI: proteins

The enzyme glycerophosphocholine cholinephosphodiesterase (EC 3.1.4.38) is an enzyme that catalyzes the reaction

glycerophosphorylcholine
H_{2}O
glycerol
+
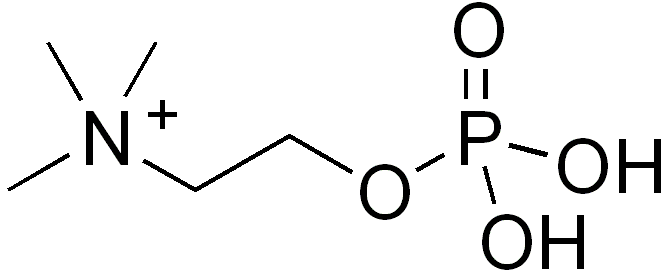
choline phosphate

The enzyme characterised from rat brain hydrolyses glycerophosphorylcholine to its components glycerol and choline phosphate.

This enzyme is a hydrolase, specifically one acting on phosphoric diester bonds. The systematic name is sn-glycero-3-phosphocholine cholinephosphohydrolase. This enzyme is also called L-3-glycerylphosphinicocholine cholinephosphohydrolase.

== Structural studies ==
As of late 2007, only one structure has been solved for this class of enzymes, with the PDB accession code PDB: 1WRA.

== See also ==
- Glycerophosphocholine phosphodiesterase which hydrolyses glycerophosphorylcholine to (R)-glyceryl 1-phosphate and choline
