= ACOT8 =

Protein-coding gene in the species Homo sapiens

Identifiers
- Aliases: ACOT8, HNAACTE, PTE-1, PTE-2, PTE1, PTE2, hACTE-III, hTE, NAP1, acyl-CoA thioesterase 8
- External IDs: OMIM: 608123; MGI: 2158201; GeneCards: ACOT8
Enzyme activity
EC #	BRENDA	ExPASy	KEGG	MetaCyc
3.1.2.1	↗	↗	↗	↗
3.1.2.2	↗	↗	↗	↗
3.1.2.3	↗	↗	↗	↗
3.1.2.5	↗	↗	↗	↗
3.1.2.11	↗	↗	↗	↗
3.1.2.27	↗	↗	↗	↗

Gene location (Human)
Chr.	Chromosome 20 (human)
Band	20q13.12	Start	45,841,721 bp
Band	20q13.12	End	45,857,405 bp

Gene location (Mouse)
Chr.	Chromosome 2 (mouse)
Band	2|2 H3	Start	164,634,685 bp
Band	2|2 H3	End	164,646,802 bp
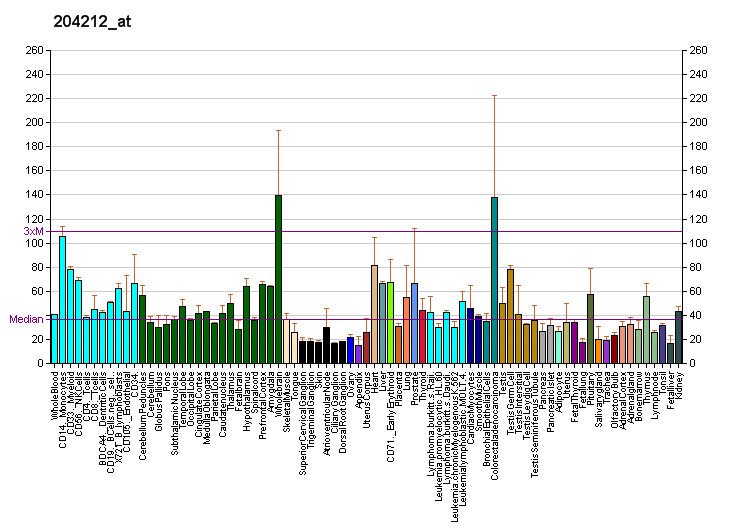
RNA expression pattern
Bgee	Human / Mouse (ortholog); Top expressed in: mucosa of transverse colon; right adrenal gland; right adrenal cortex; prefrontal cortex; left adrenal gland; left adrenal cortex; right frontal lobe; cingulate gyrus; anterior cingulate cortex; apex of heart / Top expressed in: spermatid; duodenum; right kidney; spermatocyte; proximal tubule; granulocyte; jejunum; colon; left colon; lip; More reference expression data
BioGPS	More reference expression data
Gene ontology
Molecular function	palmitoyl-CoA hydrolase activity; choloyl-CoA hydrolase activity; long-chain acyl-CoA hydrolase activity; carboxylic ester hydrolase activity; medium-chain acyl-CoA hydrolase activity; protein binding; signaling receptor binding; hydrolase activity; CoA hydrolase activity; acyl-CoA hydrolase activity; acetyl-CoA hydrolase activity; succinyl-CoA hydrolase activity; acetoacetyl-CoA hydrolase activity; hydroxymethylglutaryl-CoA hydrolase activity; myristoyl-CoA hydrolase activity
Cellular component	cytoplasm; peroxisome; peroxisomal matrix; cytosol
Biological process	peroxisome organization; negative regulation of CD4 production; alpha-linolenic acid metabolic process; peroxisome fission; dicarboxylic acid catabolic process; fatty acid beta-oxidation using acyl-CoA oxidase; viral process; bile acid biosynthetic process; fatty acid catabolic process; acyl-CoA metabolic process; protein targeting to peroxisome
Sources:Amigo / QuickGO
Orthologs
Databases	NCBI: entry; OMA: entry
Species	Human	Mouse
Entrez	10005	170789
Ensembl	ENSG00000101473	ENSMUSG00000017307
UniProt	O14734	P58137
RefSeq (mRNA)	NM_005469; NM_183385; NM_183386	NM_133240; NM_001362756; NM_001362757
RefSeq (protein)	NP_005460	NP_573503; NP_001349685; NP_001349686
Location (UCSC)	Chr 20: 45.84 – 45.86 Mb	Chr 2: 164.63 – 164.65 Mb
PubMed search
- Wikidata
View/Edit Human	View/Edit Mouse

Acyl-coenzyme A thioesterase 8 is an enzyme that in humans is encoded by the ACOT8 gene.

The protein encoded by this gene is a peroxisomal thioesterase that appears to be involved more in the oxidation of fatty acids rather than in their formation. The encoded protein can bind to the human immunodeficiency virus-1 protein Nef, and mediate Nef-induced down-regulation of CD4 in T-cells. Multiple transcript variants encoding several different isoforms have been found for this gene.
