= Succinyl-CoA hydrolase =

Class of enzymes

Identifiers
- EC no.: 3.1.2.3
- CAS no.: 9025-86-9

Databases
- BRENDA: enzyme data
- ExPASy: NiceZyme view
- KEGG: enzyme entry
- MetaCyc: metabolic pathway
- Rhea: reactions
- PDB structures: RCSB PDB PDBe PDBsum
- Gene Ontology: AmiGO / QuickGO
Search
- PMC: articles
- PubMed: articles
- NCBI: proteins

The enzyme succinyl-CoA hydrolase (EC 3.1.2.3) catalyzes the reaction

succinyl-CoA
H_{2}O
coenzyme A
+
succinic acid

The enzyme characterised from pig heart hydrolyses succinyl-CoA to coenzyme A and succinic acid. The enzyme and succinic acid are part of the citric acid cycle.

This enzyme is a hydrolase, specifically one acting on thioester bonds. The systematic name is succinyl-CoA hydrolase. Other names in common use include succinyl-CoA acylase, succinyl coenzyme A hydrolase, and succinyl coenzyme A deacylase.
