= ACSS2 =

Protein-coding gene in the species Homo sapiens

Identifiers
- Aliases: ACSS2, ACAS2, ACS, ACSA, dJ1161H23.1, acyl-CoA synthetase short chain family member 2, Acetyl-Coenzyme A Synthetase 2, Acetyl-Coenzyme A Synthetase, Cytoplasmic, ACECS1, ACECS
- External IDs: OMIM: 605832; MGI: 1890410; HomoloGene: 6469; GeneCards: ACSS2; OMA:ACSS2 - orthologs

Gene location (Human)
Chr.	Chromosome 20 (human)
Band	20q11.22	Start	34,872,146 bp
Band	20q11.22	End	34,927,962 bp

Gene location (Mouse)
Chr.	Chromosome 2 (mouse)
Band	2|2 H1	Start	155,359,868 bp
Band	2|2 H1	End	155,427,644 bp
RNA expression pattern
Bgee	Human / Mouse (ortholog); Top expressed in: mucosa of ileum; mucosa of transverse colon; rectum; muscle of thigh; gastric mucosa; tibialis anterior muscle; right adrenal cortex; right lung; gastrocnemius muscle; apex of heart / Top expressed in: tunica adventitia of aorta; right kidney; brown adipose tissue; left lobe of liver; olfactory epithelium; left colon; proximal tubule; human kidney; interventricular septum; soleus muscle; More reference expression data
BioGPS	n/a
Gene ontology
Molecular function	nucleotide binding; ligase activity; AMP binding; catalytic activity; ATP binding; acetate-CoA ligase activity
Cellular component	intracellular membrane-bounded organelle; nucleoplasm; cytoplasm; cytosol; mitochondrial matrix
Biological process	metabolism; lipid biosynthetic process; acetyl-CoA biosynthetic process from acetate; acetyl-CoA biosynthetic process; acetate biosynthetic process; propionate biosynthetic process; ethanol oxidation
Sources:Amigo / QuickGO
Orthologs
Species	Human	Mouse
Entrez	55902	60525
Ensembl	ENSG00000131069	ENSMUSG00000027605
UniProt	Q9NR19	Q9QXG4
RefSeq (mRNA)	NM_001076552; NM_001242393; NM_018677; NM_139274	NM_019811
RefSeq (protein)	NP_001070020; NP_001229322; NP_061147	NP_062785
Location (UCSC)	Chr 20: 34.87 – 34.93 Mb	Chr 2: 155.36 – 155.43 Mb
PubMed search
- Wikidata
View/Edit Human	View/Edit Mouse

Acyl-coenzyme A synthetase short-chain family member 2 is an enzyme that in humans is encoded by the ACSS2 gene.

== Function ==
This gene encodes a cytosolic enzyme that catalyzes the activation of acetate for use in lipid synthesis and energy generation. The protein acts as a monomer and produces acetyl-CoA from acetate in a reaction that requires ATP. It is also essential for the production of Crotonyl-CoA which activates its target genes by crotonylation of histone tails. Expression of this gene is regulated by sterol regulatory element-binding proteins, transcription factors that activate genes required for the synthesis of cholesterol and unsaturated fatty acids. Two transcript variants encoding different isoforms have been found for this gene.

Metabolic production of acetyl-CoA is linked to histone acetylation and gene regulation. In mouse neurons, Mews et al. identified a major role for the ACSS2 pathway to regulate histone acetylation and neuronal gene expression. Histone acetylation in mature neurons is associated strongly with memory formation. Chromatin becomes acetylated in specific regions of the brain, such as the hippocampus, in response to neuronal activity or behavioral training in rodent. Such acetylation correlates with the increased expression of a set of 'immediate early' genes, which encode proteins that broadly mediate changes in the strength of connections between neurons, therefore facilitating memory consolidation. In the mouse hippocampus, ACSS2 binds directly to immediate early genes to 'fuel' local histone acetylation and, in turn, their induction for long-term spatial memory.
