= ACOT7 =

Protein-coding gene in humans

Identifiers
- Aliases: ACOT7, ACH1, ACT, BACH, CTE-II, LACH, LACH1, hBACH, acyl-CoA thioesterase 7
- External IDs: OMIM: 602587; MGI: 1917275; GeneCards: ACOT7
Available structures
PDB	Ortholog search: PDBe RCSB
PDB	List of PDB id codes 2QQ2
Enzyme activity
EC #	BRENDA	ExPASy	KEGG	MetaCyc
3.1.2.2	↗	↗	↗	↗

Gene location (Human)
Chr.	Chromosome 1 (human)
Band	1p36.31	Start	6,264,269 bp
Band	1p36.31	End	6,393,767 bp

Gene location (Mouse)
Chr.	Chromosome 4 (mouse)
Band	4|4 E2	Start	152,262,591 bp
Band	4|4 E2	End	152,356,312 bp
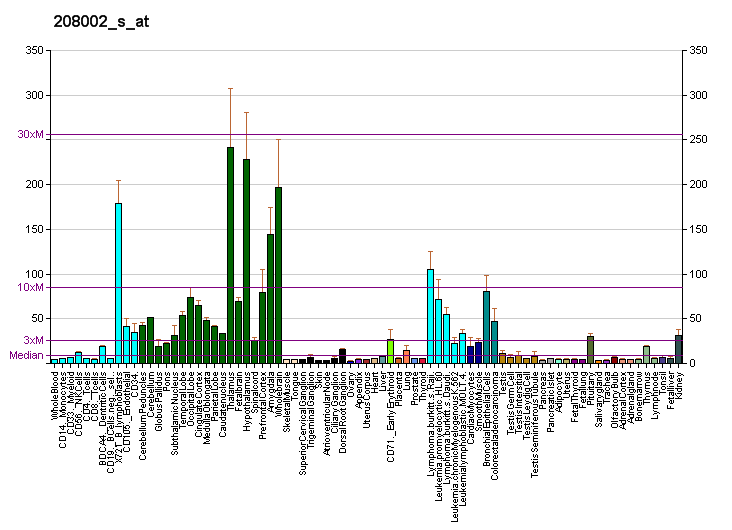

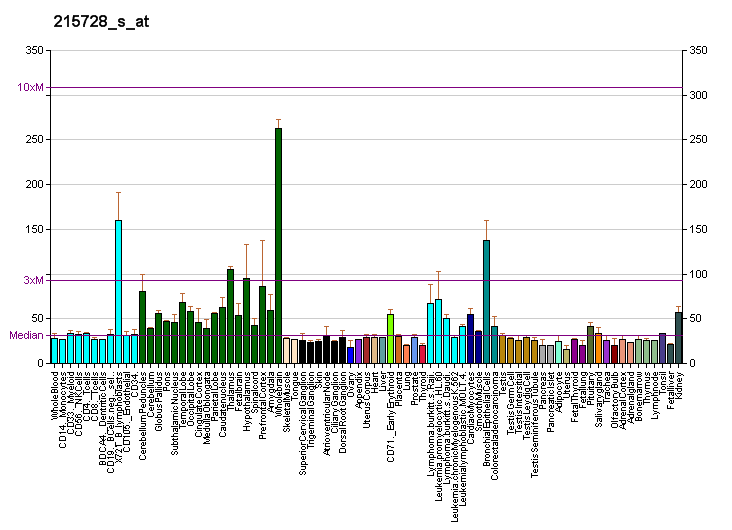
RNA expression pattern
Bgee	Human / Mouse (ortholog); Top expressed in: lateral nuclear group of thalamus; prefrontal cortex; right frontal lobe; Brodmann area 9; pars compacta; pons; endothelial cell; anterior cingulate cortex; middle temporal gyrus; spinal ganglia / Top expressed in: seminiferous tubule; anterior horn of spinal cord; medial dorsal nucleus; facial motor nucleus; dentate gyrus of hippocampal formation granule cell; central gray substance of midbrain; medulla oblongata; nucleus of stria terminalis; medial vestibular nucleus; perirhinal cortex; More reference expression data
BioGPS	More reference expression data
Gene ontology
Molecular function	palmitoyl-CoA hydrolase activity; fatty-acyl-CoA binding; protein homodimerization activity; carboxylic ester hydrolase activity; long-chain fatty acyl-CoA binding; protein binding; hydrolase activity; acyl-CoA hydrolase activity; myristoyl-CoA hydrolase activity; thiolester hydrolase activity
Cellular component	cytosol; nucleoplasm; mitochondrion; extracellular exosome; cytoplasm
Biological process	medium-chain fatty acid biosynthetic process; medium-chain fatty-acyl-CoA catabolic process; long-chain fatty-acyl-CoA catabolic process; coenzyme A biosynthetic process; palmitic acid biosynthetic process; acyl-CoA metabolic process; lipid metabolism; fatty acid metabolic process
Sources:Amigo / QuickGO
Orthologs
Databases	NCBI: entry; OMA: entry
Species	Human	Mouse
Entrez	11332	70025
Ensembl	ENSG00000097021	ENSMUSG00000028937
UniProt	O00154	Q91V12
RefSeq (mRNA)	NM_181866; NM_007274; NM_181862; NM_181863; NM_181864 NM_181865	NM_001146057; NM_001146058; NM_133348; NM_001369273; NM_001369274 NM_001369275; NM_001369276
RefSeq (protein)	NP_009205; NP_863654; NP_863655; NP_863656	NP_001139529; NP_001139530; NP_579926; NP_001356202; NP_001356203 NP_001356204; NP_001356205
Location (UCSC)	Chr 1: 6.26 – 6.39 Mb	Chr 4: 152.26 – 152.36 Mb
PubMed search
- Wikidata
View/Edit Human	View/Edit Mouse

Cytosolic acyl coenzyme A thioester hydrolase is an enzyme that in humans is encoded by the ACOT7 gene.

This gene encodes a member of the acyl coenzyme family. The encoded protein hydrolyzes the CoA thioester of palmitoyl-CoA and other long-chain fatty acids. Decreased expression of this gene may be associated with mesial temporal lobe epilepsy. Alternatively spliced transcript variants encoding distinct isoforms with different subcellular locations have been characterized.
