= Acyl-CoA hydrolase =

InterPro Family

acyl-CoA hydrolase

Identifiers
- EC no.: 3.1.2.20
- CAS no.: 37270-64-7

Databases
- IntEnz: IntEnz view
- BRENDA: BRENDA entry
- ExPASy: NiceZyme view
- KEGG: KEGG entry
- MetaCyc: metabolic pathway
- PRIAM: profile
- PDB structures: RCSB PDB PDBe PDBsum
- Gene Ontology: AmiGO / QuickGO
Search
- PMC: articles
- PubMed: articles
- NCBI: proteins

The enzyme acyl-CoA hydrolase (EC 3.1.2.20) catalyzes the reaction

acyl-CoA + H_{2}O $\rightleftharpoons$ CoA + a carboxylate

This enzyme belongs to the family of hydrolases, specifically those acting on thioester bonds. The systematic name of this enzyme class is acyl-CoA hydrolase. Other names in common use include acyl coenzyme A thioesterase, acyl-CoA thioesterase, acyl coenzyme A hydrolase, thioesterase B, thioesterase II, and acyl-CoA thioesterase.

== Structural studies ==
As of late 2007, two structures have been solved for this class of enzymes, with PDB accession codes 1Y7U and 2GVH.
