= Glycerophosphoinositol glycerophosphodiesterase =

Class of enzymes

glycerophosphoinositol glycerophosphodiesterase

Identifiers
- EC no.: 3.1.4.44
- CAS no.: 72414-13-2

Databases
- BRENDA: enzyme data
- ExPASy: NiceZyme view
- KEGG: enzyme entry
- MetaCyc: metabolic pathway
- Rhea: reactions
- PDB structures: RCSB PDB PDBe PDBsum
- Gene Ontology: AmiGO / QuickGO
Search
- PMC: articles
- PubMed: articles
- NCBI: proteins

The enzyme glycerophosphoinositol glycerophosphodiesterase (EC 3.1.4.44) catalyzes the reaction

1-(sn-glycero-3-phospho)-1D-myo-inositol
H_{2}O
sn-glycerol 3-phosphate
+
myo-inositol

The enzyme characterised from rat and Bacillus pumilus hydrolyses 1-(sn-glycero-3-phospho)-1D-myo-inositol to its components sn-glycerol 3-phosphate and myo-inositol.

This enzyme is a hydrolase, specifically one acting on phosphoric diester bonds. The systematic name is 1-(sn-glycero-3-phospho)-1D-myo-inositol glycerophosphohydrolase. Other names in common use include sn-glycero(3)phosphoinositol glycerophosphohydrolase, and sn-glycero-3-phospho-1-inositol glycerophosphohydrolase.

== See also ==
- Glycerophosphoinositol inositolphosphodiesterase which hydrolyses 1-(sn-glycero-3-phospho)-1D-myo-inositol to give glycerol and inositol monophosphate
