= Delta12-fatty acid dehydrogenase =

Enzyme

delta12-fatty acid dehydrogenase

Identifiers
- EC no.: 1.14.99.33

Databases
- IntEnz: IntEnz view
- BRENDA: BRENDA entry
- ExPASy: NiceZyme view
- KEGG: KEGG entry
- MetaCyc: metabolic pathway
- PRIAM: profile
- PDB structures: RCSB PDB PDBe PDBsum
- Gene Ontology: AmiGO / QuickGO
Search
- PMC: articles
- PubMed: articles
- NCBI: proteins

In enzymology, a Delta12-fatty acid dehydrogenase (EC 1.14.99.33) is an enzyme that catalyzes the chemical reaction

linoleate + 2AH + O_{2} $\rightleftharpoons$ crepenynate + 2A + H_{2}O

where AH is either NADH or NADPH.

The 3 substrates of this enzyme are linoleate, 2AH, and O_{2}, whereas its 3 products are crepenynate, 2A, and H_{2}O.

This enzyme belongs to the family of oxidoreductases, specifically those acting on paired donors, with O2 as oxidant and incorporation or reduction of oxygen. The oxygen incorporated need not be derive from O miscellaneous.

This enzyme participates in linoleic acid metabolism.

== Nomenclature ==
The systematic name of this enzyme class is linoleate, hydrogen-donor:oxygen oxidoreductase (Delta12-unsaturating). Other names in common use include

- crepenynate synthase and
- linoleate Delta12-fatty acid acetylenase (desaturase).
