= Glycerophosphodiester phosphodiesterase =

glycerophosphodiester phosphodiesterase

Identifiers
- EC no.: 3.1.4.46
- CAS no.: 86280-59-3

Databases
- BRENDA: enzyme data
- ExPASy: NiceZyme view
- KEGG: enzyme entry
- MetaCyc: metabolic pathway
- Rhea: reactions
- PDB structures: RCSB PDB PDBe PDBsum
- Gene Ontology: AmiGO / QuickGO
Search
- PMC: articles
- PubMed: articles
- NCBI: proteins

Glycerophosphodiester phosphodiesterase

Identifiers
- Symbol: GDP
- Pfam: PF03009
- Membranome: 584
Available protein structures:
- PDB: PF03009 (ECOD; PDBsum)
- AlphaFold: PF03009

The enzyme glycerophosphodiester phosphodiesterase ({EC 3.1.4.46) catalyzes the general reaction

a glycerophosphodiester + H_{2}O $\rightleftharpoons$ an alcohol + sn-glycerol 3-phosphate

For example, the enzyme characterised from Escherichia coli hydrolyses glycerophosphorylcholine into its components, sn-glycerol 3-phosphate and choline:

glycerophosphorylcholine
H_{2}O
sn-glycerol 3-phosphate
+
choline

This is the same reaction as catalysed by glycerophosphocholine phosphodiesterase (EC 3.1.4.2).

This enzyme is a hydrolase, specifically one acting on phosphoric diester bonds. The systematic name is glycerophosphodiester glycerophosphohydrolase. Other names in common use include gene hpd protein, glycerophosphoryl diester phosphodiesterase, and IgD-binding protein D.
