= Glycerol-1,2-cyclic-phosphate 2-phosphodiesterase =

Class of enzymes

glycerol-1,2-cyclic-phosphate 2-phosphodiesterase

Identifiers
- EC no.: 3.1.4.42
- CAS no.: 69458-89-5

Databases
- BRENDA: enzyme data
- ExPASy: NiceZyme view
- KEGG: enzyme entry
- MetaCyc: metabolic pathway
- Rhea: reactions
- PDB structures: RCSB PDB PDBe PDBsum
- Gene Ontology: AmiGO / QuickGO
Search
- PMC: articles
- PubMed: articles
- NCBI: proteins

The enzyme glycerol-1,2-cyclic-phosphate 2-phosphodiesterase (EC 3.1.4.42) catalyzes the reaction

glycerol 1,2-cyclic phosphate
H_{2}O
glycerol 3-phosphate

The enzyme characterised from mammals hydrolyses both enantiomers of glycerol 1,2-cyclic phosphate to glycerol 3-phosphate.

This enzyme is a hydrolase, specifically, one acting on phosphoric diester bonds. The systematic name is rac-glycerol-1,2-cyclic-phosphate 2-glycerophosphohydrolase. This enzyme is also called rac-glycerol 1:2-cyclic phosphate 2-phosphodiesterase.
