= Formyl-CoA hydrolase =

formyl-CoA hydrolase

Identifiers
- EC no.: 3.1.2.10
- CAS no.: 9025-91-6

Databases
- IntEnz: IntEnz view
- BRENDA: BRENDA entry
- ExPASy: NiceZyme view
- KEGG: KEGG entry
- MetaCyc: metabolic pathway
- PRIAM: profile
- PDB structures: RCSB PDB PDBe PDBsum
- Gene Ontology: AmiGO / QuickGO
Search
- PMC: articles
- PubMed: articles
- NCBI: proteins

The enzyme formyl-CoA hydrolase (EC 3.1.2.10) catalyzes the reaction

formyl-CoA + H_{2}O $\rightleftharpoons$ CoA + formate

This enzyme belongs to the family of hydrolases, specifically those acting on thioester bonds. The systematic name is formyl-CoA hydrolase. This enzyme is also called formyl coenzyme A hydrolase. This enzyme participates in glyoxylate and dicarboxylate metabolism.
