= Glycerophosphocholine phosphodiesterase =

Class of enzymes

glycerophosphocholine phosphodiesterase

Identifiers
- EC no.: 3.1.4.2
- CAS no.: 9025-85-8

Databases
- BRENDA: enzyme data
- ExPASy: NiceZyme view
- KEGG: enzyme entry
- MetaCyc: metabolic pathway
- Rhea: reactions
- PDB structures: RCSB PDB PDBe PDBsum
- Gene Ontology: AmiGO / QuickGO
Search
- PMC: articles
- PubMed: articles
- NCBI: proteins

The enzyme glycerophosphocholine phosphodiesterase (EC 3.1.4.2) catalyzes the reaction

glycerophosphorylcholine
H_{2}O
sn-glycerol 3-phosphate
+
choline

The enzyme characterised from bacteria and liver hydrolyses glycerophosphorylcholine to its components (R)-glyceryl 1-phosphate and choline. Glycerophosphorylcholine is an osmolyte and this enzyme regulates its level. The glycerophosphocholine pathway of which this is a part is implicated in carcinogenesis and tumor progression.

This enzyme is a hydrolase, specifically one acting on phosphoric diester bonds. The systematic name is sn-glycero-3-phosphocholine glycerophosphohydrolase. Other names in common use include glycerophosphinicocholine diesterase, glycerylphosphorylcholinediesterase, sn-glycero-3-phosphorylcholine diesterase, glycerolphosphorylcholine phosphodiesterase, and glycerophosphohydrolase.

== See also ==
- Glycerophosphocholine cholinephosphodiesterase which hydrolyses glycerophosphorylcholine to glycerol and choline phosphate
