= Dehydrogenase =

Class of enzymes

A dehydrogenase is an enzyme belonging to the group of oxidoreductases that oxidizes a substrate by reducing an electron acceptor, usually NAD^{+}/NADP^{+} or a flavin coenzyme such as FAD or FMN. Like all catalysts, they catalyze reverse as well as forward reactions, and in some cases this has physiological significance: for example, alcohol dehydrogenase catalyzes the oxidation of ethanol to acetaldehyde in animals, but in yeast it catalyzes the production of ethanol from acetaldehyde.

== IUBMB classification ==
Oxidoreductases, enzymes that catalyze oxidation-reduction reactions, constitute Class EC 1 of the IUBMB classification of enzyme-catalyzed reactions. Any of these may be called dehydrogenases, especially those in which NAD^{+} is the electron acceptor (oxidant), but reductase is also used when the physiological emphasis on reduction of the substrate, and oxidase is used only when O_{2} is the electron acceptor. The systematic name of an oxidoreductase is "donor:acceptor oxidoreductase", but, when possible, it is more conveniently named as "donor dehydrogenase".

== Reactions catalyzed ==
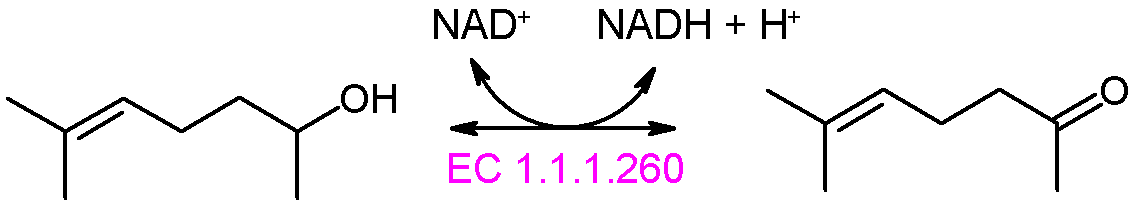
A reaction catalyzed by a reductase enzyme

Dehydrogenases oxidize a substrate by transferring hydrogen to an electron acceptor, common electron acceptors being NAD^{+} or FAD. This would be considered an oxidation of the substrate, in which the substrate either loses hydrogen atoms or gains an oxygen atom (from water). The name "dehydrogenase" is based on the idea that it facilitates the removal (de-) of hydrogen (-hydrogen-) and is an enzyme (-ase). Dehydrogenase reactions come most commonly in two forms: the transfer of a hydride and release of a proton (often with water as a second reactant), and the transfer of two hydrogens.

=== Transferring a hydride and releasing a proton ===
Sometimes a dehydrogenase catalyzed reaction will look like this: AH + B^{+} ↔ A^{+} + BH when a hydride is transferred.

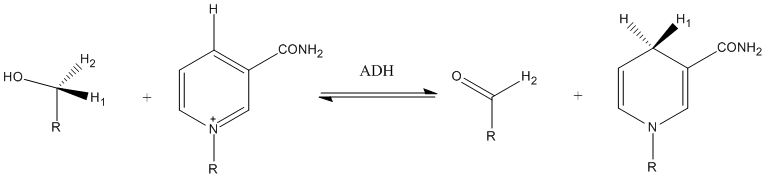
Alcohol dehydrogenase oxidizes ethanol, with the help of the electron carrier NAD^{+}, yielding acetaldehyde

A represents the substrate that will be oxidized, while B is the hydride acceptor. Note how when the hydride is transferred from A to B, the A has taken on a positive charge; this is because the enzyme has taken two electrons from the substrate in order to reduce the acceptor to BH.

The result of a dehydrogenase catalyzed reaction is not always the acquisition of a positive charge. Sometimes the substrate loses a proton. This may leave free electrons on the substrate that move into a double bond. This happens frequently when an alcohol is the substrate; when the proton on the oxygen leaves, the free electrons on the oxygen will be used to create a double bond, as seen in the oxidation of ethanol to acetaldehyde carried out by alcohol dehydrogenase in the image on the right.

Another possibility is that a water molecule will enter the reaction, contributing a hydroxide ion to the substrate and a proton to the environment. The net result on the substrate is the addition of one oxygen atom. This is seen for example in the oxidation of acetaldehyde to acetic acid by acetaldehyde dehydrogenase, a step in the metabolism of ethanol and in the production of vinegar.

=== Transferring two hydrogens ===
Reaction catalyzed by succinate dehydrogenase, note the double bond formed between the two central carbons when two hydrogens are removed

In the above case, the dehydrogenase has transferred a hydride while releasing a proton, H^{+}, but dehydrogenases can also transfer two hydrogens, using FAD as an electron acceptor. This would be depicted as AH_{2} + B ↔ A + BH_{2}. A double bond is normally formed in between the two atoms that the hydrogens were taken from, as in the case of succinate dehydrogenase. The two hydrogens have been transferred to the carrier or the other product, with their electrons.

=== Identifying a dehydrogenase reaction ===
The distinction between the subclasses of oxidoreductases that catalyze oxidation reactions lies in their electron acceptors.

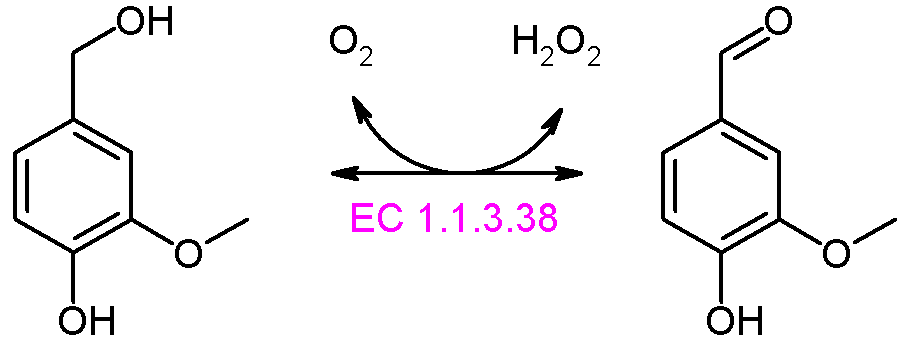
Reaction catalyzed by an oxidase, note the reduction of oxygen as the electron acceptor

Dehydrogenase and oxidase are easily distinguishable if one considers the electron acceptor. An oxidase will remove electrons from a substrate as well, but only uses oxygen as its electron acceptor. One such reaction is: AH_{2} + O_{2} ↔ A + H_{2}O_{2}.

Sometimes an oxidase reaction will look like this: 4A + 4H^{+} + O_{2} ↔ 4A^{+} + 2H_{2}O. In this case, the enzyme is taking electrons from the substrate, and using free protons to reduce the oxygen, leaving the substrate with a positive charge. The product is water, instead of hydrogen peroxide as seen above. An example of an oxidase that functions like this is complex IV in the Electron Transport Chain (ETC).

Note that oxidases typically transfer the equivalent of dihydrogen (H_{2}), and the acceptor is a dioxygen. Similarly, a peroxidase (another subclass of oxidoreductases) will use a peroxide (H_{2}O_{2}) as the electron acceptor, rather than an oxygen.

== Electron acceptors ==
Nicotinamide Adenine Dinucleotide

Dehydrogenase enzymes transfer electrons from the substrate to an electron carrier; what carrier is used depends on the reaction taking place. Common electron acceptors used by this subclass are NAD^{+}, FAD, and NADP^{+}. Electron carriers are reduced in this process and considered oxidizers of the substrate. Electron carriers are coenzymes that are often referred to as "redox cofactors."

=== NAD^{+} ===
NAD^{+}, or nicotinamide adenine dinucleotide, is a dinucleotide, containing two nucleotides. One of the nucleotides it contains is an adenine group, while the other is nicotinamide. In order to reduce this molecule, a hydrogen and two electrons must be added to the 6-carbon ring of nicotinamide; one electron is added to the carbon opposite the positively charged nitrogen, causing a rearrangement of bonds within the ring to give nitrogen more electrons; it will lose its positive charge as a result. The other electron is "stolen" from an additional hydrogen, leaving the hydrogen ion in solution.

Reduction of NAD^{+}: NAD^{+} + 2H^{+} + 2e^{−} ↔ NADH + H^{+}

NAD^{+} is mostly used in catabolic pathways, such as glycolysis, that break down energy molecules to produce ATP. The ratio of NAD^{+} to NADH is kept very high in the cell, keeping it readily available to act as an oxidizing agent.

Nicotinamide Adenine Dinucleotide Phosphate

=== NADP^{+} ===
NADP^{+} differs from NAD^{+} only in the addition of a phosphate group to the adenosine 5-membered carbon ring. The addition of the phosphate does not alter the electron transport abilities of the carrier. The phosphate group creates enough contrast between the two groups that they bind to the active site of different enzymes, generally catalyzing different types of reactions.

These two electron carriers are easily distinguished by enzymes and participate in very different reactions. NADP^{+} mainly functions with enzymes that catalyze anabolic, or biosynthetic, pathways. Specifically, NADPH will act as a reducing agent in these reactions, resulting in NADP^{+}. These are pathways that convert substrates to more complicated products, using ATP. The reasoning behind having two separate electron carriers for anabolic and catabolic pathways relates to regulation of metabolism. The ratio of NADP^{+} to NADPH in the cell is kept rather low, so that NADPH is readily available as a reducing agent; it is more commonly used as a reducing agent than NADP^{+} is used as an oxidizing agent.

=== FAD ===
Flavin Adenine Dinucleotide

FAD, or flavin adenine dinucleotide, is a prosthetic group (a non-polypeptide unit bound to a protein that is required for function) that consists of an adenine nucleotide and a flavin mononucleotide. FAD is a unique electron acceptor. Its fully reduced form is FADH_{2} (known as the hydroquinone form), but FAD can also be partially oxidized as FADH by either reducing FAD or oxidizing FADH_{2}. Dehydrogenases typically fully reduce FAD to FADH_{2}. The production of FADH is rare.

The double-bonded nitrogen atoms in FAD make it a good acceptor in taking two hydrogen atoms from a substrate. Because it takes two atoms rather than one, FAD is often involved when a double bond is formed in the newly oxidized substrate. FAD is unique because it is reduced by two electrons and two protons, as opposed to both NAD^{+} and NADP, which only take one proton.

== Examples ==
=== Biological implications ===
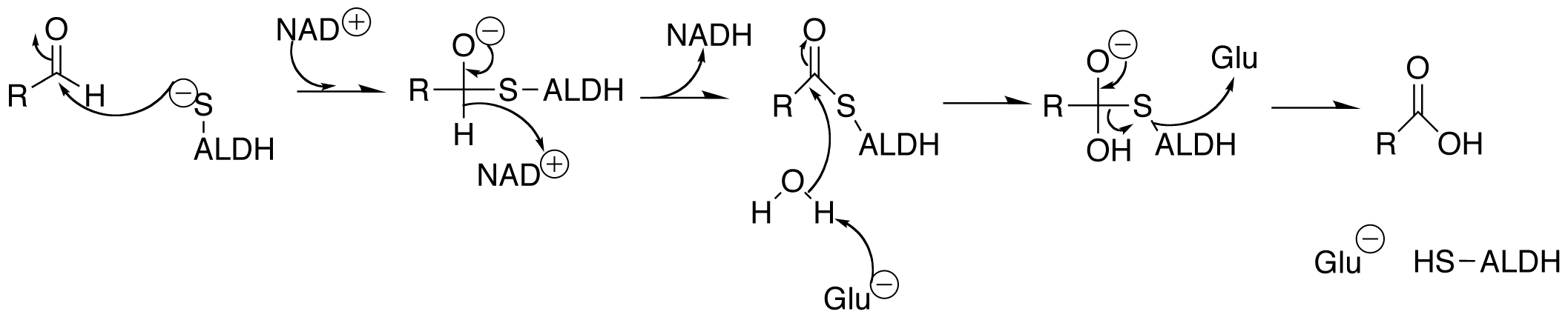
The mechanism of an aldehyde dehydrogenase, note the use of NAD^{+} as an electron acceptor.

Aldehydes are the natural by-product of many physiological processes, as well as being the consequence of many industrial processes, put out into the environment in the form of smog and motor vehicle exhaust. Build-up of aldehydes in the brain and pericardium can be detrimental to a person's health, as they can form adducts with important molecules and cause their inactivation.

Considering how prevalent aldehydes are, there must be an enzyme to facilitate their oxidation to a less volatile compound. Aldehyde dehydrogenases (ALDH) are NAD^{+} dependent enzymes that function to remove toxic aldehydes from the body, functioning mostly in the mitochondria of cells. These enzymes are largely responsible for the detoxification of acetylaldehyde, which is an intermediate in the metabolism of ethanol. It has been shown that a mutation in the ALDH2 gene (one of 19 aldehyde dehydrogenase genes) is what leads to the common occurrence in East Asian population of a flushed face after consuming alcohol, due to the build-up of acetaldehyde. This build-up of acetaldehyde also causes headaches and vomiting (hangover symptoms) if not broken down quickly enough, another reason why those with acetaldehyde DH deficiencies have bad reactions to alcohol. Importantly, a lack of this enzyme has been linked to an increase in the risk of myocardial infarction, while activation has shown the enzyme's ability to reduce damage caused by ischaemia.

Deactivation of aldehyde dehydrogenases has been shown to be instrumental in the mechanisms of many cancers. ALDHs function in cell differentiation, proliferation, oxidation, and drug resistance. These enzymes are only one example of the many different types of dehydrogenases in the human body; their wide array of functions, and the impact that their deactivation or mutations has upon crucial cell processes underscores the importance of all dehydrogenases in maintaining body homeostasis.

=== More examples ===
- acetaldehyde dehydrogenase
- alcohol dehydrogenase
- Delta12-fatty acid dehydrogenase
- glutamate dehydrogenase (an enzyme that can convert glutamate to α-Ketoglutarate and vice versa).
- lactate dehydrogenase (used to convert NADH back to NAD^{+} in anaerobic glycolysis, and in the back reaction to produce NADH)
- pyruvate dehydrogenase (A common enzyme that feeds the TCA Cycle by converting pyruvate to acetyl CoA, using NAD^{+}. In this reaction, the substrate not only is oxidized but also loses a carbon dioxide molecule, and is attached to the CoA coenzyme.)
- glucose-6-phosphate dehydrogenase (involved in the pentose phosphate pathway, producing NADPH)
- glyceraldehyde-3-phosphate dehydrogenase (involved in glycolysis, uses NAD^{+})
- sorbitol dehydrogenase

TCA cycle examples:

- isocitrate dehydrogenase (uses NAD^{+}, also has an isozyme that uses NADP)
- alpha-ketoglutarate dehydrogenase (uses NAD^{+})
- succinate dehydrogenase (uses FAD)
- malate dehydrogenase (uses NAD^{+})
