= Calcium ATPase =

Class of enzymes

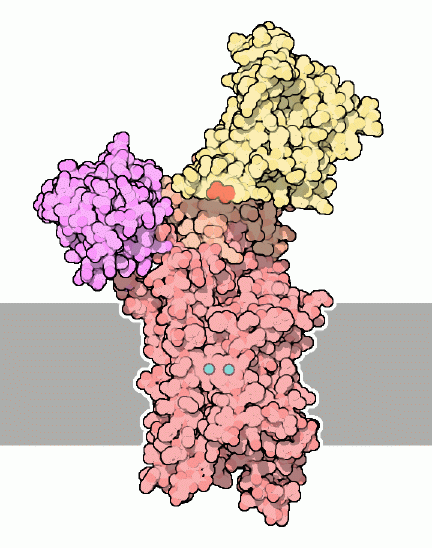
- Calcium ATPase

Identifiers
- EC no.: 7.2.2.10

Databases
- IntEnz: IntEnz view
- BRENDA: BRENDA entry
- ExPASy: NiceZyme view
- KEGG: KEGG entry
- MetaCyc: metabolic pathway
- PRIAM: profile
- PDB structures: RCSB PDB PDBe PDBsum
Search
- PMC: articles
- PubMed: articles
- NCBI: proteins

Ca^{2+} ATPase is a form of P-ATPase that transfers calcium after a muscle has contracted. The three kinds of calcium ATPase are:

- Plasma membrane Ca^{2+} ATPase (PMCA)
- Sarcoplasmic reticulum Ca^{2+} ATPase (SERCA)
- Secretory Pathway Ca^{2+} ATPase (SPCA)

Calcium ATPases belong to a family of P-type primary ion transport ATPases that form an aspartyl phosphate intermediate.

== Plasma membrane Ca^{2+} ATPase (PMCA) ==
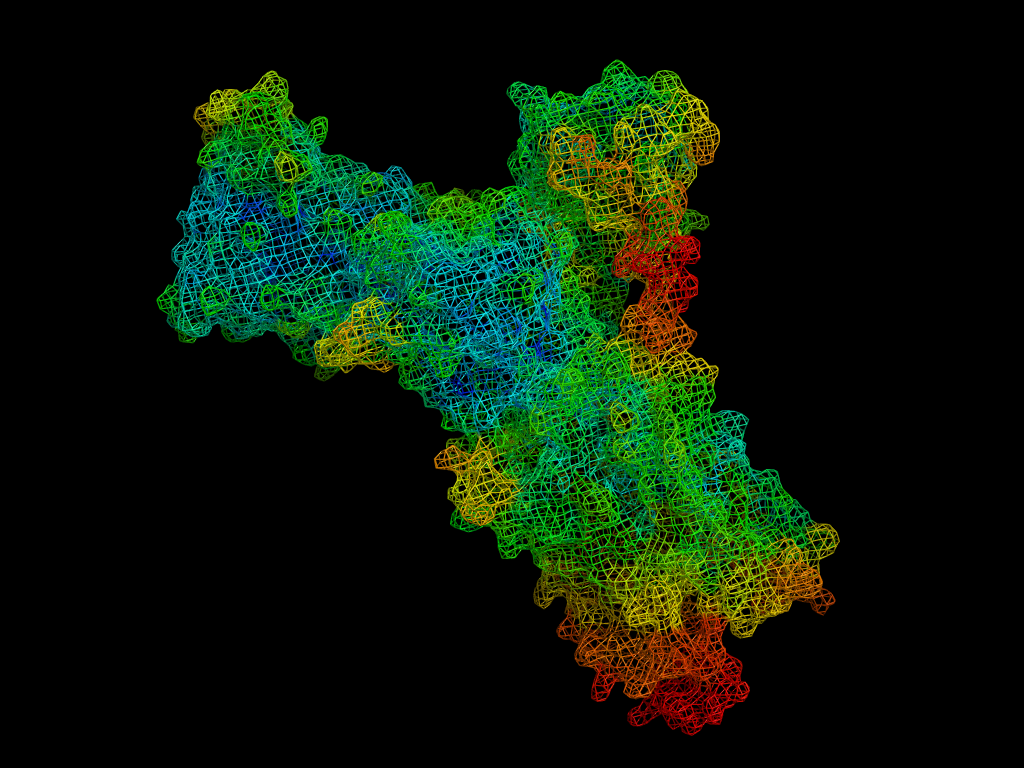
Rendered image of the Ca^{2+} pump

Plasma membrane Ca^{2+} ATPase (PMCA) is a transport protein in the plasma membrane of cells that serves to remove calcium (Ca^{2+}) from the cell. It is vital for regulating the amount of Ca^{2+} within cells. In fact, the PMCA is involved in removing Ca^{2+} from all eukaryotic cells. There is a very large transmembrane electrochemical gradient of Ca^{2+} driving the entry of the ion into cells, yet it is very important for cells to maintain low concentrations of Ca^{2+} for proper cell signalling; thus it is necessary for the cell to employ ion pumps to remove the Ca^{2+}. The PMCA and the sodium calcium exchanger (NCX) are together the main regulators of intracellular Ca^{2+} concentrations. Since it transports Ca^{2+} into the extracellular space, the PMCA is also an important regulator of the calcium concentration in the extracellular space.

The PMCA is expressed in a variety of tissues, including the brain.

== Sarcoendoplasmic Reticulum Ca^{2+} ATPase (SERCA) ==
In myocytes (muscle cells) Ca^{2+} is normally sequestered (isolated) in a specialized form of endoplasmic reticulum (ER) called sarcoplasmic reticulum (SR). It is a Ca^{2+} ATPase that transfers Ca^{2+} from the cytosol of the cell to the lumen of the SR at the expense of ATP hydrolysis during muscle relaxation. In the skeletal muscles the calcium pump in the sarcoplasmic reticulum membrane works in harmony with similar calcium pumps in the plasma membrane. This ensures that the cytosolic concentration of free calcium in resting muscle is below 0.1 μM. The sarcoplasmic and endoplasmic reticulum calcium pumps are closely related in structure and mechanism, and both are inhibited by the tumor-promoting agent thapsigargin, which does not affect the plasma membrane Ca^{2+} pumps.

== See also ==
- Active transport#Counter-transport
