= Endomembrane system =

Membranes in the cytoplasm of a eukaryotic cell

Detail of the endomembrane system and its components

The endomembrane system is composed of the different membranes (endomembranes) that are suspended in the cytoplasm within a eukaryotic cell. These membranes divide the cell into functional and structural compartments, or organelles. In eukaryotes the organelles of the endomembrane system include: the nuclear membrane, the endoplasmic reticulum, the Golgi apparatus, lysosomes, vesicles, endosomes, and cell membrane among others. The system is defined more accurately as the set of membranes that forms a single functional and developmental unit, either being connected directly, or exchanging material through vesicle transport. Importantly, the endomembrane system does not include the membranes of plastids or mitochondria, but might have evolved partially from the actions of the latter (see below).

The nuclear membrane contains a lipid bilayer that encompasses the contents of the nucleus. The endoplasmic reticulum (ER) is a synthesis and transport organelle that branches into the cytoplasm in plant and animal cells. The Golgi apparatus is a series of multiple compartments where molecules are packaged for delivery to other cell components or for secretion from the cell. Vacuoles, which are found in both plant and animal cells (though much bigger in plant cells), are responsible for maintaining the shape and structure of the cell as well as storing waste products. A vesicle is a relatively small, membrane-enclosed sac that stores or transports substances. The cell membrane is a protective barrier that regulates what enters and leaves the cell. There is also an organelle known as the Spitzenkörper that is only found in fungi, and is connected with hyphal tip growth.

In prokaryotes endomembranes are rare, although in many photosynthetic bacteria the cell membrane is highly folded and most of the cell cytoplasm is filled with layers of light-gathering membrane. These light-gathering membranes may even form enclosed structures called chlorosomes in green sulfur bacteria. Another example is the complex "pepin" system of Thiomargarita species, especially T. magnifica.

The organelles of the endomembrane system are related through direct contact or by the transfer of membrane segments as vesicles. Despite these relationships, the various membranes are not identical in structure and function. The thickness, molecular composition, and metabolic behavior of a membrane are not fixed, they may be modified several times during the membrane's life. One unifying characteristic the membranes share is a lipid bilayer, with proteins attached to either side or traversing them.

== History of the concept ==
Most lipids are synthesized in yeast either in the endoplasmic reticulum, lipid particles, or the mitochondrion, with little or no lipid synthesis occurring in the cell membrane or nuclear membrane. Sphingolipid biosynthesis begins in the endoplasmic reticulum, but is completed in the Golgi apparatus. The situation is similar in mammals, with the exception of the first few steps in ether lipid biosynthesis, which occur in peroxisomes. The various membranes that enclose the other subcellular organelles must therefore be constructed by transfer of lipids from these sites of synthesis. However, although it is clear that lipid transport is a central process in organelle biogenesis, the mechanisms by which lipids are transported through cells remain poorly understood.

The first proposal that the membranes within cells form a single system that exchanges material between its components was by Morré and Mollenhauer in 1974. This proposal was made as a way of explaining how the various lipid membranes are assembled in the cell, with these membranes being assembled through lipid flow from the sites of lipid synthesis. The idea of lipid flow through a continuous system of membranes and vesicles was an alternative to the various membranes being independent entities that are formed from transport of free lipid components, such as fatty acids and sterols, through the cytosol. Importantly, the transport of lipids through the cytosol and lipid flow through a continuous endomembrane system are not mutually exclusive processes and both may occur in cells.

== Components of the system ==
=== Nuclear envelope ===
Diagram of the nucleus with the nuclear envelope shown as the orange portion

The nuclear envelope surrounds the nucleus, separating its contents from the cytoplasm. It has two membranes, each a lipid bilayer with associated proteins. The outer nuclear membrane is continuous with the rough endoplasmic reticulum membrane, and like that structure, features ribosomes attached to the surface. The outer membrane is also continuous with the inner nuclear membrane since the two layers are fused together at numerous tiny holes called nuclear pores that perforate the nuclear envelope. These pores are about 120 nm in diameter and regulate the passage of molecules between the nucleus and cytoplasm, permitting some to pass through the membrane, but not others. Since the nuclear pores are located in an area of high traffic, they play an important role in cell physiology. The space between the outer and inner membranes is called the perinuclear space and is joined with the lumen of the rough ER.

The nuclear envelope's structure is determined by a network of intermediate filaments (protein filaments). This network is organized into a mesh-like lining called the nuclear lamina, which binds to chromatin, integral membrane proteins, and other nuclear components along the inner surface of the nucleus. The nuclear lamina is thought to help materials inside the nucleus reach the nuclear pores and in the disintegration of the nuclear envelope during mitosis and its reassembly at the end of the process.

The nuclear pores are highly efficient at selectively allowing the passage of materials to and from the nucleus, because the nuclear envelope has a considerable amount of traffic. RNA and ribosomal subunits must be continually transferred from the nucleus to the cytoplasm. Histones, gene regulatory proteins, DNA and RNA polymerases, and other substances essential for nuclear activities must be imported from the cytoplasm. The nuclear envelope of a typical mammalian cell contains 3000–4000 pore complexes. If the cell is synthesizing DNA each pore complex needs to transport about 100 histone molecules per minute. If the cell is growing rapidly, each complex also needs to transport about 6 newly assembled large and small ribosomal subunits per minute from the nucleus to the cytosol, where they are used to synthesize proteins.

=== Endoplasmic reticulum ===
1 Nucleus 2 Nuclear pore 3 Rough endoplasmic reticulum (RER) 4 Smooth endoplasmic reticulum (SER) 5 Ribosome on the rough ER 6 Proteins that are transported 7 Transport vesicle 8 Golgi apparatus 9 Cis face of the Golgi apparatus 10 Trans face of the Golgi apparatus 11 Cisternae of the Golgi apparatus

The endoplasmic reticulum (ER) is a membranous synthesis and transport organelle that is an extension of the nuclear envelope. More than half the total membrane in eukaryotic cells is accounted for by the ER. The ER is made up of flattened sacs and branching tubules that are thought to interconnect, so that the ER membrane forms a continuous sheet enclosing a single internal space. This highly convoluted space is called the ER lumen and is also referred to as the ER cisternal space. The lumen takes up about ten percent of the entire cell volume. The endoplasmic reticulum membrane allows molecules to be selectively transferred between the lumen and the cytoplasm, and since it is connected to the nuclear envelope, it provides a channel between the nucleus and the cytoplasm.

The ER has a central role in producing, processing, and transporting biochemical compounds for use inside and outside of the cell. Its membrane is the site of production of all the transmembrane proteins and lipids for many of the cell's organelles, including the ER itself, the Golgi apparatus, lysosomes, endosomes, secretory vesicles, and the cell membrane. Furthermore, almost all of the proteins that will exit the cell, plus those destined for the lumen of the ER, Golgi apparatus, or lysosomes, are originally delivered to the ER lumen. Consequently, many of the proteins found in the cisternal space of the endoplasmic reticulum lumen are there only temporarily as they pass on their way to other locations. Other proteins, however, constantly remain in the lumen and are known as endoplasmic reticulum resident proteins. These special proteins contain a specialized retention signal made up of a specific sequence of amino acids that enables them to be retained by the organelle. An example of an important endoplasmic reticulum resident protein is the chaperone protein known as BiP which identifies other proteins that have been improperly built or processed and keeps them from being sent to their final destinations.

The ER is involved in cotranslational sorting of proteins. A polypeptide which contains an ER signal sequence is recognised by the signal recognition particle which halts the production of the protein. The SRP transports the nascent protein to the ER membrane where it is released through a membrane channel and translation resumes.

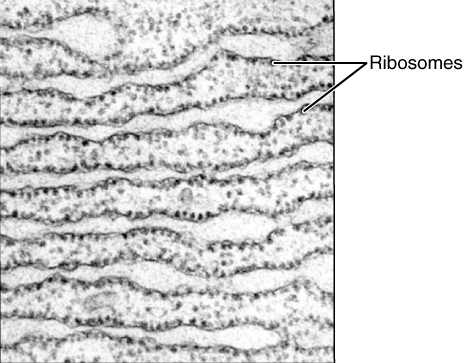
By using electron microscope, ribosomes ("particles") on the rough endoplasmic reticulum can be observed

There are two distinct, though connected, regions of ER that differ in structure and function: smooth ER and rough ER. The rough endoplasmic reticulum is so named because the cytoplasmic surface is covered with ribosomes, giving it a bumpy appearance when viewed through an electron microscope. The smooth ER appears smooth since its cytoplasmic surface lacks ribosomes.

==== Functions of the smooth ER ====
In the great majority of cells, smooth ER regions are scarce and are often partly smooth and partly rough. They are sometimes called transitional ER because they contain ER exit sites from which transport vesicles carrying newly synthesized proteins and lipids bud off for transport to the Golgi apparatus. In certain specialized cells, however, the smooth ER is abundant and has additional functions. The smooth ER of these specialized cells functions in diverse metabolic processes, including synthesis of lipids, metabolism of carbohydrates, and detoxification of drugs and poisons.

Enzymes of the smooth ER are vital to the synthesis of lipids, including oils, phospholipids, and steroids. Sex hormones of vertebrates and the steroid hormones secreted by the adrenal glands are among the steroids produced by the smooth ER in animal cells. The cells that synthesize these hormones are rich in smooth ER.

Liver cells are another example of specialized cells that contain an abundance of smooth ER. These cells provide an example of the role of smooth ER in carbohydrate metabolism. Liver cells store carbohydrates in the form of glycogen. The breakdown of glycogen eventually leads to the release of glucose from the liver cells, which is important in the regulation of sugar concentration in the blood. However, the primary product of glycogen breakdown is glucose-1-phosphate. This is converted to glucose-6-phosphate and then an enzyme of the liver cell's smooth ER removes the phosphate from the glucose, so that it can then leave the cell.

Enzymes of the smooth ER can also help detoxify drugs and poisons. Detoxification usually involves the addition of a hydroxyl group to a drug, making the drug more soluble and thus easier to purge from the body. One extensively studied detoxification reaction is carried out by the cytochrome P450 family of enzymes, which catalyze oxidation reactions on water-insoluble drugs or metabolites that would otherwise accumulate to toxic levels in cell membrane.

In muscle cells, a specialized smooth ER (sarcoplasmic reticulum) forms a membranous compartment (cisternal space) into which calcium ions are pumped. When a muscle cell becomes stimulated by a nerve impulse, calcium goes back across this membrane into the cytosol and generates the contraction of the muscle cell.

==== Functions of the rough ER ====
Many types of cells export proteins produced by ribosomes attached to the rough ER. The ribosomes assemble amino acids into protein units, which are carried into the rough ER for further adjustments. These proteins may be either transmembrane proteins, which become embedded in the membrane of the endoplasmic reticulum, or water-soluble proteins, which are able to pass through the membrane into the lumen. Those that reach the inside of the endoplasmic reticulum are folded into the correct three-dimensional conformation. Chemicals, such as carbohydrates or sugars, are added, then the endoplasmic reticulum either transports the completed proteins, called secretory proteins, to areas of the cell where they are needed, or they are sent to the Golgi apparatus for further processing and modification.

Once secretory proteins are formed, the ER membrane separates them from the proteins that will remain in the cytosol. Secretory proteins depart from the ER enfolded in the membranes of vesicles that bud like bubbles from the transitional ER. These vesicles in transit to another part of the cell are called transport vesicles. An alternative mechanism for transport of lipids and proteins out of the ER are through lipid transfer proteins at regions called membrane contact sites where the ER becomes closely and stably associated with the membranes of other organelles, such as the cell membrane, Golgi or lysosomes.

In addition to making secretory proteins, the rough ER makes membranes that grow in place from the addition of proteins and phospholipids. As polypeptides intended to be membrane proteins grow from the ribosomes, they are inserted into the ER membrane itself and are kept there by their hydrophobic portions. The rough ER also produces its own membrane phospholipids; enzymes built into the ER membrane assemble phospholipids. The ER membrane expands and can be transferred by transport vesicles to other components of the endomembrane system.

=== Golgi apparatus ===
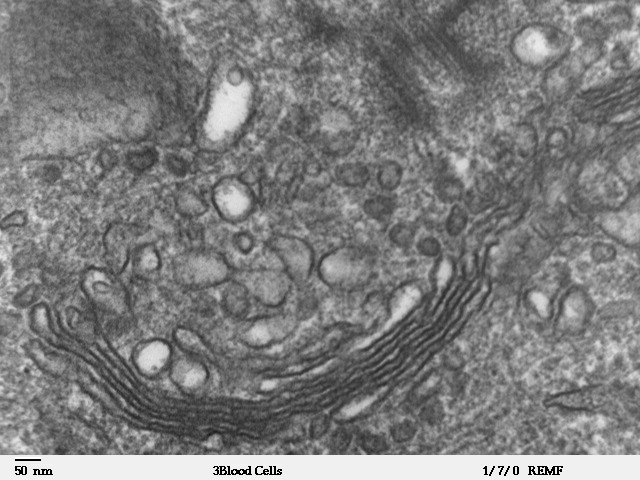
Micrograph of Golgi apparatus, visible as a stack of semicircular black rings near the bottom. Numerous circular vesicles can be seen in proximity to the organelle.

The Golgi apparatus (also known as the Golgi body and the Golgi complex) is composed of separate sacs called cisternae. Its shape is similar to a stack of pancakes. The number of these stacks varies with the specific function of the cell. The Golgi apparatus is used by the cell for further protein modification. The section of the Golgi apparatus that receives the vesicles from the ER is known as the cis face, and is usually near the ER. The opposite end of the Golgi apparatus is called the trans face, this is where the modified compounds leave. The trans face is usually facing the cell membrane, which is where most of the substances the Golgi apparatus modifies are sent.

Vesicles sent off by the ER containing proteins are further altered at the Golgi apparatus and then prepared for secretion from the cell or transport to other parts of the cell. Various things can happen to the proteins on their journey through the enzyme covered space of the Golgi apparatus. The modification and synthesis of the carbohydrate portions of glycoproteins is common in protein processing. The Golgi apparatus removes and substitutes sugar monomers, producing a large variety of oligosaccharides. In addition to modifying proteins, the Golgi also manufactures macromolecules itself. In plant cells, the Golgi produces pectins and other polysaccharides needed by the plant structure.

Once the modification process is completed, the Golgi apparatus sorts the products of its processing and sends them to various parts of the cell. Molecular identification labels or tags are added by the Golgi enzymes to help with this. After everything is organized, the Golgi apparatus sends off its products by budding vesicles from its trans face.

=== Vacuoles ===
Vacuoles, like vesicles, are membrane-bound sacs within the cell. They are larger than vesicles and their specific function varies. The operations of vacuoles are different for plant and animal vacuoles.

In plant cells, vacuoles cover anywhere from 30% to 90% of the total cell volume. Most mature plant cells contain one large central vacuole encompassed by a membrane called the tonoplast. Vacuoles of plant cells act as storage compartments for the nutrients and waste of a cell. The solution that these molecules are stored in is called the cell sap. Pigments that color the cell are sometime located in the cell sap. Vacuoles can also increase the size of the cell, which elongates as water is added, and they control the turgor pressure (the osmotic pressure that keeps the cell wall from caving in). Like lysosomes of animal cells, vacuoles have an acidic pH and contain hydrolytic enzymes. The pH of vacuoles enables them to perform homeostatic procedures in the cell. For example, when the pH in the cells environment drops, the H^{+} ions surging into the cytosol can be transferred to a vacuole in order to keep the cytosol's pH constant.

In animals, vacuoles serve in exocytosis and endocytosis processes. Endocytosis refers to when substances are taken into the cell, whereas for exocytosis substances are moved from the cell into the extracellular space. Material to be taken-in is surrounded by the cell membrane, and then transferred to a vacuole. There are two types of endocytosis, phagocytosis (cell eating) and pinocytosis (cell drinking). In phagocytosis, cells engulf large particles such as bacteria. Pinocytosis is the same process, except the substances being ingested are in the fluid form.

=== Vesicles ===
Vesicles are small membrane-enclosed transport units that can transfer molecules between different compartments. Most vesicles transfer the membranes assembled in the endoplasmic reticulum to the Golgi apparatus, and then from the Golgi apparatus to various locations.

There are various types of vesicles each with a different protein configuration. Most are formed from specific regions of membranes. When a vesicle buds off from a membrane it contains specific proteins on its cytosolic surface. Each membrane a vesicle travels to contains a marker on its cytosolic surface. This marker corresponds with the proteins on the vesicle traveling to the membrane. Once the vesicle finds the membrane, they fuse.

There are three well known types of vesicles. They are clathrin-coated, COPI-coated, and COPII-coated vesicles. Each performs different functions in the cell. For example, clathrin-coated vesicles transport substances between the Golgi apparatus and the plasma membrane. COPI- and COPII-coated vesicles are frequently used for transportation between the ER and the Golgi apparatus.

=== Lysosomes ===
Lysosomes are organelles that contain hydrolytic enzymes that are used for intracellular digestion. The main functions of a lysosome are to process molecules taken in by the cell and to recycle worn out cell parts. The enzymes inside of lysosomes are acid hydrolases which require an acidic environment for optimal performance. Lysosomes provide such an environment by maintaining a pH of 5.0 inside of the organelle. If a lysosome were to rupture, the enzymes released would not be very active because of the cytosol's neutral pH. However, if numerous lysosomes leaked the cell could be destroyed from autodigestion.

Lysosomes carry out intracellular digestion, in a process called phagocytosis (from the Greek phagein, to eat and kytos, vessel, referring here to the cell), by fusing with a vacuole and releasing their enzymes into the vacuole. Through this process, sugars, amino acids, and other monomers pass into the cytosol and become nutrients for the cell. Lysosomes also use their hydrolytic enzymes to recycle the cell's obsolete organelles in a process called autophagy. The lysosome engulfs another organelle and uses its enzymes to take apart the ingested material. The resulting organic monomers are then returned to the cytosol for reuse. The last function of a lysosome is to digest the cell itself through autolysis.

=== Spitzenkörper ===
The spitzenkörper is a component of the endomembrane system found only in fungi, and is associated with hyphal tip growth. It is a phase-dark body that is composed of an aggregation of membrane-bound vesicles containing cell wall components, serving as a point of assemblage and release of such components intermediate between the Golgi and the cell membrane. The spitzenkörper is motile and generates new hyphal tip growth as it moves forward.

Detailed illustration of the cell membrane. Including the structure of a phospholipid.

=== Cell membrane ===
The cell membrane is a phospholipid bilayer membrane that separates the cell from its environment and regulates the transport of molecules and signals into and out of the cell. Embedded in the membrane are proteins that perform the functions of the plasma membrane. The plasma membrane is not a fixed or rigid structure, the molecules that compose the membrane are capable of lateral movement. This movement and the multiple components of the membrane are why it is referred to as a fluid mosaic. Smaller molecules such as carbon dioxide, water, and oxygen can pass through the cell membrane freely by diffusion or osmosis. Larger molecules needed by the cell are assisted by proteins through active transport.

The cell membrane has multiple functions. These include transporting nutrients into the cell, allowing waste to leave, preventing materials from entering the cell, averting needed materials from leaving the cell, maintaining the pH of the cytosol, and preserving the osmotic pressure of the cytosol. Transport proteins which allow some materials to pass through but not others are used for these functions. These proteins use ATP hydrolysis to pump materials against their concentration gradients.

In addition to these universal functions, the cell membrane has a more specific role in multicellular organisms. Glycoproteins on the membrane assist the cell in recognizing other cells, in order to exchange metabolites and form tissues. Other proteins on the plasma membrane allow attachment to the cytoskeleton and extracellular matrix; a function that maintains cell shape and fixes the location of membrane proteins. Enzymes that catalyze reactions are also found on the cell membrane. Receptor proteins on the membrane have a shape that matches with a chemical messenger, resulting in various cellular responses.

== Evolution ==
The origin of the endomembrane system is linked to the origin of eukaryotes themselves and the origin of eukaryoties to the endosymbiotic origin of mitochondria. Many models have been put forward to explain the origin of the endomembrane system (reviewed in). The most recent concept suggests that the endomembrane system evolved from outer membrane vesicles the endosymbiotic mitochondrion secreted, and got enclosed within infoldings of the host prokaryote (in turn, a result of the ingestion of the endosymbiont). This OMV (outer membrane vesicles)-based model for the origin of the endomembrane system is currently the one that requires the fewest novel inventions at eukaryote origin and explains the many connections of mitochondria with other compartments of the cell. Currently, this "inside-out" hypothesis (which states that the alphaproteobacteria, the ancestral mitochondria, were engulfed by the blebs of an asgardarchaeon, and later the blebs fused leaving infoldings which would eventually become the endomembrane system) is favored more than the outside-in one (which suggested that the endomembrane system arose due to infoldings within the archaeal membrane).
