= RhoGAP domain =

Evolutionary conserved protein domain

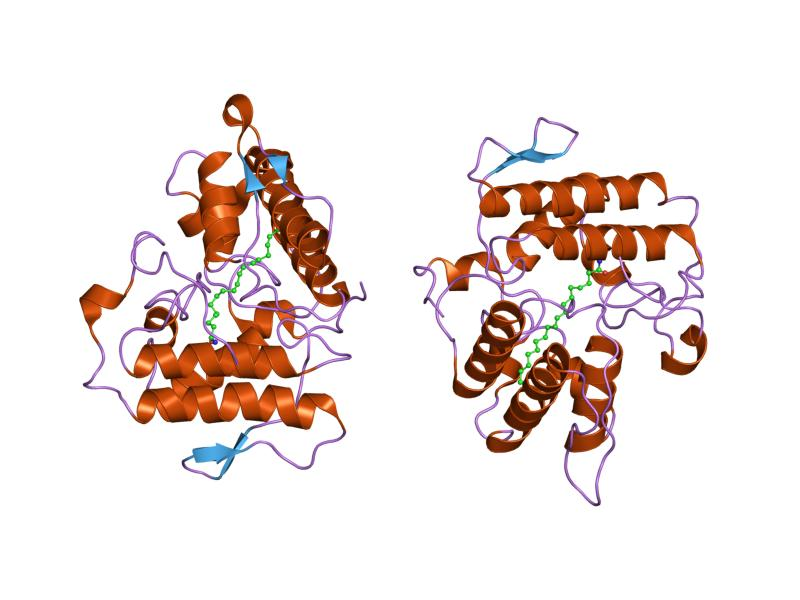
- Structure of Phospholipase A2.

Identifiers
- Symbol: RhoGAP
- Pfam: PF00620
- InterPro: IPR000198
- SMART: RhoGAP
- PROSITE: PDOC50238
- SCOP2: 1rgb / SCOPe / SUPFAM
- OPM protein: 1xa6
- CDD: cd00159
Available protein structures:
- Pfam: structures / ECOD
- PDB: RCSB PDB; PDBe; PDBj
- PDBsum: structure summary
- PDB: 1xa6A:291-444 1f7cA:199-355 1am4B:260-408 1grnB:260-408 1ow3A:260-408 1rgp :260-402 1tx4A:260-408 2ngrB:260-408 1pbwB:129-281

RhoGAP domain is an evolutionary conserved protein domain of GTPase activating proteins towards Rho/Rac/Cdc42-like small GTPases.

== Human proteins containing this domain ==
ABR; ARHGAP1; ARHGAP10; ARHGAP11A; ARHGAP11B; ARHGAP12; ARHGAP15; ARHGAP17; ARHGAP18; ARHGAP19; ARHGAP20; ARHGAP21; ARHGAP22; ARHGAP23; ARHGAP24; ARHGAP25; ARHGAP26; ARHGAP27; ARHGAP28; ARHGAP29; ARHGAP30; ARHGAP4; ARHGAP5; ARHGAP6; ARHGAP8; ARHGAP9; BCR; BPGAP1; C1; C5orf5; CDGAP; CENTD1; CENTD2; CENTD3; CHN1; CHN2; DEPDC1; DEPDC1A; DEPDC1B; DLC1; FAM13A1; FKSG42; GMIP; GRLF1; HMHA1; INPP5B; KIAA1688; LOC553158; MYO9A; MYO9B; OCRL; OPHN1; PIK3R1; PIK3R2; PRR5; RACGAP1; RACGAP1P; RALBP1; RICH2; RICS; SH3BP1; SLIT1; SNX26; SRGAP1; SRGAP2; SRGAP3; STARD13; STARD8; SYDE1; SYDE2;
