= FAM13B =

Human gene and protein

Identifiers
- Aliases: FAM13B, ARHGAP49, C5orf5, FAM13B1, KHCHP, N61, family with sequence similarity 13 member B
- External IDs: OMIM: 609371; MGI: 2447834; GeneCards: FAM13B

Gene location (Human)
Chr.	Chromosome 5 (human)
Band	5q31.2	Start	137,937,960 bp
Band	5q31.2	End	138,051,961 bp

Gene location (Mouse)
Chr.	Chromosome 18 (mouse)
Band	18|18 B1	Start	34,575,404 bp
Band	18|18 B1	End	34,639,884 bp
RNA expression pattern
Bgee	Human / Mouse (ortholog); Top expressed in: Achilles tendon; germinal epithelium; tail of epididymis; palpebral conjunctiva; seminal vesicula; Brodmann area 23; parietal pleura; sural nerve; visceral pleura; endothelial cell / Top expressed in: tail of embryo; substantia nigra; facial motor nucleus; motor neuron; genital tubercle; lateral hypothalamus; paraventricular nucleus of hypothalamus; dorsomedial hypothalamic nucleus; ventral tegmental area; medullary collecting duct; More reference expression data
BioGPS	n/a
Gene ontology
Molecular function	GTPase activator activity
Cellular component	cytosol
Biological process	positive regulation of GTPase activity; regulation of small GTPase mediated signal transduction; signal transduction
Sources:Amigo / QuickGO
Orthologs
Databases	NCBI: entry; OMA: entry
Species	Human	Mouse
Entrez	51306	225358
Ensembl	ENSG00000031003	ENSMUSG00000036501
UniProt	Q9NYF5	Q8K2H3
RefSeq (mRNA)	NM_001101800; NM_001101801; NM_016603	NM_146084
RefSeq (protein)	NP_001095270; NP_001095271; NP_057687	NP_666196
Location (UCSC)	Chr 5: 137.94 – 138.05 Mb	Chr 18: 34.58 – 34.64 Mb
PubMed search
- Wikidata
View/Edit Human	View/Edit Mouse

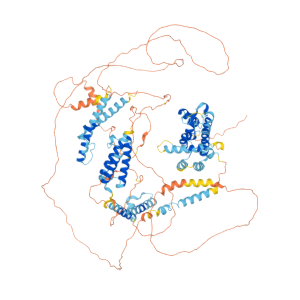
Tertiary Structure of the human FAM13B protein from AlphaFold

Family with sequence similarity 13 member B is a protein which in humans is encoded by the FAM13B gene, also known as C5ORF5. The FAM13B gene is found in vertebrates and jawed fish. FAM13B is expressed ubiquitously in human tissues and has been linked to malignant myelomas susceptibility to atrial fibrillation, a cardiac arrhythmia.

== Molecular Features ==
=== Gene ===
The FAM13B gene is located on human chromosome 5q31, spanning 5610 base pairs and containing 23 exons.

=== mRNA ===
There are 18 transcript variants, the longest mRNA contains 5610 base pairs.

=== Expression ===
The FAM13B gene is expressed at high levels ubiquitously among human cell tissues with some variability, with the highest expression in the brain and the lowest expression in the liver.

=== Protein ===
The longest protein product of FAM13B consists of 915 amino acids with a molecular mass of 105kD. FAM13B variants have the potential to encode several swapped proteins, including proteins with internal deletions, with different C termini, and with a deletion of the N terminus. The protein has an isoelectric point of 4.9. The human FAM13B protein is localized in the nucleoplasm and contains multiple peroxisomal targeting signals and nuclear localization signals. The FAM13B protein has a lower amount of threonine and a higher amount of glutamate compared to other human proteins.

The FAM13B contains 2 disordered region and 2 conserved domains:

- RHO GTPase-activating proteins domain (RhoGAP) - crucial in cell cytoskeletal organization, growth, differentiation, neuronal development and synaptic functions.
- N-terminal homeodomain-like domain of metazoan RecQ protein-like 4 (RecQL4_SLD2_NTD) - involved in various cellular process, including DNA replication, recombination, and repair.

The RHOGAP domain is also found in the orthologs.

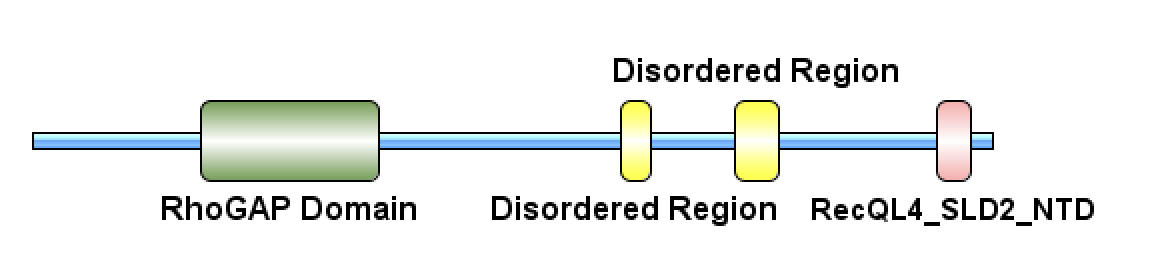
Annotated FAM13B protein, made from The CUCKOO Workgroup

=== Post-translation modifications ===
The human FAM13B protein can undergo post-translational modifications including phosphorylation, acetylation, and methylation.

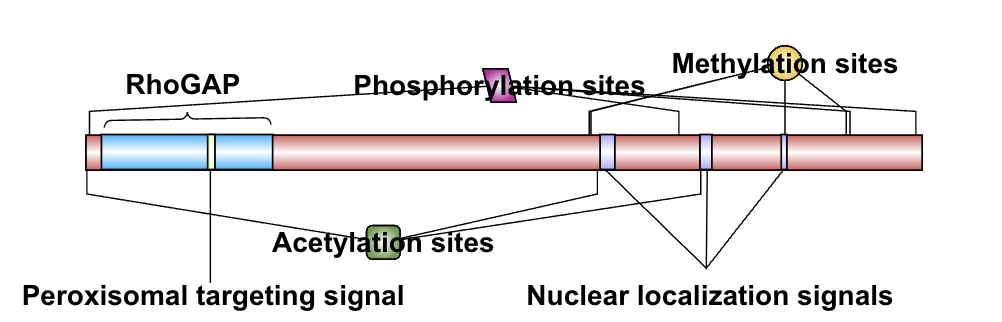
Annotated post-translational modification sites on human FAM13B protein, made from The CUCKOO Workgroup

=== Interacting proteins ===
The human FAM13B protein interacts with several proteins that are localized in the nucleoplasm, including RAC1, NME5, SPATA24, HIGD1A, PPP2CA, SAMHD1, UNK, YWHAZ.

== Evolution ==
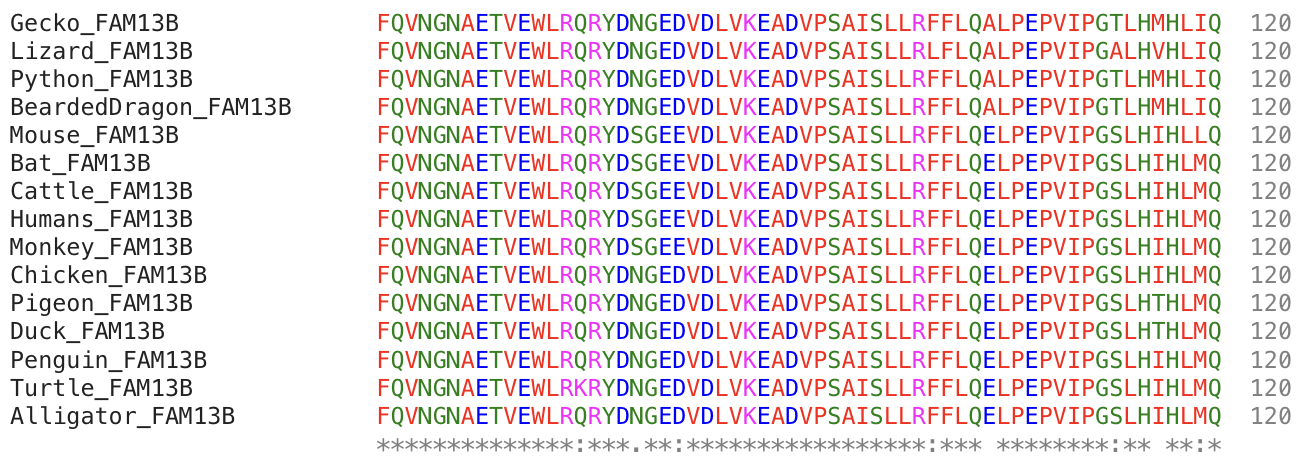
Multiple sequence alignment of a conserved area of the FAM13B protein

=== Orthologs ===
Orthologs of the FAM13B gene can be found in vertebrates including mammals, aves, reptiles, amphibians, and jawed fish. There are no FAM13B orthologs found in invertebrates. FAM13B is more conserved in mammals, aves, and reptiles. FAM13B has a moderate mutation rate that is slower than Fibrinogen Alpha Chain but faster than Cytochrome C.

Table of selected orthologs from all animal groups
Genus and species	Common name	Estimated Divergence (MYA)	Accession number	Amino Acid Length	Sequence Similarity (%)
Homo sapiens	Humans	0	NP_001372850	915	100
Macaca mulatta	Rhesus monkey	28.8	NP_001247877	916	99.2
Mus musculus	House mouse	87	NP_666196	851	87.3
Alligator sinesis	Chinese alligator	319	XP_006026918	930	87.0
Gallus gallus	Chicken	319	NP_001264674	905	85.9
Xenopus tropicalis	Tropical clawed frog	352	XP_002933679	831	72.0
Amblyraja radiata	Thorny skate	462	XP_032885277	825	58.4

=== Paralogs ===
The human FAM13B gene has two paralogs, FAM13A and FAM13C. Similar to FAM13B, the FAM13A and FAM13C are found in vertebrates including mammals, aves, reptiles, amphibians, and jawed fish. The paralogs are not found in invertebrates.

== Clinical significance ==
FAM13B is frequently deleted in malignant myelomas, suggesting its potential role in cancer development. Altered expression of FAM13B has been linked to susceptibility to atrial fibrillation, a cardiac arrhythmia.
