= DEPDC7 =

Protein-coding gene in humans

Identifiers
- Aliases: DEPDC7, TR2, dJ85M6.4, DEP domain containing 7
- External IDs: OMIM: 612294; MGI: 2139258; GeneCards: DEPDC7

Gene location (Human)
Chr.	Chromosome 11 (human)
Band	11p13	Start	33,015,876 bp
Band	11p13	End	33,033,582 bp

Gene location (Mouse)
Chr.	Chromosome 2 (mouse)
Band	2|2 E2	Start	104,552,129 bp
Band	2|2 E2	End	104,573,223 bp
RNA expression pattern
Bgee	Human / Mouse (ortholog); Top expressed in: oocyte; secondary oocyte; jejunal mucosa; right lobe of liver; gonad; mucosa of ileum; duodenum; testicle; left testis; right testis / Top expressed in: primary oocyte; secondary oocyte; zygote; right kidney; yolk sac; left lobe of liver; proximal tubule; morula; ileum; olfactory epithelium; More reference expression data
BioGPS	n/a
Gene ontology
Molecular function	GTPase activator activity; molecular function
Cellular component	cytosol; cellular component
Biological process	intracellular signal transduction; regulation of small GTPase mediated signal transduction; positive regulation of GTPase activity; signal transduction; biological process
Sources:Amigo / QuickGO
Orthologs
Databases	NCBI: entry; OMA: entry
Species	Human	Mouse
Entrez	91614	211896
Ensembl	ENSG00000121690	ENSMUSG00000027173
UniProt	Q96QD5	Q91WS7
RefSeq (mRNA)	NM_139160; NM_001077242	NM_144804
RefSeq (protein)	NP_001070710; NP_631899	NP_659053
Location (UCSC)	Chr 11: 33.02 – 33.03 Mb	Chr 2: 104.55 – 104.57 Mb
PubMed search
- Wikidata
View/Edit Human	View/Edit Mouse

DEP Domain Containing Protein 7 (DEPDC7) is a protein of unknown function located on chromosome 11 bases 33,015,863-33,033,581. The cytogenetic location is 11p13. DEPDC7 has several aliases: DEP Domain Containing 7, DJ85M6.4, Novel 58.3 KDA Protein, Protein TR2/D15, and TR2. The DEPDC7 gene is 17,718 base pairs long and has 8 exons and 9 introns. The gene is capable of making 6 different mRNA transcripts. Two functional domains can be found within this gene's sequence: DEP (Dishevelled, Egl-10, and Pleckstrin) domain and RhoGAP domain.

== Gene ==
Transcription produces 4 alternatively spliced variants and 2 unspliced forms. Isoform 1 is the longest of all the variants containing all 8 exons. It codes for 511 amino acids. Northern blot analysis detected that the DEPDC7 transcript in humans was expressed highly in the liver and moderately expressed in the kidney. Hypomethylation of one of the DEPDC7 introns was related to the appearance of depression symptoms.

== Structure ==
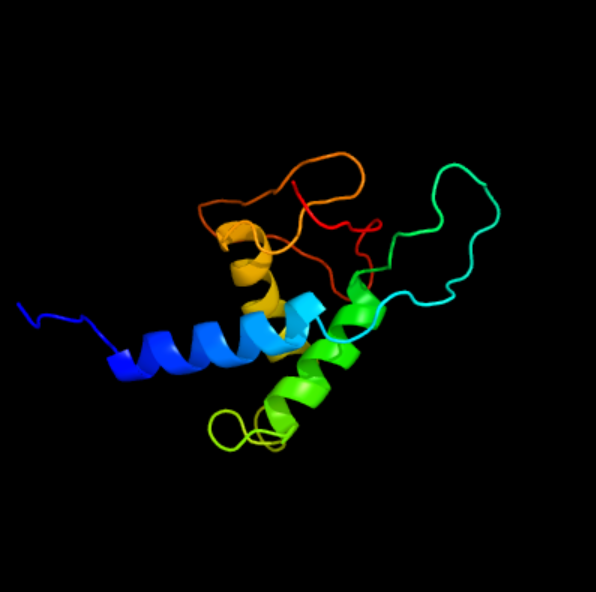
Protein structure

The protein is 511 amino acids long and has a molecular weight of 58310.

DEP domain is named after the 3 proteins it was initially found in: Dishevelled, Egl-10, and Pleckstrin. Dishevelled plays a key role in the transduction of the Wg/Wnt signal. This signal goes from the cell surface to the nucleus. Dishevelled is a segment polarity protein needed to make coherent arrays of polarized cells and segments in embryos. It also plays a role in wingless signaling. Egl-10 regulates G-protein signaling in the central nervous system. Pleckstrin has 2 PH domains flanking the DEP domain and is the major substrate of protein kinase C in platelets. The DEP domain within DEPDC7 was found to bind with CARMA2 and CARMA3 proteins.

== Clinical significance ==
DEPDC7 could have a role in tumor suppression. Overexpression inhibits the proliferation of hepatoma cells blocks the cell cycle transition from the G0/G1 to S phase, and inhibits the migration and invasion of hematoma cells. DEPDC7 could potentially regulate neural development and physiology and could participate in epigenetic processes of striatal neurons. Genomic rearrangement within 11p12 and 11p14 were associated with WAGR syndrome.

== Paralogs ==
DEPDC7 has a paralog: DEPDC1B, a protein coding gene.
