= DEPDC1B =

Protein-coding gene in the species Homo sapiens

Identifiers
- Aliases: DEPDC1B, BRCC3, XTP1, DEP domain containing 1B
- External IDs: OMIM: 616073; MGI: 2145425; GeneCards: DEPDC1B

Gene location (Human)
Chr.	Chromosome 5 (human)
Band	5q12.1	Start	60,596,912 bp
Band	5q12.1	End	60,700,190 bp

Gene location (Mouse)
Chr.	Chromosome 13 (mouse)
Band	13|13 D2.1	Start	108,452,866 bp
Band	13|13 D2.1	End	108,544,316 bp
RNA expression pattern
Bgee	Human / Mouse (ortholog); Top expressed in: secondary oocyte; ventricular zone; gallbladder; ganglionic eminence; gonad; placenta; thymus; testicle; bone marrow; bone marrow cell / Top expressed in: hand; granulocyte; right kidney; medial ganglionic eminence; maxillary prominence; primitive streak; mandibular prominence; spermatocyte; endocardial cushion; epiblast; More reference expression data
BioGPS	n/a
Gene ontology
Molecular function	GTPase activator activity
Cellular component	cytosol
Biological process	positive regulation of Wnt signaling pathway; positive regulation of GTPase activity; intracellular signal transduction; regulation of small GTPase mediated signal transduction; cell migration; signal transduction
Sources:Amigo / QuickGO
Orthologs
Databases	NCBI: entry; OMA: entry
Species	Human	Mouse
Entrez	55789	218581
Ensembl	ENSG00000035499	ENSMUSG00000021697
UniProt	Q8WUY9	Q8BH88
RefSeq (mRNA)	NM_001145208; NM_018369	NM_178683
RefSeq (protein)	NP_001138680; NP_060839	NP_848798
Location (UCSC)	Chr 5: 60.6 – 60.7 Mb	Chr 13: 108.45 – 108.54 Mb
PubMed search
- Wikidata
View/Edit Human	View/Edit Mouse

DEP Domain Containing Protein 1B also known as XTP1, XTP8, HBV XAg-Transactivated Protein 8, formerly referred to as BRCC3 is a human protein encoded by a gene of similar name located on chromosome 5.

The precise function of DEPDC1B is currently unknown. Expression profiles indicate that DEPDC1B is highly expressed ubiquitously throughout human tissue.

== Gene structure ==
=== Gene neighborhood ===
DEPDC1B gene locus

DEPDC1B is found on the long arm of chromosome 5 (5q12.1), spanning 103kb on the minus strand. The gene neighborhood of DEPDC1B includes 5 other genes. Downstream are two genes SEPT21 and PDE4D. Upstream are another two genes ELOV7 and KRT8P31. On the complement strand is another gene in the same region PART1.

=== Promoter ===
DEPDC1B promoter region contains several transcription factors associated with proteins of ubiquitous expression. These transcription factors possess a central theme of cellular proliferation, cell cycle regulation, apoptosis, and differentiation. Few promoters unique to tumor suppression or tumorgenesis exist within the region as well.

The following includes the top twenty Predicted Transcription Factors:

1. CREB cAMP-responsive element binding proteins
2. NRF1 nuclear respiratory factor 1
3. CCAAT-enhancer-binding proteins factor
4. KRAB domain zinc finger protein 57
5. Interferon Regulatory Factors
6. Vertebrate caudal related homeodomain protein
7. C2H2 Zinc Finger Transcription Factors 1
8. Human and Murine ETS1 factors
9. Selenocysteine tRNA activating factor
10. GC-Box factors SP1/GC
11. C2H2 Zinc Finger Transcription Factors 2
12. PREB core-binding element
13. Activator-, mediator- and TBP-dependent core promoter element for RNA polymerase II transcription from TATA-less promoters
14. Cell cycle regulators: Cell cycle homology element
15. Core promoter motif ten elements
16. Human muscle-specific Mt binding site
17. PAX-2/5/8 binding sites
18. RNA polymerase II transcription factor II B
19. Cellular and viral myb-like transcriptional regulators
20. Abdominal-B type homeodomain transcription factors

== mRNA structure ==
=== Splice variants ===
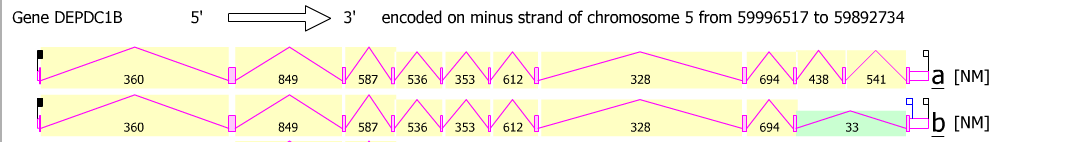
The two confirmed DEPDC1B mRNA splice variants

DEPDC1B possesses 13 mRNA splice variants that form two isoforms. Isoform 1 is the longest and is the most commonly used version of the gene. It is composed of 11 exons and is 103254bp in length. Isoform 2 is the second confirmed transcript variant. It is composed of 10 exons, missing the tenth exon of the first variant. The missing exon is 186bp in length. See Protein Structure section for more detail...

=== Secondary structure ===
DEPDC1B is predicted to be predominantly alpha-helical. No significant beta-strands or beta structures exist with the protein. .

=== Stem loops and binding miRNA ===
DEPDC1B is predicted to possess multiple stem loops in its 5' and 3' untranslated regions (UTR) . In the 3' UTR, miRNA has-miR-499-5p binds to a nucleotide region predicted as a stem loop.

== Protein structure ==
=== Sequence ===
The DEPDC1B gene possesses two novel proteoforms. The longest variation, coded by mRNA isoform 1, is the most commonly used. The protein is 529 amino acids in length. The second novel proteoform, DEPDC1B.2 is coded by 10 exons, missing the 10th exon from the longest variation. The protein is 467 amino acids in length. The missing 62 amino acids follow the RhoGAP domain, in a region predicted to be highly phosphorylated

=== Domains ===
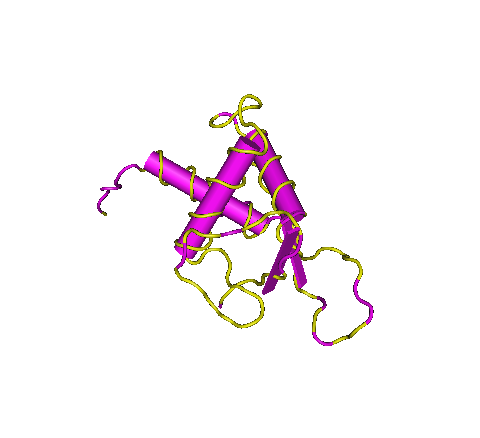
Solution structure for the human DEP domain

DEPDC1B contains two structural domains: a DEP domain and a RhoGAP domain.

The DEP domain is primarily found in proteins involved in G-protein signalling pathways and regulation of GTPase. As well, experimental evidence suggests that the DEP domain determines the subcellular target of some GTPase Activating proteins. In the DEPDC1B protein electronic inference has verified the GTPase activator activity function. The solution structure of human containing DEP domain containing proteins verifies the secondary structure of the domain: containing three alpha-helices and two beta-strands within the approximate 80 amino acid region of the domain.

The RhoGAP domain is another structural domain known to interact with GTPase and small GTPase. Research concerning the domain in other proteins indicates an approximately similar function among the domain in various proteins. The domain has been verified to interact with other proteins to form complexes or interact with other structures of the cell such as the cytoskeleton or plasma membrane.

=== Post-translational modification ===
DEPDC1B protein product is predicted to be highly phosphorylated after translation. A single sumoylation site, found within the RhoGAP domain, indicates the possible interaction of the protein with a SUMO protein, enabling or inhibiting interaction with other proteins. A single palmitoylation site, found within the RhoGAP domain, indicates the possible interaction of the DEPDC1B protein product with a membrane via lipid anchor.

No conserved glycosylation sites are predicted within the mature DEPDC1B protein product. No signal peptide or transmembrane domains are predicted within human or any ortholog protein. No prenylation sites are predicted in any DEPDC1B orthologs.

=== Expression ===
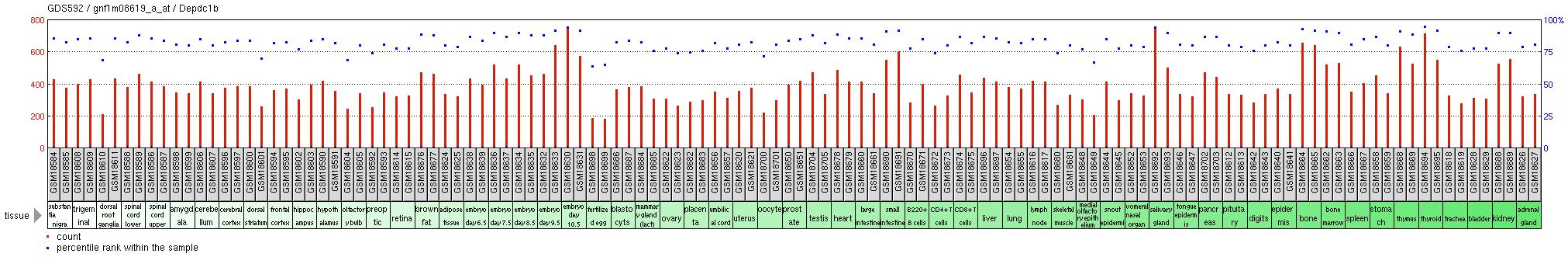
Mouse DEPDC1B large-scale tissue expression

Expression of DEPDC1B is reported to be largely ubiquitous throughout mouse tissue. High level of gene expression is observed in all periods of life, except early zygote stages. Experimental evidence suggests that DEPDC1B presents similar ubiquitous expression in all tissues.

Differential expression profiles suggest that DEPDC1B is higher expressed in many cancerous disease states, including: papillary thyroid cancer, breast cancer, synovial sarcoma, and prostatic cancer progression. Also, DEPDC1B expression decreases in environments of beta-catenin depletion in multiple myeloma cell lines

=== Interactions ===
No interactions of DEPDC1B within any other protein product characterized by experimentation have been verified.

Medium coexpression of DEPDC1B with ECT2 in cell cycle regulation and DNA synthesis was verified by similarity of expression in various tissues. The remaining predicted interaction were determined via datamining.

== Homology ==
=== Orthologs ===
DEPDC1B is unique to Chordates in Kingdom Animalia

Multiple sequence alignments verify that DEPDC1B is highly conserved among orthologs. The two structural domains (DEP and RhoGAP) are the two most conserved elements of the proteins. Various motifs are also conserved throughout the protein. No data suggesting motif function could be determined. All predicted post-translational modification were confirmed to be conserved in the orthologous proteins.

DEPDC1B evolution is predicted to follow the general species evolution.

DEPDC1B Orthologs
Genus and species	Common name	Class	Divergence (mya)	Accession	Percent Identity
Nomascus leucogenys	Northern white-cheeked gibbon	Mammalia	20.4	XP_003266016	98%
Papio anubis	Olive baboon	Mammalia	29	XP_003899752	98%
Mus musculus	House mouse	Mammalia	92.3	NP_848798	94%
Pteropus alecto	Black flying fox	Mammalia	94.2	XP_006906108	96%
Felis catus	Domestic cat	Mammalia	94.2	XP_003981045	96%
Bos taurus	Cow	Mammalia	94.2	XP_005221558	95%
Monodelphis domestica	Gray short-tailed opossum	Mammalia	162.6	XP_001363879	88%
Ficedula albicollis	Collared flycatcher	Ave	296	XP_005060715	77%
Taeniopygia guttata	Zebra finch	Ave	296	XP_002188294	76%
Gallus gallus	Chicken	Ave	296	NP_001006576	75%
Anolis carolinensis	Green anole	Reptilia	296	XP_003216290	76%
Xenopus tropicalis	Western clawed frog	Amphibia	371.2	NP_001121488	68%
Lepisosteus oculatus	Spotted gar	Actinopterygii	400.1	XP_006626875	68%
Maylandia zebra	Zebra mbuna	Actinopterygii	400.1	XP_004566850	57%

=== Paralogs ===
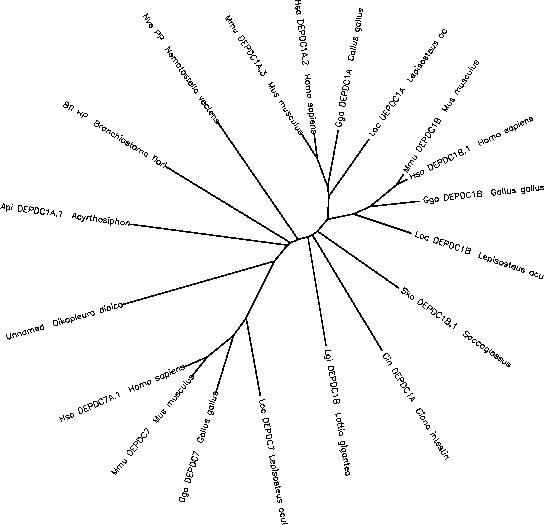
Evolutionary relationship of DEPDC1B to paralogs - DEPDC1A and DEPDC7

DEPDC1B possesses two significant paralogs - DEPDC1A and DEPDC7

Multiple sequence alignment and phylogenetic analysis indicates DEPDC1A as the most recent paralog, diverging approximately 600 million years ago. DEPDC1A has been researched in several disease states. High expression of the protein in Multiple Myeloma (MM) malignant plasma cells is associated with patient fatality. The high expression has been confirmed using conditional lentiviral vector delivery "to inhibit growth of human melanoma cell lines (HMCLs), with a block in G2 phase of the cell cycle, p53 phosphorylation and stabilization, and p21Cip1 accumulation"9. In the same study it was concluded that DEPDC1A may contribute to the plasmablast features of MM cells, blocking differentiation. Study of DEPDC1A in bladder carcinogenesis revealed the gene as a possible antigen for the formation of bladder cancer cells. Using microarray and northern blotting confirmed the presence of unsubstantial amounts of the protein within the normal tissues, excluding the testis. Currently the gene is a potential target molecule for therapeutic treatment of bladder carcinogenesis.

No data detailing significant function in DEPD7 has been published or recorded.
