= ARHGAP11B =

Protein-coding gene in the species Homo sapiens

Identifiers
- Aliases: ARHGAP11B, B'-T, FAM7B1, Rho GTPase activating protein 11B, GAP (1-8), ArhGAP11B and human encephalisation
- External IDs: OMIM: 616310; GeneCards: ARHGAP11B

Gene location (Human)
Chr.	Chromosome 15 (human)
Band	15q13.2	Start	30,624,494 bp
Band	15q13.2	End	30,649,529 bp
RNA expression pattern
Bgee	Human / Mouse (ortholog); Top expressed in: testicle; bone marrow; bone marrow cell; ganglionic eminence; stromal cell of endometrium; ventricular zone; gonad; lymph node; monocyte; appendix / n/a; More reference expression data
BioGPS	n/a
Gene ontology
Molecular function	GTPase activator activity
Cellular component	cytosol
Biological process	regulation of small GTPase mediated signal transduction; signal transduction; cerebral cortex development; positive regulation of GTPase activity
Sources:Amigo / QuickGO
Orthologs
Databases	NCBI: entry; OMA: entry
Species	Human	Mouse
Entrez	89839	n/a
Ensembl	ENSG00000274734; ENSG00000286139; ENSG00000285077	n/a
UniProt	Q3KRB8	n/a
RefSeq (mRNA)	NM_001039841	n/a
RefSeq (protein)	NP_001034930	n/a
Location (UCSC)	Chr 15: 30.62 – 30.65 Mb	n/a
PubMed search		n/a
- Wikidata
View/Edit Human

ARHGAP11B is a human-specific gene that amplifies basal progenitors, controls neural progenitor proliferation, and contributes to neocortex folding. It is capable of causing neocortex folding in mice. This likely reflects a role for ARHGAP11B in development and evolutionary expansion of the human neocortex, a conclusion consistent with the finding that the gene duplication that created ARHGAP11B occurred on the human lineage after the divergence from the chimpanzee lineage but before the divergence from Neanderthals.

== Structure ==
ARHGAP11B encodes 267 amino acids. A truncated copy of ARHGAP11A, which is found throughout the animal kingdom and encodes a Rho GTPase-activating-protein (RhoGAP domain), ARHGAP11B comprises most of the GAP domain (until lysine-220), followed by a novel C-terminal sequence that lacks the 756 C-terminal amino acids of ARHGAP11A.

== Activity ==
In contrast to full-length ARHGAP11A and ARHGAP11A 1-250, ARHGAP11B, like ARHGAP11A1-220, did not exhibit RhoGAP activity in a RhoA/Rho-kinase–based cell transfection assay. This indicates that the C-terminal 47 amino-acids of ARHGAP11B (after lysine-220) constitute not only a unique sequence, resulting from a frameshifting deletion, but also are functionally distinct from their counterpart in ARHGAP11A. In this assay, co-expression of ARHGAP11B along with ARHGAP11A did not inhibit the latter's RhoGAP activity.

== Function ==
ARHGAP11B is involved in neocortex folding; however, its precise function remains unknown. Several genes involved in intellectual disability encode proteins with RhoGAP domains or other proteins in the Rho signalling pathway. It has been reported that it is located in mitochondria, where it binds to the adenine nucleotide translocator. It does not affect the adenine nucleotide exchange activity of the translocator, but it does lead to delayed opening of the mitochondrial permeability transition pore, thus allowing for greater sequestration of calcium. Furthermore, the presence of ARHGAP11B in the mitochondria boosts glutaminolysis, most likely due to the ability of mitochondria to sequester calcium, thereby activating mitochondrial matrix dehydrogenases in the citric acid cycle, particularly the oxoglutarate dehydrogenase complex.

== Human evolution ==
Changes in ARHGAP11B are one of several key genetic factors of recent brain evolution and difference of modern humans to (other) apes and Neanderthals. A 2016 study suggests, one mutation, a "single nucleotide substitution underlies the specific properties of ARHGAP11B that likely contributed to the evolutionary expansion of the human neocortex".

A 2020 study found that when ARHGAP11B was introduced into the primate common marmoset, it increased radial glial cells, upper layer neurons, and brain wrinkles (gyral and sulcus structures), leading to the expansion of the neocortex. This revealed that ARHGAP11B is the gene responsible for the development of the neocortex during human evolution.
