= STARD8 =

Protein-coding gene in the species Homo sapiens

Identifiers
- Aliases: STARD8, ARHGAP38, DLC3, STARTGAP3, StAR related lipid transfer domain containing 8
- External IDs: OMIM: 300689; MGI: 2448556; GeneCards: STARD8

Gene location (Human)
Chr.	X chromosome (human)
Band	Xq13.1	Start	68,647,666 bp
Band	Xq13.1	End	68,725,842 bp

Gene location (Mouse)
Chr.	X chromosome (mouse)
Band	X|X C3	Start	98,046,854 bp
Band	X|X C3	End	98,118,334 bp
RNA expression pattern
Bgee	Human / Mouse (ortholog); Top expressed in: right lung; upper lobe of left lung; apex of heart; olfactory bulb; human kidney; testicle; left ventricle; right lobe of thyroid gland; left uterine tube; left lobe of thyroid gland / Top expressed in: stroma of bone marrow; yolk sac; right lung lobe; sciatic nerve; left lung; extraocular muscle; dermis; left lung lobe; myocardium of ventricle; human kidney; More reference expression data
BioGPS	n/a
Gene ontology
Molecular function	lipid binding; GTPase activator activity
Cellular component	cytosol; cell junction; focal adhesion
Biological process	positive regulation of GTPase activity; regulation of small GTPase mediated signal transduction; signal transduction
Sources:Amigo / QuickGO
Orthologs
Databases	NCBI: entry; OMA: entry
Species	Human	Mouse
Entrez	9754	236920
Ensembl	ENSG00000130052	ENSMUSG00000031216
UniProt	Q92502	Q8K031
RefSeq (mRNA)	NM_001142503; NM_001142504; NM_014725	NM_199018
RefSeq (protein)	NP_001135975; NP_001135976; NP_055540	NP_950183
Location (UCSC)	Chr X: 68.65 – 68.73 Mb	Chr X: 98.05 – 98.12 Mb
PubMed search
- Wikidata
View/Edit Human	View/Edit Mouse

StAR-related lipid transfer domain protein 8 (STARD8) also known as deleted in liver cancer 3 protein (DLC-3) is a protein that in humans is encoded by the STARD8 gene and is a member of the DLC family.

== Structure and function ==
The protein is 1103 amino acids long, which like other DLC proteins consists of a sterile alpha motif (SAM), RhoGAP and a StAR-related lipid-transfer (START) domains.

The protein is a Rho GTPase-activating protein (GAP), a type of protein that regulates members of the Rho family of GTPases. STARD8 is characterized as activating Rho GTPases. Its expression inhibits the growth of human breast and prostate cancer cells in culture.

== Tissue distribution and pathology ==
The protein is expressed in tissues throughout the body, but is absent or reduced in many kinds of tumor cells.

While there are no known disorders caused by STARD8, partial loss of the STARD8 gene occurs in cases of craniofrontonasal syndrome where the EFNB1 gene (which causes the syndrome) is completely deleted.
