= Pleckstrin =

Protein family

Pleckstrin-1
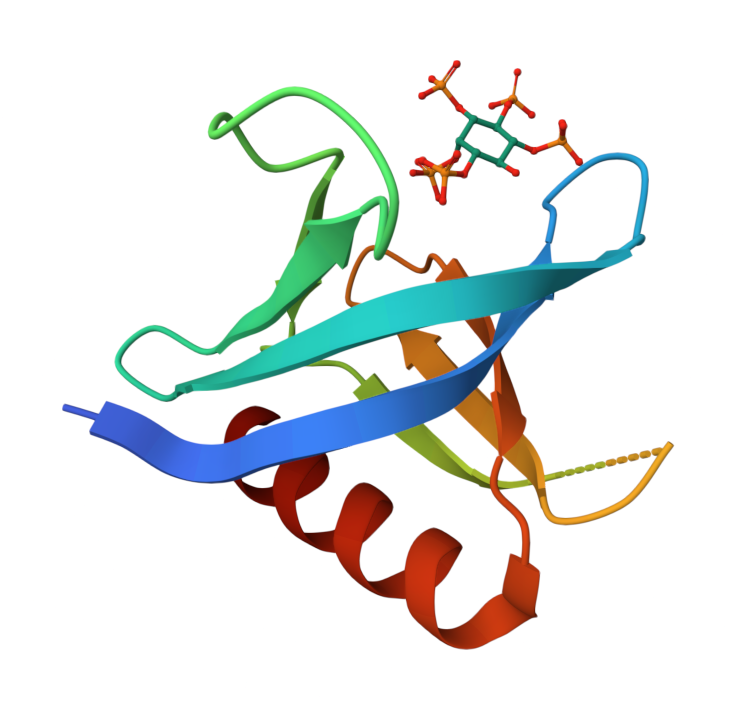
- Ribbon diagram of the C-terminal pleckstrin homology domain of pleckstrin-1 bound to inositol 1,2,3,4,5-pentaphosphate (PDB ID 2I5C)

Identifiers
- Symbol: PLEK
- NCBI gene: 5341
- HGNC: 9070
- OMIM: 173570
- RefSeq: NM_002664
- UniProt: P08567

Other data
- Locus: Chr. 2 p13.3
Search for
- Structures: Swiss-model
- Domains: InterPro

Pleckstrin-2

Identifiers
- Symbol: PLEK2
- NCBI gene: 26499
- HGNC: 19238
- OMIM: 608007
- PDB: 1X1G
- RefSeq: NM_016445
- UniProt: Q9NYT0

Other data
- Locus: Chr. 14 q23.3q24.1
- Wikidata: Q18038260
Search for
- Structures: Swiss-model
- Domains: InterPro

Pleckstrins are a family of proteins found in platelets and other cells. The name derives from platelet and leukocyte C kinase substrate and the KSTR string of amino acids. The prototype protein, now called pleckstrin-1, was first identified in 1979 as the major substrate of protein kinase C in platelets. The homolog pleckstrin-2 is more widely expressed in tissues.

The pleckstrin homology domain (PH domain) was named after pleckstrin-1.

== Sequence and structure ==
Both pleckstrin-1 and pleckstrin-2 contain two pleckstrin homology domains, separated by a central dishevelled-Egl10-pleckstrin (DEP) domain. Pleckstrin-1 is phosphorylated by protein kinase C on three serine and threonine residues located between the first pleckstrin homology domain and the DEP domain; pleckstrin-2 is not a substrate for protein kinase C. The two proteins share 65% sequence homology and have a size of about 47 kilodaltons.

As of 2024, no high-resolution three-dimensional structure has been solved for full-length pleckstrin, but the structures of the individual domains of both pleckstrin-1 and -2 have been published.

== Functions ==
Pleckstrins are involved in rearranging the actin cytoskeleton in such processes as platelet activation, erythropoeisis, and cell spreading by extension of filopodia and lamellipodia. Pleckstrin-1 is believed to become activated by protein kinase C phosphorylation, which results in binding of the membrane lipid phosphatidylinositol 3,4-bisphosphate. Interactions with integrins and the Rac GTPase then lead to reorganization of the actin cytoskeleton. Pleckstrin-2 also binds to inositol phospholipids, but interacts directly with F-actin, unlike pleckstrin-1. Since pleckstrin-2 is expressed in a wider variety of cell types, its biological roles are more diverse than those of pleckstrin-1.

Pleckstrin-1 is a key protein in the membrane remodelling processes that occur during platelet activation. It also occurs in immune cells such as macrophages and neutrophils, where it is involved in formation of phagosomes and the secretion of proinflammatory cytokines.

Pleckstrin-2 has roles in cell spreading, inflammation, erythropoeisis, and tumorigenesis. In lymphocytes, it is involved in PI3 kinase-mediated immune synapse formation. Pleckstrin-2 also mediates cytoskeletal changes involved in proliferation of erythroblasts early in erythropoeisis. It is also believed to be crucial in the epithelial-to-mesenchymal transition in tumor metastasis, and pleckstrin-2 is known to be overexpressed in a variety of cancers.
