= FGF13 =

Protein-coding gene in the species Homo sapiens

Identifiers
- Aliases: FGF13, FGF-13, FGF2, FHF-2, FHF2, fibroblast growth factor 13
- External IDs: OMIM: 300070; MGI: 109178; GeneCards: FGF13
Available structures
PDB	Ortholog search: PDBe RCSB
PDB	List of PDB id codes 3HBW, 4DCK, 4JPZ

Gene location (Human)
Chr.	X chromosome (human)
Band	Xq26.3-q27.1	Start	138,614,727 bp
Band	Xq26.3-q27.1	End	139,222,777 bp

Gene location (Mouse)
Chr.	X chromosome (mouse)
Band	X A6|X 33.31 cM	Start	58,107,505 bp
Band	X A6|X 33.31 cM	End	58,613,431 bp
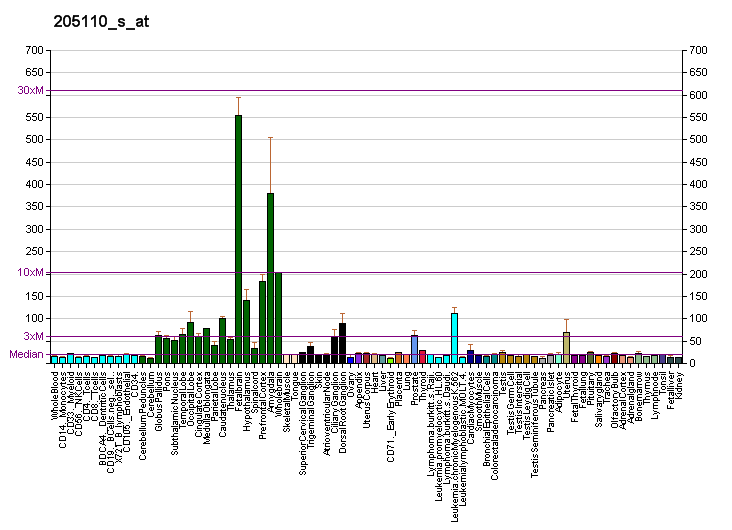
RNA expression pattern
Bgee	Human / Mouse (ortholog); Top expressed in: endothelial cell; spinal ganglia; Region I of hippocampus proper; pars reticulata; orbitofrontal cortex; trigeminal ganglion; middle temporal gyrus; Brodmann area 46; postcentral gyrus; superior frontal gyrus / Top expressed in: ventral tegmental area; substantia nigra; subiculum; medial geniculate nucleus; medial dorsal nucleus; dentate gyrus of hippocampal formation granule cell; prefrontal cortex; anterior amygdaloid area; habenula; lateral geniculate nucleus; More reference expression data
BioGPS	More reference expression data
Gene ontology
Molecular function	protein kinase activator activity; protein binding; growth factor activity; microtubule binding; sodium channel regulator activity; transmembrane transporter binding; beta-tubulin binding
Cellular component	cell projection; filopodium; growth cone; extracellular region; dendrite; nucleolus; microtubule; nucleus; cytoplasm; cytosol; plasma membrane; intercalated disc; lateral plasma membrane; axon; neuron projection
Biological process	cell-cell signaling; nervous system development; MAPK cascade; signal transduction; neuron migration; activation of protein kinase activity; establishment of neuroblast polarity; negative regulation of collateral sprouting; sodium ion transport; negative regulation of microtubule depolymerization; learning; memory; hippocampus development; cerebral cortex cell migration; microtubule polymerization; protein localization to plasma membrane; regulation of cardiac muscle cell action potential involved in regulation of contraction; response to odorant; regulation of signaling receptor activity
Sources:Amigo / QuickGO
Orthologs
Databases	NCBI: entry; OMA: entry
Species	Human	Mouse
Entrez	2258	14168
Ensembl	ENSG00000129682	ENSMUSG00000031137
UniProt	Q92913	P70377
RefSeq (mRNA)	NM_001139498; NM_001139500; NM_001139501; NM_001139502; NM_004114 NM_033642	NM_001290414; NM_001290415; NM_010200; NM_001356335
RefSeq (protein)	NP_001132970; NP_001132972; NP_001132973; NP_001132974; NP_004105 NP_378668	NP_001277343; NP_001277344; NP_034330; NP_001343264
Location (UCSC)	Chr X: 138.61 – 139.22 Mb	Chr X: 58.11 – 58.61 Mb
PubMed search
- Wikidata
View/Edit Human	View/Edit Mouse

Fibroblast growth factor 13 is a protein that in humans is encoded by the FGF13 gene.

The protein encoded by this gene is a member of the fibroblast growth factor (FGF) family. FGF family members possess broad mitogenic and cell survival activities, and are involved in a variety of biological processes, including embryonic development, cell growth, morphogenesis, tissue repair, tumor growth, invasion, and neuronal physiology. This gene is located to a region associated with Börjeson-Forssman-Lehmann syndrome (BFLS), a syndromal X-linked intellectual disability, which suggests it may be a candidate gene for familial cases of the BFL syndrome. The function of this gene has not yet been determined. Several alternatively spliced transcripts encoding different isoforms have been described for this gene. FGF13 isoform 1 (FGF13A) binds to the leucine-rich repeats of the hominid-specific receptor LRRC37B. In human pyramidal neurons of the cerebral cortex, this interaction leads to a lower excitability, a divergent cellular property of human pyramidal neurons compared to other mammals.
