= LRRC37A =

Non-coding RNA in the species Homo sapiens

Identifiers
- Aliases: LRRC37A, LRRC37, leucine rich repeat containing 37A
- External IDs: OMIM: 616555; GeneCards: LRRC37A

Gene location (Human)
Chr.	Chromosome 17 (human)
Band	17q21.31	Start	46,292,733 bp
Band	17q21.31	End	46,337,794 bp
RNA expression pattern
Bgee	Human / Mouse (ortholog); Top expressed in: bone marrow cell; right uterine tube; testicle; gonad; granulocyte; left testis; skeletal muscle tissue; right testis; blood; Achilles tendon / n/a; More reference expression data
BioGPS	n/a
Orthologs
Databases	NCBI: entry; OMA: entry
Species	Human	Mouse
Entrez	9884	n/a
Ensembl	ENSG00000278742; ENSG00000176681	n/a
UniProt	A6NMS7	n/a
RefSeq (mRNA)	NM_014834	n/a
RefSeq (protein)	NP_055649	n/a
Location (UCSC)	Chr 17: 46.29 – 46.34 Mb	n/a
PubMed search		n/a
- Wikidata
View/Edit Human

Leucine rich repeat containing 37A is a protein in humans that is encoded by the LRRC37A gene.

== Evolution ==
The LRRC37 gene family has been expanded in the genome of the simians through segmental duplications leading to new genes in simian, hominid and human species. Most of these new genes belong to the ancestral LRRC37A-type. The human genomes contains at least 4 encoding gene paralogs with 3 of the ancestral type: LRRC37A, LRRC37A2, LRRC37A3 and a new type of receptor shared between hominid species: LRRC37B.

== Function ==
In the human cerebral cortex, LRRC37B is selectively expressed in pyramidal neurons at the level of the axon initial segment, which is not found in other nonhuman primate species (chimpanzees, macaques). It decreases there the excitability of the neurons, a feature specific to the human species compared to other mammalian species. It acts by binding to secreted FGF13A and SCN1B which leads to an inhibition of the voltage-gate sodium channels which generate the action potentials.
