= ARAP3 =

Protein-coding gene in the species Homo sapiens

Identifiers
- Aliases: ARAP3, CENTD3, DRAG1, ArfGAP with RhoGAP domain, ankyrin repeat and PH domain 3
- External IDs: OMIM: 606647; MGI: 2147274; GeneCards: ARAP3
Available structures
| PDB | Ortholog search: PDBe RCSB |
| PDB | List of PDB id codes 2KG5, 2LNW, 5JD0, 5JCP |

Gene location (Human)
| Chr. | Chromosome 5 (human) |
| Band | 5q31.3 | Start | 141,653,401 bp |
| Band | 5q31.3 | End | 141,682,230 bp |

Gene location (Mouse)
| Chr. | Chromosome 18 (mouse) |
| Band | 18|18 B3 | Start | 38,105,681 bp |
| Band | 18|18 B3 | End | 38,132,022 bp |
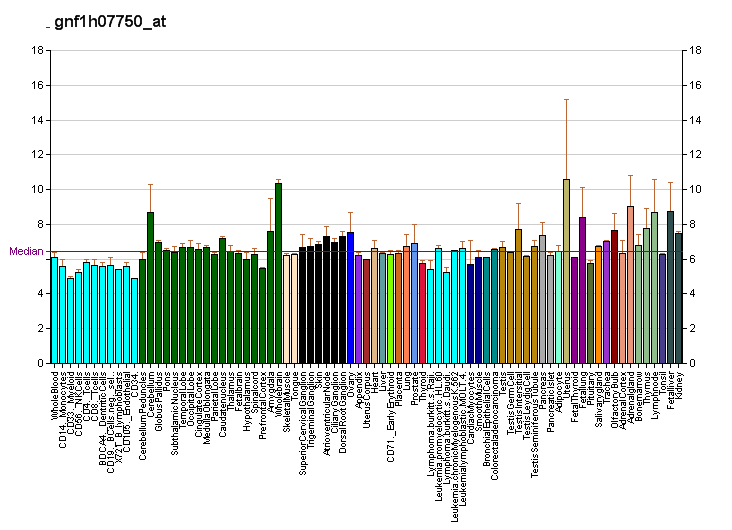

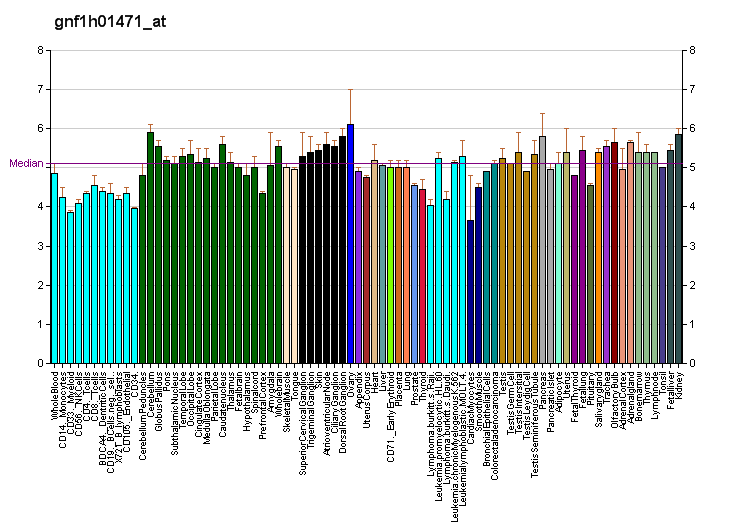

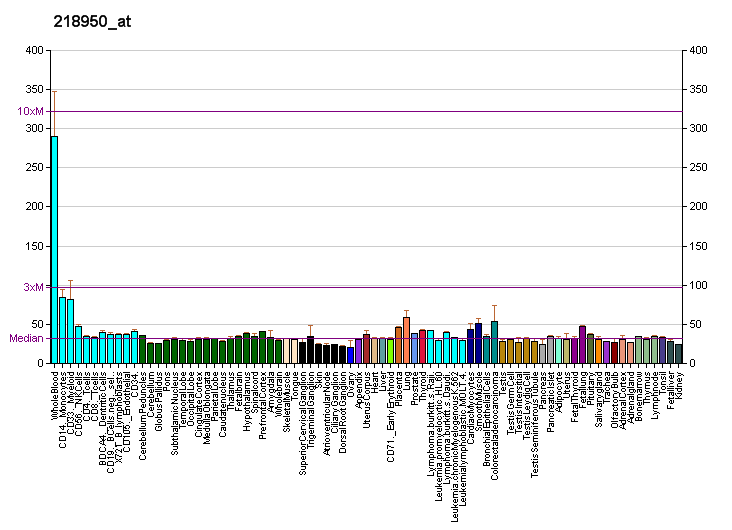
RNA expression pattern
| Bgee | Human / Mouse (ortholog); Top expressed in: apex of heart; right lung; blood; upper lobe of left lung; tendon of biceps brachii; left ventricle; canal of the cervix; right auricle of heart; subcutaneous adipose tissue; ventricular zone / Top expressed in: granulocyte; tail of embryo; yolk sac; genital tubercle; muscle of thigh; esophagus; zygote; embryo; right kidney; lip; More reference expression data |
| BioGPS | More reference expression data |
Gene ontology
| Molecular function | metal ion binding; phosphatidylinositol-3,4-bisphosphate binding; protein binding; GTPase activator activity; phosphatidylinositol-3,4,5-trisphosphate binding |
| Cellular component | cytosol; cell projection; membrane; plasma membrane; cytoskeleton; lamellipodium; ruffle; cytoplasm |
| Biological process | positive regulation of GTPase activity; negative regulation of Rac protein signal transduction; cytoskeleton organization; regulation of small GTPase mediated signal transduction; vesicle-mediated transport; signal transduction; negative regulation of cell migration; negative regulation of Rho protein signal transduction; regulation of cell shape |
Sources:Amigo / QuickGO
Orthologs
| Databases | NCBI: entry; OMA: entry |
| Species | Human | Mouse |
| Entrez | 64411 | 106952 |
| Ensembl | ENSG00000120318 | ENSMUSG00000024451 |
| UniProt | Q8WWN8 | Q8R5G7 |
| RefSeq (mRNA) | NM_022481 | NM_001205336; NM_139206 |
| RefSeq (protein) | NP_071926 | NP_001192265; NP_631945 |
| Location (UCSC) | Chr 5: 141.65 – 141.68 Mb | Chr 18: 38.11 – 38.13 Mb |
| PubMed search |
- Wikidata
| View/Edit Human | View/Edit Mouse |

Arf-GAP with Rho-GAP domain, ANK repeat and PH domain-containing protein 3 is a protein that in humans is encoded by the ARAP3 gene.

This gene encodes a phosphoinositide binding protein containing ARF-GAP, RHO-GAP, RAS-associating, and pleckstrin homology domains. The ARF-GAP and RHO-GAP domains cooperate in mediating rearrangements in the cell cytoskeleton and cell shape. It is a specific PtdIns(3,4,5)P3/PtdIns(3,4)P2-stimulated Arf6-GAP protein. An alternatively spliced transcript has been found for this gene, but its full-length nature has not been determined.
