= ARHGAP8 =

Protein-coding gene in the species Homo sapiens

Identifiers
- Aliases: ARHGAP8, BPGAP1, PP610, Rho GTPase activating protein 8
- External IDs: OMIM: 609405; MGI: 1920417; GeneCards: ARHGAP8

Gene location (Human)
Chr.	Chromosome 22 (human)
Band	22q13.31	Start	44,752,558 bp
Band	22q13.31	End	44,862,788 bp

Gene location (Mouse)
Chr.	Chromosome 15 (mouse)
Band	15|15 E2	Start	84,604,253 bp
Band	15|15 E2	End	84,656,408 bp
RNA expression pattern
Bgee	Human / Mouse (ortholog); Top expressed in: right uterine tube; left lobe of thyroid gland; right lobe of thyroid gland; mucosa of transverse colon; body of pancreas; minor salivary glands; anterior pituitary; spleen; rectum; human kidney / Top expressed in: seminal vesicula; yolk sac; parotid gland; blastocyst; vestibular membrane of cochlear duct; zygote; epithelium of stomach; vestibular sensory epithelium; secondary oocyte; genital tubercle; More reference expression data
BioGPS	n/a
Gene ontology
Molecular function	protein binding; GTPase activator activity
Cellular component	cytoplasm; cytosol
Biological process	regulation of small GTPase mediated signal transduction; signal transduction; positive regulation of ERK1 and ERK2 cascade; positive regulation of GTPase activity
Sources:Amigo / QuickGO
Orthologs
Databases	NCBI: entry; OMA: entry
Species	Human	Mouse
Entrez	23779	73167
Ensembl	ENSG00000241484	ENSMUSG00000078954
UniProt	P85298	Q9CXP4
RefSeq (mRNA)	NM_181335; NM_001017526; NM_001198726	NM_001164627; NM_001164628; NM_001205334; NM_028455
RefSeq (protein)	NP_001017526; NP_001185655; NP_851852	NP_001158099; NP_001158100; NP_001192263; NP_082731
Location (UCSC)	Chr 22: 44.75 – 44.86 Mb	Chr 15: 84.6 – 84.66 Mb
PubMed search
- Wikidata
View/Edit Human	View/Edit Mouse

Rho GTPase-activating protein 8 is a protein that in humans is encoded by the ARHGAP8 gene.

== Function ==
This gene encodes a member of the RHOGAP family. GAP (GTPase-activating) family proteins participate in signaling pathways that regulate cell processes involved in cytoskeletal changes. GAP proteins alternate between an active (GTP-bound) and inactive (GDP-bound) state based on the GTP:GDP ratio in the cell. Rare read-through transcripts, containing exons from the PRR5 gene which is located immediately upstream, led to the original description of this gene as encoding a RHOGAP protein containing the proline-rich domains characteristic of PRR5 proteins. Alternatively spliced variants encoding different isoforms have been described.
