= ARHGAP9 =

Protein-coding gene in humans

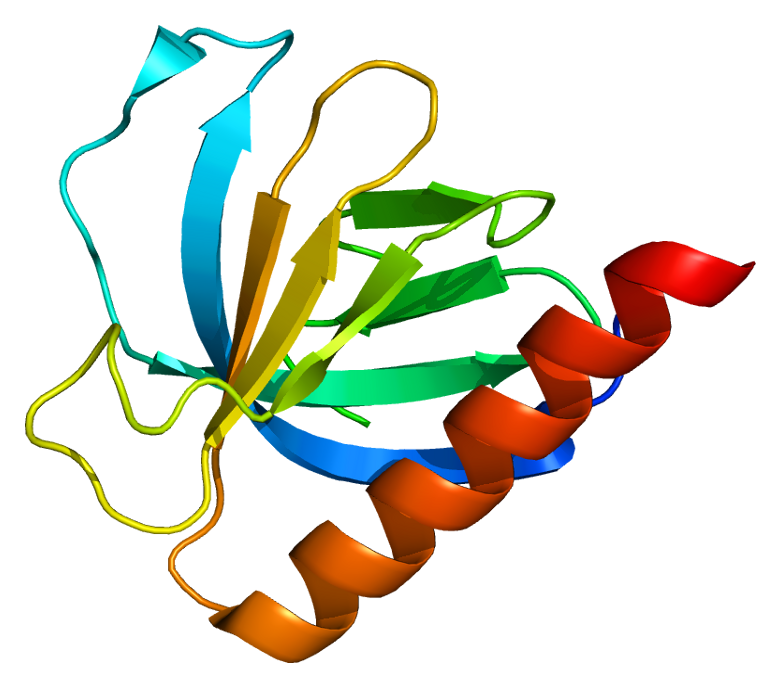

Identifiers
- Aliases: ARHGAP9, 10C, RGL1, Rho GTPase activating protein 9
- External IDs: OMIM: 610576; MGI: 2143764; GeneCards: ARHGAP9
Available structures
PDB	Human UniProt search: PDBe RCSB
PDB	List of PDB id codes 2P0D, 2P0H

Gene location (Human)
Chr.	Chromosome 12 (human)
Band	12q13.3	Start	57,472,264 bp
Band	12q13.3	End	57,488,814 bp

Gene location (Mouse)
Chr.	Chromosome 10 (mouse)
Band	10|10 D3	Start	127,157,833 bp
Band	10|10 D3	End	127,165,812 bp
RNA expression pattern
Bgee	Human / Mouse (ortholog); Top expressed in: granulocyte; blood; spleen; appendix; monocyte; lymph node; bone marrow; bone marrow cell; trabecular bone; mucosa of ileum / Top expressed in: granulocyte; mesenteric lymph nodes; blood; thymus; bone marrow; spleen; tibiofemoral joint; submandibular gland; parotid gland; stroma of bone marrow; More reference expression data
BioGPS	n/a
Gene ontology
Molecular function	protein binding; phosphatidylinositol-3,4,5-trisphosphate binding; lipid binding; GTPase activator activity
Cellular component	cytosol; extracellular region; secretory granule lumen; cytoplasm
Biological process	regulation of small GTPase mediated signal transduction; signal transduction; positive regulation of GTPase activity; neutrophil degranulation; regulation of GTPase activity
Sources:Amigo / QuickGO
Orthologs
Databases	NCBI: entry; OMA: entry
Species	Human	Mouse
Entrez	64333	216445
Ensembl	ENSG00000123329	ENSMUSG00000040345
UniProt	Q9BRR9	n/a
RefSeq (mRNA)	NM_001080156; NM_001080157; NM_032496; NM_001319850; NM_001319851 NM_001319852; NM_001367422; NM_001367423; NM_001367424; NM_001367425; NM_001367426	NM_001285785; NM_146011; NM_001359656; NM_001359657
RefSeq (protein)	NP_001073625; NP_001073626; NP_001306779; NP_001306780; NP_001306781 NP_115885; NP_001354351; NP_001354352; NP_001354353; NP_001354354; NP_001354355; NP_001306779.1	n/a
Location (UCSC)	Chr 12: 57.47 – 57.49 Mb	Chr 10: 127.16 – 127.17 Mb
PubMed search
- Wikidata
View/Edit Human	View/Edit Mouse

Rho GTPase-activating protein 9 is an enzyme that in humans is encoded by the ARHGAP9 gene.

== Function ==
This gene encodes a member of the Rho-GAP family of GTPase activating proteins. The protein has substantial GAP activity towards several Rho-family GTPases in vitro, converting them to an inactive GDP-bound state. It is implicated in regulating adhesion of hematopoietic cells to the extracellular matrix. Multiple transcript variants encoding different isoforms have been found for this gene.
