= STARD13 =

Protein-coding gene in the species Homo sapiens

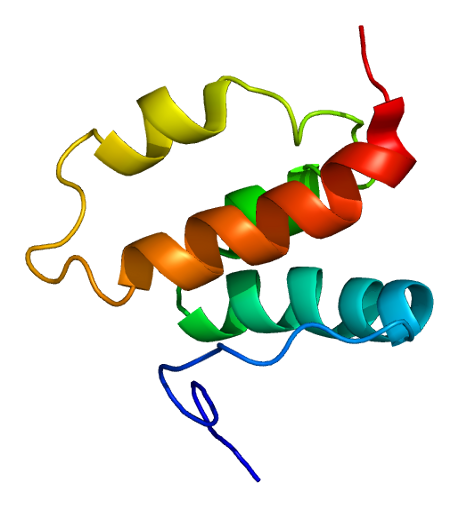

Identifiers
- Aliases: STARD13, ARHGAP37, DLC2, GT650, LINC00464, StAR related lipid transfer domain containing 13
- External IDs: OMIM: 609866; MGI: 2385331; GeneCards: STARD13
Available structures
PDB	Ortholog search: PDBe RCSB
PDB	List of PDB id codes 2H80, 2JW2, 2PSO

Gene location (Human)
Chr.	Chromosome 13 (human)
Band	13q13.1-q13.2	Start	33,103,137 bp
Band	13q13.1-q13.2	End	33,350,630 bp

Gene location (Mouse)
Chr.	Chromosome 5 (mouse)
Band	5|5 G3	Start	150,960,975 bp
Band	5|5 G3	End	151,157,301 bp
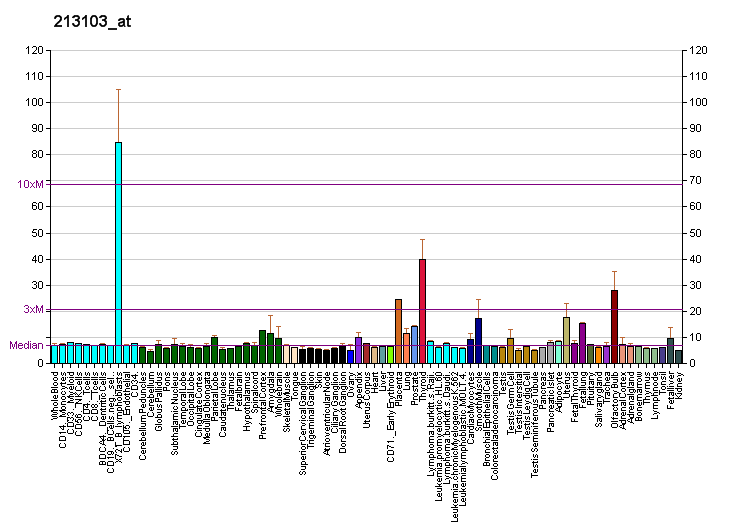
RNA expression pattern
Bgee	Human / Mouse (ortholog); Top expressed in: sural nerve; muscle layer of sigmoid colon; epithelium of colon; spinal ganglia; trigeminal ganglion; right lung; thyroid gland; left lobe of thyroid gland; right lobe of thyroid gland; Achilles tendon / Top expressed in: zygote; secondary oocyte; lumbar spinal ganglion; vestibular membrane of cochlear duct; primary oocyte; retinal pigment epithelium; sciatic nerve; left lung lobe; right lung lobe; saccule; More reference expression data
BioGPS	More reference expression data
Gene ontology
Molecular function	protein binding; lipid binding; GTPase activator activity
Cellular component	cytoplasm; cytosol; lipid droplet; mitochondrial membranes; mitochondrion; membrane
Biological process	negative regulation of cell migration involved in sprouting angiogenesis; positive regulation of GTPase activity; endothelial tube lumen extension; regulation of small GTPase mediated signal transduction; endothelial cell migration; signal transduction
Sources:Amigo / QuickGO
Orthologs
Databases	NCBI: entry; OMA: entry
Species	Human	Mouse
Entrez	90627	243362
Ensembl	ENSG00000133121	ENSMUSG00000016128
UniProt	Q9Y3M8	Q923Q2
RefSeq (mRNA)	NM_001243466; NM_001243474; NM_001243476; NM_052851; NM_178006 NM_178007; NM_178008	NM_001163493; NM_146258; NM_001359985
RefSeq (protein)	NP_001230395; NP_001230403; NP_001230405; NP_443083; NP_821074 NP_821075	NP_001156965; NP_666370; NP_001346914
Location (UCSC)	Chr 13: 33.1 – 33.35 Mb	Chr 5: 150.96 – 151.16 Mb
PubMed search
- Wikidata
View/Edit Human	View/Edit Mouse

StAR-related lipid transfer domain protein 13 (STARD13) also known as deleted in liver cancer 2 protein (DLC-2) is a protein that in humans is encoded by the STARD13 gene and a member of the DLC family of proteins.

== Structure ==
The protein consists of an N-terminal sterile alpha motif (SAM) domain, a serine-rich domain, a RhoGAP domain and at the C-terminus, a StAR-related lipid-transfer domain (START).

== Function ==
STARD13 serves as a Rho GTPase-activating protein (GAP), a type of protein that regulates members of the Rho family of GTPases. It selectively activates RhoA and CDC42 and suppresses cell growth by inhibiting actin stress fiber assembly.

== Clinical significance ==
The protein was identified in part through its differential expression in cancers. A low level of STARD13 was observed in less differentiated hepatocellular carcinoma tissue with higher RhoA expression. A small patient study finds that the absence of STARD13 in hepatocellular carcinomas correlates with higher levels of RhoA and a poorer prognosis than patients with carcinomas that were STARD13-positive.
