= FAM13C =

Protein-coding gene in the species Homo sapiens

Identifiers
- Aliases: FAM13C, FAM13C1, family with sequence similarity 13 member C
- External IDs: MGI: 1918971; HomoloGene: 11490; GeneCards: FAM13C; OMA:FAM13C - orthologs

Gene location (Human)
Chr.	Chromosome 10 (human)
Band	10q21.1	Start	59,246,130 bp
Band	10q21.1	End	59,363,181 bp

Gene location (Mouse)
Chr.	Chromosome 10 (mouse)
Band	10|10 B5.3	Start	70,276,311 bp
Band	10|10 B5.3	End	70,394,566 bp
RNA expression pattern
Bgee	Human / Mouse (ortholog); Top expressed in: corpus callosum; inferior ganglion of vagus nerve; subthalamic nucleus; Medulla Oblongata; Pons; internal globus pallidus; superior vestibular nucleus; C1 segment; endothelial cell; pars reticulata / Top expressed in: lateral septal nucleus; mammillary body; anterior amygdaloid area; ventromedial nucleus; lateral hypothalamus; supraoptic nucleus; secondary oocyte; deep cerebellar nuclei; medial vestibular nucleus; subiculum; More reference expression data
BioGPS	n/a
Orthologs
Species	Human	Mouse
Entrez	220965	71721
Ensembl	ENSG00000148541	ENSMUSG00000043259
UniProt	Q8NE31	Q9DBR2
RefSeq (mRNA)	NM_001001971; NM_001143773; NM_001166698; NM_001347840; NM_001347842 NM_001347843; NM_001347844; NM_001347845; NM_001347846; NM_001347847; NM_001347848; NM_001347849; NM_001347850; NM_001347851; NM_001347852; NM_198215	NM_001143776; NM_001143777; NM_024244; NM_001359551
RefSeq (protein)	NP_001001971; NP_001137245; NP_001160170; NP_001334769; NP_001334771 NP_001334772; NP_001334773; NP_001334774; NP_001334775; NP_001334776; NP_001334777; NP_001334778; NP_001334779; NP_001334780; NP_001334781; NP_937858	NP_001137248; NP_001137249; NP_077206; NP_001346480
Location (UCSC)	Chr 10: 59.25 – 59.36 Mb	Chr 10: 70.28 – 70.39 Mb
PubMed search
- Wikidata
View/Edit Human	View/Edit Mouse

Family with sequence similarity 13, member C is a protein that in humans is encoded by the FAM13C gene.
