= PART1 =

Long non-coding RNA

Identifiers
- Aliases: PART1, NCRNA00206, prostate androgen-regulated transcript 1 (non-protein coding), prostate androgen-regulated transcript 1
- External IDs: OMIM: 604991; GeneCards: PART1

Gene location (Human)
Chr.	Chromosome 5 (human)
Band	5q12.1	Start	60,487,713 bp
Band	5q12.1	End	60,548,813 bp
RNA expression pattern
Bgee	Human / Mouse (ortholog); Top expressed in: endothelial cell; middle temporal gyrus; Brodmann area 23; orbitofrontal cortex; Brodmann area 46; superior frontal gyrus; Brodmann area 10; frontal pole; right uterine tube; dorsolateral prefrontal cortex / n/a; More reference expression data
BioGPS	n/a
Orthologs
Databases	NCBI: entry; OMA: entry
Species	Human	Mouse
Entrez	25859	n/a
Ensembl	ENSG00000152931	n/a
UniProt	n a	n/a
RefSeq (mRNA)	NM_001039499; NM_001040639	n/a
RefSeq (protein)	n/a	n/a
Location (UCSC)	Chr 5: 60.49 – 60.55 Mb	n/a
PubMed search		n/a
- Wikidata
View/Edit Human

In molecular biology, Prostate androgen-regulated transcript 1 (non-protein coding), also known as PART1, is a long non-coding RNA. In humans, the PART-1 gene is located on chromosome 5q12. It is highly expressed in the human prostate gland. Its expression in prostate cancer cells is increased in response to androgens. It has been suggested that this gene may play a role in prostate carcinogenesis.

== See also ==
- Long noncoding RNA
