= ARHGAP4 =

Protein-coding gene in humans

Identifiers
- Aliases: ARHGAP4, C1, RGC1, RhoGAP4, SrGAP4, p115, Rho GTPase activating protein 4
- External IDs: OMIM: 300023; MGI: 2159577; GeneCards: ARHGAP4
Available structures
PDB	Human UniProt search: PDBe RCSB
PDB	List of PDB id codes 2EPD

Gene location (Human)
Chr.	X chromosome (human)
Band	Xq28	Start	153,907,367 bp
Band	Xq28	End	153,934,999 bp

Gene location (Mouse)
Chr.	X chromosome (mouse)
Band	X|X A7.3	Start	72,935,048 bp
Band	X|X A7.3	End	72,965,476 bp
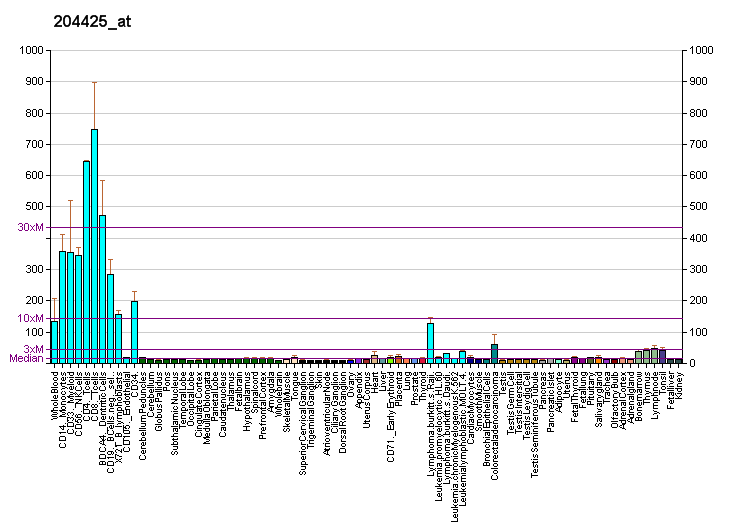
RNA expression pattern
Bgee	Human / Mouse (ortholog); Top expressed in: granulocyte; spleen; monocyte; lymph node; blood; right lung; upper lobe of left lung; appendix; right hemisphere of cerebellum; apex of heart / Top expressed in: granulocyte; thymus; spleen; mesenteric lymph nodes; blood; tibiofemoral joint; bone marrow; subcutaneous adipose tissue; otic vesicle; embryo; More reference expression data
BioGPS	More reference expression data
Gene ontology
Molecular function	protein binding; GTPase activator activity; identical protein binding
Cellular component	cytosol; Golgi apparatus; growth cone; microtubule; cytoplasm
Biological process	negative regulation of fibroblast migration; nervous system development; positive regulation of GTPase activity; negative regulation of cell migration; cytoskeleton organization; Rho protein signal transduction; regulation of small GTPase mediated signal transduction; negative regulation of axon extension; signal transduction; positive regulation of signal transduction
Sources:Amigo / QuickGO
Orthologs
Databases	NCBI: entry; OMA: entry
Species	Human	Mouse
Entrez	393	171207
Ensembl	ENSG00000089820	ENSMUSG00000031389
UniProt	P98171	n/a
RefSeq (mRNA)	NM_001666; NM_001164741	NM_001162423; NM_001162424; NM_138630
RefSeq (protein)	NP_001158213; NP_001657	n/a
Location (UCSC)	Chr X: 153.91 – 153.93 Mb	Chr X: 72.94 – 72.97 Mb
PubMed search
- Wikidata
View/Edit Human	View/Edit Mouse

Rho GTPase-activating protein 4 is an enzyme that in humans is encoded by the ARHGAP4 gene. It has been shown to regulate cell motility and axonal outgrowth in vitro.
