= ARHGAP18 =

Protein-coding gene in the species Homo sapiens

Identifiers
- Aliases: ARHGAP18, MacGAP, SENEX, bA307O14.2, Rho GTPase activating protein 18
- External IDs: OMIM: 613351; MGI: 1921160; GeneCards: ARHGAP18

Gene location (Human)
Chr.	Chromosome 6 (human)
Band	6q22.33	Start	129,576,132 bp
Band	6q22.33	End	129,710,177 bp

Gene location (Mouse)
Chr.	Chromosome 10 (mouse)
Band	10|10 A4	Start	26,629,417 bp
Band	10|10 A4	End	26,794,644 bp
RNA expression pattern
Bgee	Human / Mouse (ortholog); Top expressed in: germinal epithelium; bronchial epithelial cell; oocyte; secondary oocyte; parietal pleura; visceral pleura; pancreatic epithelial cell; mucosa of paranasal sinus; renal medulla; jejunal mucosa / Top expressed in: cumulus cell; left lung lobe; blood; epithelium of small intestine; dermis; migratory enteric neural crest cell; seminal vesicula; right kidney; epithelium of stomach; proximal tubule; More reference expression data
BioGPS	n/a
Gene ontology
Molecular function	GTPase activator activity; cadherin binding
Cellular component	cytoplasm; cytosol; plasma membrane; nuclear speck
Biological process	regulation of actin filament polymerization; regulation of small GTPase mediated signal transduction; regulation of actin cytoskeleton organization; signal transduction; regulation of cell shape; regulation of cell motility; positive regulation of GTPase activity; small GTPase mediated signal transduction
Sources:Amigo / QuickGO
Orthologs
Databases	NCBI: entry; OMA: entry
Species	Human	Mouse
Entrez	93663	73910
Ensembl	ENSG00000146376	ENSMUSG00000039031
UniProt	Q8N392	Q8K0Q5
RefSeq (mRNA)	NM_033515	NM_176837
RefSeq (protein)	NP_277050	NP_789807
Location (UCSC)	Chr 6: 129.58 – 129.71 Mb	Chr 10: 26.63 – 26.79 Mb
PubMed search
- Wikidata
View/Edit Human	View/Edit Mouse

Rho GTPase activating protein 18 is a protein that in humans is encoded by the ARHGAP18 gene. The gene is also known as MacGAP and bA307O14.2. ARHGAP18 belongs to a family of Rho GTPase-activating proteins that modulate cell signaling.
