= ARHGAP19 =

Protein-coding gene in the species Homo sapiens

Identifiers
- Aliases: ARHGAP19, Rho GTPase activating protein 19
- External IDs: OMIM: 611587; MGI: 1918335; GeneCards: ARHGAP19

Gene location (Human)
Chr.	Chromosome 10 (human)
Band	10q24.1	Start	97,222,173 bp
Band	10q24.1	End	97,292,673 bp

Gene location (Mouse)
Chr.	Chromosome 19 (mouse)
Band	19|19 C3	Start	41,755,027 bp
Band	19|19 C3	End	41,790,486 bp
RNA expression pattern
Bgee	Human / Mouse (ortholog); Top expressed in: trigeminal ganglion; olfactory bulb; secondary oocyte; tibial nerve; spinal ganglia; glomerulus; metanephric glomerulus; testicle; gonad; ventricular zone / Top expressed in: otolith organ; utricle; sciatic nerve; stroma of bone marrow; spermatocyte; primitive streak; lumbar spinal ganglion; hand; granulocyte; spermatid; More reference expression data
BioGPS	n/a
Gene ontology
Molecular function	GTPase activator activity
Cellular component	nucleus; cytosol; plasma membrane; intracellular membrane-bounded organelle; cytoplasm
Biological process	positive regulation of GTPase activity; signal transduction; regulation of small GTPase mediated signal transduction
Sources:Amigo / QuickGO
Orthologs
Databases	NCBI: entry; OMA: entry
Species	Human	Mouse
Entrez	84986	71085
Ensembl	ENSG00000213390	ENSMUSG00000025154
UniProt	Q14CB8	Q8BRH3
RefSeq (mRNA)	NM_032900; NM_001204300; NM_001256423	NM_001163495; NM_027667
RefSeq (protein)	NP_001191229; NP_001243352; NP_116289	NP_001156967; NP_081943
Location (UCSC)	Chr 10: 97.22 – 97.29 Mb	Chr 19: 41.76 – 41.79 Mb
PubMed search
- Wikidata
View/Edit Human	View/Edit Mouse

Rho GTPase-activating protein 19 is an enzyme that in humans is encoded by the ARHGAP19 gene.

Mutations in the ARHGAP19 gene are linked to an inherited form of Charcot-Marie-Tooth disease.
