= LRRC3B =

Identifiers
- Aliases: LRRC3B, LRP15, leucine rich repeat containing 3B
- External IDs: MGI: 2384996; HomoloGene: 14190; GeneCards: LRRC3B; OMA:LRRC3B - orthologs

Gene location (Human)
Chr.	Chromosome 3 (human)
Band	3p24.1	Start	26,622,806 bp
Band	3p24.1	End	26,717,537 bp

Gene location (Mouse)
Chr.	Chromosome 14 (mouse)
Band	14|14 A1	Start	7,030,776 bp
Band	14|14 A1	End	7,112,248 bp
RNA expression pattern
Bgee	Human / Mouse (ortholog); Top expressed in: ventricular zone; ganglionic eminence; secondary oocyte; Cerebellum; cerebellar cortex; cerebellar hemisphere; right hemisphere of cerebellum; Amygdala; pars reticulata; pars compacta / Top expressed in: habenula; right ventricle; cardiac muscles; olfactory epithelium; lobe of cerebellum; interventricular septum; ventral tegmental area; cerebellar vermis; extraocular muscle; myocardium of ventricle; More reference expression data
BioGPS	n/a
Orthologs
Species	Human	Mouse
Entrez	116135	218763
Ensembl	ENSG00000179796	ENSMUSG00000045201
UniProt	Q96PB8	Q8VCH9
RefSeq (mRNA)	NM_052953; NM_001317808; NM_001317809; NM_001317810; NM_001317811 NM_001395645; NM_001395646; NM_001395647	NM_146052
RefSeq (protein)	NP_001304737; NP_001304738; NP_001304739; NP_001304740; NP_443185	NP_666164
Location (UCSC)	Chr 3: 26.62 – 26.72 Mb	Chr 14: 7.03 – 7.11 Mb
PubMed search
- Wikidata
View/Edit Human	View/Edit Mouse

LRRC3B is a gene frequently epigenetically inactivated in several epithelial malignancies and inhibits cell growth and replication. Data suggest that the LRRC3B gene could be involved in the process of carcinogenesis as a tumor suppressor gene.
