= PLEK2 =

Protein-coding gene in the species Homo sapiens

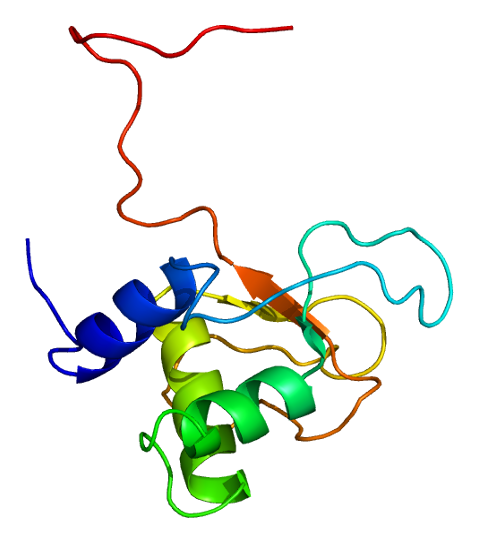

Identifiers
- Aliases: PLEK2, pleckstrin 2
- External IDs: OMIM: 608007; MGI: 1351466; GeneCards: PLEK2
Available structures
PDB	Ortholog search: PDBe RCSB
PDB	List of PDB id codes 1X1G

Gene location (Human)
Chr.	Chromosome 14 (human)
Band	14q23.3-q24.1	Start	67,386,984 bp
Band	14q23.3-q24.1	End	67,412,167 bp

Gene location (Mouse)
Chr.	Chromosome 12 (mouse)
Band	12|12 C3	Start	78,935,465 bp
Band	12|12 C3	End	78,953,738 bp
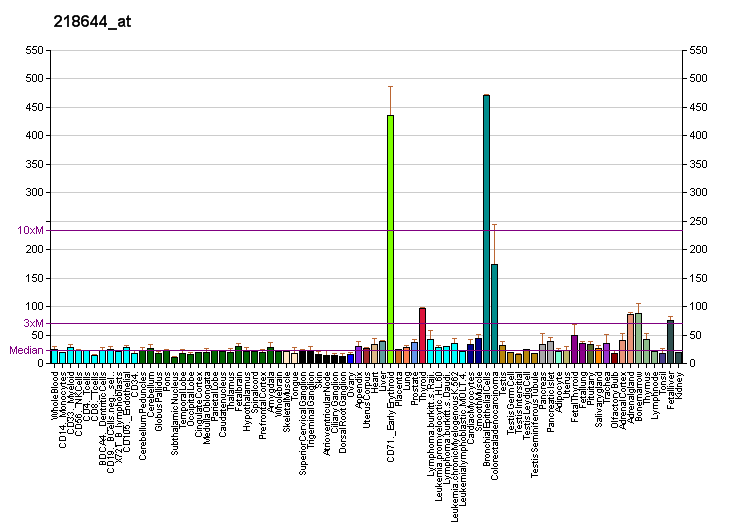
RNA expression pattern
Bgee	Human / Mouse (ortholog); Top expressed in: oocyte; secondary oocyte; mucosa of transverse colon; right adrenal cortex; gingival epithelium; left adrenal gland; left adrenal cortex; corpus epididymis; rectum; jejunal mucosa / Top expressed in: Paneth cell; molar; fetal liver hematopoietic progenitor cell; lumbar spinal ganglion; gastric mucosa; mucous cell of stomach; epithelium of stomach; pyloric antrum; duodenum; lip; More reference expression data
BioGPS	More reference expression data
Gene ontology
Molecular function	phosphatidylinositol-3,4-bisphosphate binding; phosphatidylinositol-3,5-bisphosphate binding; phosphatidylinositol-3-phosphate binding
Cellular component	cytoplasm; plasma membrane; cell projection; lamellipodium membrane; cytoskeleton; membrane
Biological process	intracellular signal transduction; actin cytoskeleton organization; positive regulation of cell projection organization; actin cytoskeleton reorganization; positive regulation of plasma membrane bounded cell projection assembly
Sources:Amigo / QuickGO
Orthologs
Databases	NCBI: entry; OMA: entry
Species	Human	Mouse
Entrez	26499	27260
Ensembl	ENSG00000100558	ENSMUSG00000021118
UniProt	Q9NYT0	Q9WV52
RefSeq (mRNA)	NM_016445	NM_013738
RefSeq (protein)	NP_057529	NP_038766
Location (UCSC)	Chr 14: 67.39 – 67.41 Mb	Chr 12: 78.94 – 78.95 Mb
PubMed search
- Wikidata
View/Edit Human	View/Edit Mouse

Pleckstrin-2 is a protein that in humans is encoded by the PLEK2 gene. The PLEK2 gene is located on chromosome 14 in Homo sapiens and is flanked by TMEM229B to its right and ATP6V1D to its left.
