= HIGD1A =

Protein-coding gene in the species Homo sapiens

Available structures
| PDB | Ortholog search: PDBe RCSB |
| PDB | List of PDB id codes 2LOM |

Identifiers
- Aliases: HIGD1A, HIG1, RCF1a, HIG1 hypoxia inducible domain family member 1A
- External IDs: MGI: 1930666; HomoloGene: 121937; GeneCards: HIGD1A; OMA:HIGD1A - orthologs

Gene location (Human)
| Chr. | Chromosome 3 (human) |
| Band | 3p22.1 | Start | 42,782,908 bp |
| Band | 3p22.1 | End | 42,804,490 bp |

Gene location (Mouse)
| Chr. | Chromosome 9 (mouse) |
| Band | 9|9 F4 | Start | 121,848,563 bp |
| Band | 9|9 F4 | End | 121,858,362 bp |
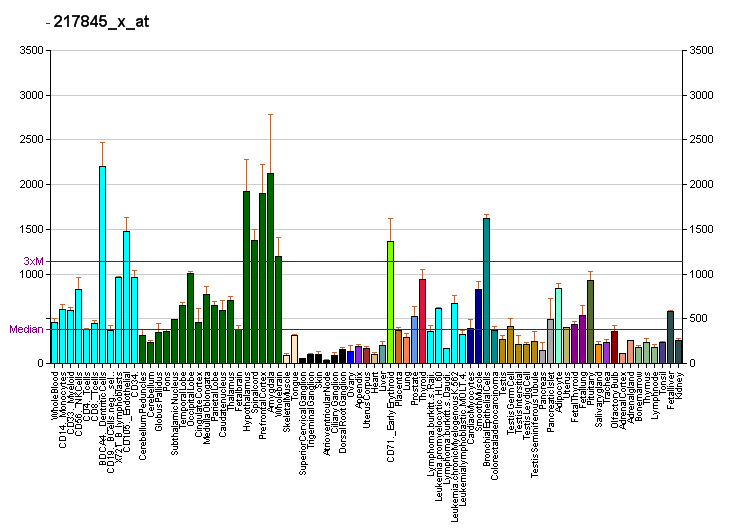

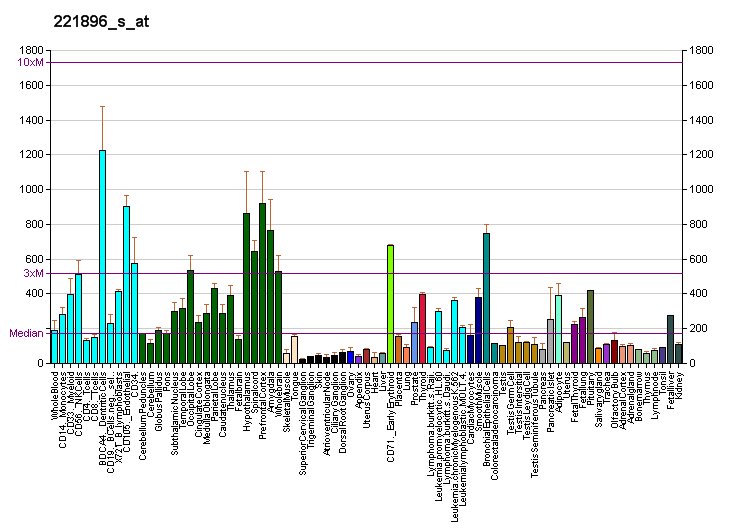
RNA expression pattern
| Bgee | Human / Mouse (ortholog); Top expressed in: rectum; gastric mucosa; C1 segment; mucosa of transverse colon; Brodmann area 9; cingulate gyrus; anterior cingulate cortex; right frontal lobe; smooth muscle tissue; right auricle of heart / Top expressed in: facial motor nucleus; embryo; right kidney; embryo; Region I of hippocampus proper; medial vestibular nucleus; ventral tegmental area; habenula; lateral septal nucleus; dorsal tegmental nucleus; More reference expression data |
| BioGPS | More reference expression data |
Orthologs
| Species | Human | Mouse |
| Entrez | 25994 | 56295 |
| Ensembl | ENSG00000181061 | ENSMUSG00000038412 |
| UniProt | Q9Y241 | Q9JLR9 |
| RefSeq (mRNA) | NM_014056; NM_001099668; NM_001099669 | NM_019814 |
| RefSeq (protein) | NP_001093138; NP_001093139; NP_054775 | NP_062788; NP_001344766; NP_001344767; NP_001344768; NP_001344769 NP_001344770 |
| Location (UCSC) | Chr 3: 42.78 – 42.8 Mb | Chr 9: 121.85 – 121.86 Mb |
| PubMed search |
- Wikidata
| View/Edit Human | View/Edit Mouse |

HIG1 domain family member 1A (HIGD1A), also known as hypoglycemia/hypoxia inducible mitochondrial protein1-a (HIMP1-a) and hypoxia induced gene 1 (HIG1), is a protein that in humans is encoded by the HIGD1A gene on chromosome 3. This protein promotes mitochondrial homeostasis and survival of cells under stress and is involved in inflammatory and hypoxia-related diseases, including atherosclerosis, ischemic heart disease, and Alzheimer's disease, as well as cancer.

== Structure ==
The protein encoded by this gene is 10.4 kDa mitochondrial inner membrane protein with two transmembrane domains at the N- and C-terminals. These two domains are arranged such that the N- and C-terminals face outward into the intermembrane space while the rest of the protein loops inside the matrix. Though the N-terminal domain is not necessary to direct the localization of HIGD1A, it is required for the survival of the protein.

The gene HIGD1A is an isoform of HIMP1-b via alternative splicing.

== Function ==
HIGD1A primarily functions in mitochondrial homeostasis and, thus, cell survival when under conditions of stress, such as hypoxia and glucose deprivation. For instance, HIGD1A promotes survival of pancreatic α and β cells under stress. HIGD1A has also been found in other parts of the brain, heart, liver, and kidney, where it enhances the survival of these organs. In macrophages, HIGD1A prevents apoptosis by inhibiting cytochrome C release and caspase activity.

HIGD1A is also involved in mitochondrial fusion by regulating OPA1 activity. Its inhibition of the cleavage of OPA1 preserves mitochondrial membrane potential, protects against apoptosis, and maintains ATP levels. Its role in mitochondrial fusion also influences downstream processes such as mtDNA synthesis, cell growth, and cristae organization.

In addition, HIGD1A helps preserve mitochondrial function by regulating mitochondrial γ-secretase activity under hypoxic conditions. In the absence of HIGD1A, γ-secretase contributes to the accumulation of amyloid beta in the mitochondria, leading to increased ROS production, mitochondrial dysfunction, and eventually, cell death.

While HIGD1A predominantly contributes to cell survival, it can also promote apoptosis in neurons during the early developmental stages of the central nervous system.

== Clinical significance ==
Since HIGD1A promotes cell survival under hypoxia, the protein protects organs like the heart and brain from hypoxia-related diseases. In particular, HIGD1A localization to the nucleus correlates with the severity of stress in ischemic heart disease, hypoxic-ischemic encephalopathy, and cancer, and thus may serve as a biomarker for these diseases. Moreover, HIGD1A is involved in inflammatory diseases, such as atherosclerosis and rheumatoid arthritis, through its role in macrophage survival. Similarly, HIGD1A could become a key target for treating Alzheimer's disease by inhibiting γ-secretase, and by extension, amyloid beta production. Notably, HIGD1A inhibits γ-secretase without interfering with Notch cleavage, thus minimizing detrimental side effects from targeting this protein.

== Interactions ==
HIGD1A is known to interact with:

- AIF,
- γ-secretase and
- OPA1.
