= DEPDC1 =

Protein-coding gene in humans

Identifiers
- Aliases: DEPDC1, DEP.8, DEPDC1-V2, DEPDC1A, SDP35, DEP domain containing 1
- External IDs: OMIM: 612002; MGI: 1923381; GeneCards: DEPDC1
Available structures
PDB	Ortholog search: PDBe RCSB
PDB	List of PDB id codes 2YSR

Gene location (Human)
Chr.	Chromosome 1 (human)
Band	1p31.3	Start	68,474,152 bp
Band	1p31.3	End	68,497,221 bp

Gene location (Mouse)
Chr.	Chromosome 3 (mouse)
Band	3|3 H4	Start	159,201,070 bp
Band	3|3 H4	End	159,235,592 bp
RNA expression pattern
Bgee	Human / Mouse (ortholog); Top expressed in: ventricular zone; gonad; testicle; trabecular bone; sperm; ganglionic eminence; stromal cell of endometrium; bone marrow; rectum; mucosa of ileum / Top expressed in: genital tubercle; tail of embryo; upper arm; mesenchyme; epiblast; spinal ganglia; thymus; ventricular zone; bone marrow; peripheral nervous system; More reference expression data
BioGPS	n/a
Gene ontology
Molecular function	protein binding; GTPase activator activity
Cellular component	transcription repressor complex; nucleus
Biological process	positive regulation of GTPase activity; intracellular signal transduction; negative regulation of transcription, DNA-templated; regulation of transcription, DNA-templated; transcription, DNA-templated; signal transduction
Sources:Amigo / QuickGO
Orthologs
Databases	NCBI: entry; OMA: entry
Species	Human	Mouse
Entrez	55635	76131
Ensembl	ENSG00000024526	ENSMUSG00000028175
UniProt	Q5TB30	Q8CIG0
RefSeq (mRNA)	NM_017779; NM_001114120	NM_001172092; NM_001172093; NM_029523
RefSeq (protein)	NP_001107592; NP_060249	NP_001165563; NP_001165564; NP_083799
Location (UCSC)	Chr 1: 68.47 – 68.5 Mb	Chr 3: 159.2 – 159.24 Mb
PubMed search
- Wikidata
View/Edit Human	View/Edit Mouse

DEP domain containing 1 is a protein in humans that is encoded by the DEPDC1 gene.
