= SRGAP3 =

Protein-coding gene in the species Homo sapiens

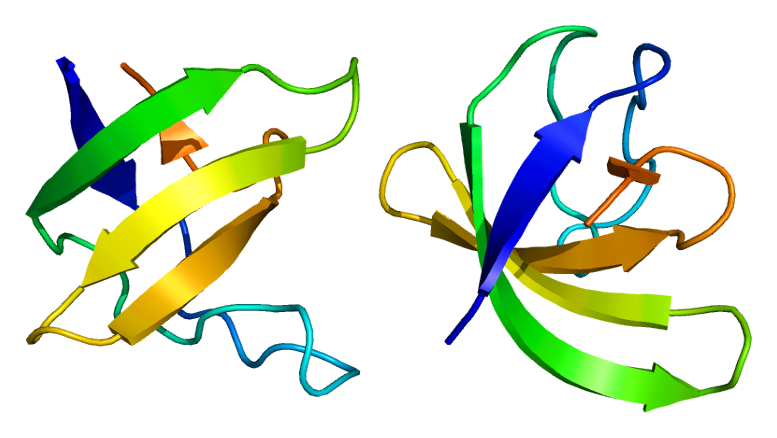

Identifiers
- Aliases: SRGAP3, ARHGAP14, MEGAP, SRGAP2, WRP, SLIT-ROBO Rho GTPase activating protein 3
- External IDs: OMIM: 606525; MGI: 2152938; GeneCards: SRGAP3
Available structures
PDB	Ortholog search: PDBe RCSB
PDB	List of PDB id codes 1AM4, 1GRN, 1OW3, 1RGP, 1TX4, 2NGR

Gene location (Human)
Chr.	Chromosome 3 (human)
Band	3p25.3	Start	8,980,591 bp
Band	3p25.3	End	9,363,053 bp

Gene location (Mouse)
Chr.	Chromosome 6 (mouse)
Band	6|6 E3	Start	112,694,932 bp
Band	6|6 E3	End	112,924,227 bp
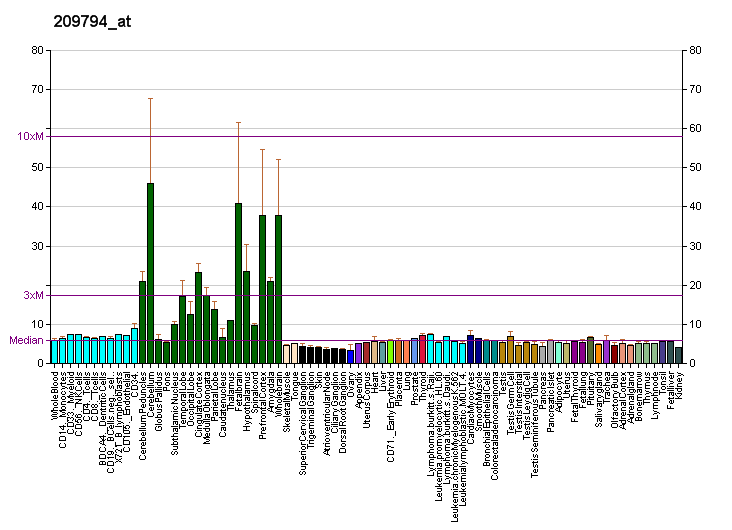
RNA expression pattern
Bgee	Human / Mouse (ortholog); Top expressed in: middle temporal gyrus; Brodmann area 23; paraflocculus of cerebellum; Brodmann area 10; frontal pole; right uterine tube; endothelial cell; Region I of hippocampus proper; Brodmann area 46; postcentral gyrus / Top expressed in: subiculum; pontine nuclei; superior colliculus; cingulate gyrus; piriform cortex; dentate gyrus; cerebellar vermis; lateral septal nucleus; hippocampus proper; anterior amygdaloid area; More reference expression data
BioGPS	More reference expression data
Gene ontology
Molecular function	protein binding; GTPase activator activity
Cellular component	cytoplasm; cytosol
Biological process	negative regulation of cell migration; regulation of small GTPase mediated signal transduction; signal transduction; positive regulation of GTPase activity
Sources:Amigo / QuickGO
Orthologs
Databases	NCBI: entry; OMA: entry
Species	Human	Mouse
Entrez	9901	259302
Ensembl	ENSG00000196220	ENSMUSG00000030257
UniProt	O43295	Q812A2
RefSeq (mRNA)	NM_001033116; NM_001033117; NM_014850	NM_080448; NM_153070
RefSeq (protein)	NP_001028289; NP_055665	NP_536696
Location (UCSC)	Chr 3: 8.98 – 9.36 Mb	Chr 6: 112.69 – 112.92 Mb
PubMed search
- Wikidata
View/Edit Human	View/Edit Mouse

SLIT-ROBO Rho GTPase-activating protein 3 is an enzyme that in humans is encoded by the SRGAP3 gene.
