= Family with sequence similarity 13, member A1 =

Protein-coding gene in the species Homo sapiens

FAM13A

Identifiers
- Aliases: FAM13A, ARHGAP48, FAM13A1, Family with sequence similarity 13, member A1, family with sequence similarity 13 member A
- External IDs: OMIM: 613299; MGI: 1889842; GeneCards: FAM13A

Gene location (Human)
Chr.	Chromosome 4 (human)
Band	4q22.1	Start	88,725,955 bp
Band	4q22.1	End	89,111,398 bp

Gene location (Mouse)
Chr.	Chromosome 6 (mouse)
Band	6|6 B3	Start	58,909,075 bp
Band	6|6 B3	End	59,001,534 bp
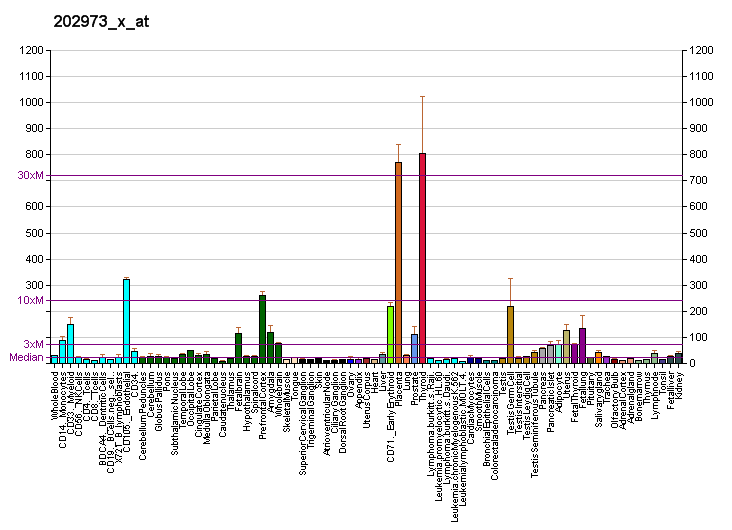

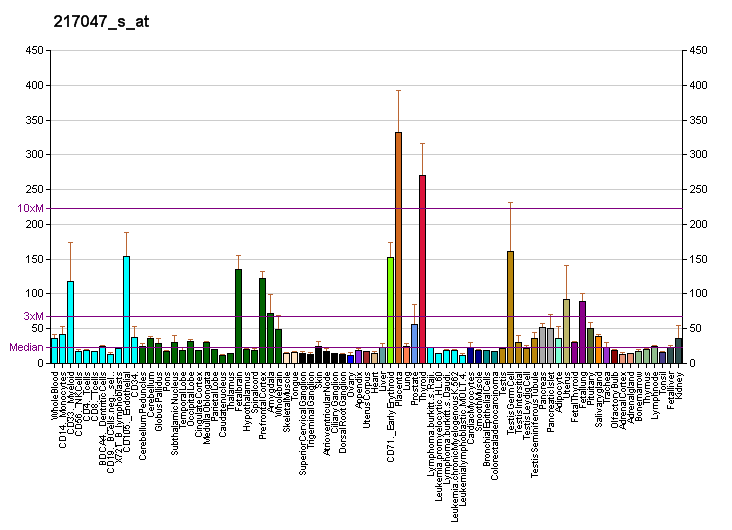

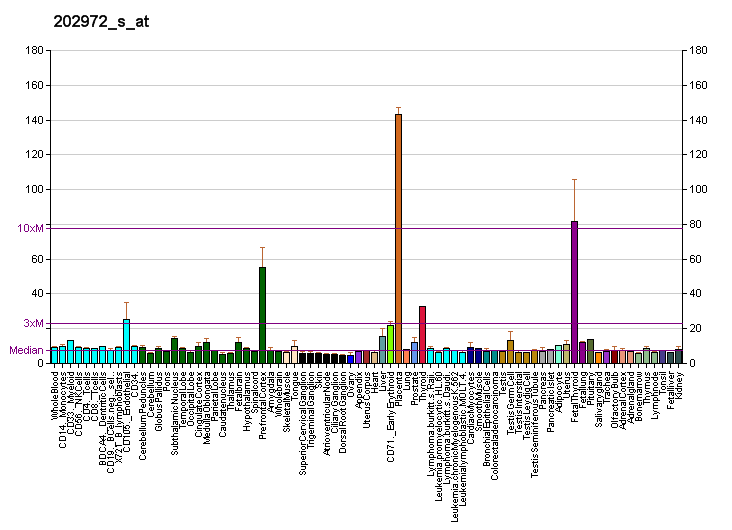
RNA expression pattern
Bgee	Human / Mouse (ortholog); Top expressed in: secondary oocyte; jejunal mucosa; retinal pigment epithelium; bronchial epithelial cell; Epithelium of choroid plexus; parietal pleura; parotid gland; hair follicle; renal medulla; duodenum / Top expressed in: retinal pigment epithelium; cumulus cell; brown adipose tissue; lobe of cerebellum; cerebellar vermis; ciliary body; intercostal muscle; mammary gland; otolith organ; utricle; More reference expression data
BioGPS	More reference expression data
Gene ontology
Molecular function	GTPase activator activity
Cellular component	cytosol
Biological process	positive regulation of GTPase activity; regulation of small GTPase mediated signal transduction; signal transduction
Sources:Amigo / QuickGO
Orthologs
Databases	NCBI: entry; OMA: entry
Species	Human	Mouse
Entrez	10144	58909
Ensembl	ENSG00000138640	ENSMUSG00000037709
UniProt	O94988; Q6P521	Q8BGI4
RefSeq (mRNA)	NM_001015045; NM_001265578; NM_001265579; NM_001265580; NM_014883	NM_153574
RefSeq (protein)	NP_001015045; NP_001252507; NP_001252508; NP_001252509; NP_055698	NP_705802
Location (UCSC)	Chr 4: 88.73 – 89.11 Mb	Chr 6: 58.91 – 59 Mb
PubMed search
- Wikidata
View/Edit Human	View/Edit Mouse

Protein FAM13A is a protein that in humans is encoded by the FAM13A gene.
