= DEP domain =

Domain found in Dishevelled, Egl-10, and Pleckstrin (DEP)
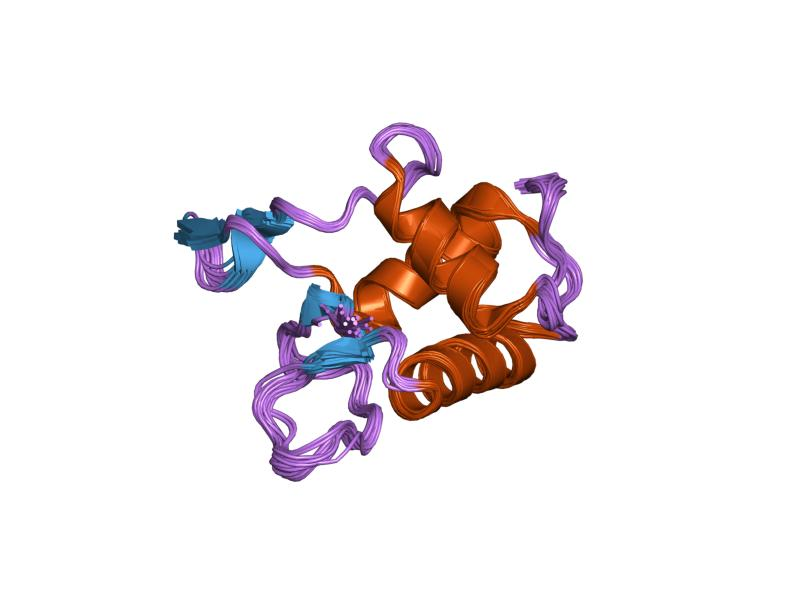
- structural basis of the recognition of the dishevelled dep domain in the wnt signaling pathway

Identifiers
- Symbol: DEP
- Pfam: PF00610
- InterPro: IPR000591
- CDD: cd04371
Available protein structures:
- Pfam: structures / ECOD
- PDB: RCSB PDB; PDBe; PDBj
- PDBsum: structure summary

In molecular biology, the DEP domain (Dishevelled, Egl-10 and Pleckstrin domain) is a globular protein domain of about 80 amino acids that is found in over 50 proteins involved in G-protein signalling pathways. It was named after the three proteins it was initially found in:

- Dishevelled (Dsh and Dvl), which plays a key role in the transduction of the Wg/Wnt signal from the cell surface to the nucleus; it is a segment polarity protein required to establish coherent arrays of polarised cells and segments in embryos, and plays a role in wingless signalling.
- Egl-10, which regulates G-protein signalling in the central nervous system in RGS9.
- Pleckstrin, the major substrate of protein kinase C in platelets; Pleckstrin contains two PH domains flanking the DEP domain.

Mammalian regulators of G-protein signalling also contain these domains, and regulate signal transduction by increasing the GTPase activity of G-protein alpha subunits, thereby driving them into their inactive GDP-bound form. It has been proposed that the DEP domain could play a selective role in targeting DEP domain-containing proteins to specific subcellular membranous sites, perhaps even to specific G protein-coupled signaling pathways. Nuclear magnetic resonance spectroscopy has revealed that the DEP domain comprises a three-helix bundle, a beta-hairpin 'arm' composed of two beta-strands and two short beta-strands in the C-terminal region.
