= PCTP =

PCTP may refer to:

- PCTP (gene)
- Phosphatidylcholine transfer protein
- Portuguese Workers' Communist Party
