= Higenamine =

- (S)-higenamine

Names
- IUPAC name 1-[(4-Hydroxyphenyl)methyl]-1,2,3,4-tetrahydroisoquinoline-6,7-diol
- Other names norcoclaurine, demethylcoclaurine

Identifiers
| CAS Number | (RS): 5843-65-2; (R): 106032-53-5; (S): 22672-77-1 |
| 3D model (JSmol) | (RS): Interactive image |
| ChEBI | (RS): CHEBI:18418 |
| ChEMBL | (RS): ChEMBL19344 |
| ChemSpider | (RS): 102800; (R): 389813; (S): 389757 |
| KEGG | (RS): C06346 |
| MeSH | higenamine |
| PubChem CID | (RS): 114840; (R): 440988; (S): 440927 |
| UNII | (RS): TBV5O16GAP; (R): 6016M93W29; (S): P94O9O6QM5 |
| CompTox Dashboard (EPA) | (RS): DTXSID70973974 |
- InChI: InChI=1S/C16H17NO3/c18-12-3-1-10(2-4-12)7-14-13-9-16(20)15(19)8-11(13)5-6-17-14/h1-4,8-9,14,17-20H,5-7H2 Key: WZRCQWQRFZITDX-UHFFFAOYSA-N; (RS): InChI=1/C16H17NO3/c18-12-3-1-10(2-4-12)7-14-13-9-16(20)15(19)8-11(13)5-6-17-14/h1-4,8-9,14,17-20H,5-7H2 Key: WZRCQWQRFZITDX-UHFFFAOYAH
- SMILES: (RS): Oc1ccc(cc1)CC3c2c(cc(O)c(O)c2)CCN3

Properties
| Chemical formula | C_{16}H_{17}NO_{3} |
| Molar mass | 271.316 g·mol^{−1} |
- Except where otherwise noted, data are given for materials in their standard state (at 25 °C [77 °F], 100 kPa). Infobox references

Higenamine (norcoclaurine) is a chemical compound found in a variety of plants including Nandina domestica (fruit), Aconitum carmichaelii (root), Asarum heterotropioides, Galium divaricatum (stem and vine), Annona squamosa, and Nelumbo nucifera (lotus seeds).

Higenamine is found as an ingredient in sports and weight loss dietary supplements sold in the US. The US Food and Drug Administration has received reports of adverse effects from higenamine-containing supplements since 2014, but higenamine's health risks remain poorly understood.

== Legality ==
Higenamine, also known as norcoclaurine HCl, is legal to use within food supplements in the UK, EU, the USA and Canada. Its main use is within food supplements developed for weight management and sports supplements. Traditional formulations with higenamine have been used for thousands of years within Chinese medicine and come from a variety of sources including fruit and orchids. There are no studies comparing the safety of modern formulations (based on synthetic higenamine) with traditional formulations. Nevertheless, it will not be added to the EU 'novel foods' catalogue, which details all food supplements that require a safety assessment certificate before use.

Along with many other β_{2} agonists, higenamine is prohibited by World Anti-Doping Agency for use in sports. In 2016, French footballer Mamadou Sakho was temporarily banned by UEFA after testing positive for Higenamine causing the player to miss the 2016 Europa League final. The ban was lifted after the player successfully made the mitigating defence that there was an absence of significant negligence as the substance was not on the list of banned substances despite drugs of the same category – β_{2} agonists – being banned.

== Pharmacology ==
Since higenamine is present in plants which have a history of use in traditional medicine, the pharmacology of this compound has attracted scientific interest.

In animal models, higenamine has been demonstrated to be a β_{2} adrenoreceptor agonist. Adrenergic receptors, or adrenoceptors, belong to the class of G protein–coupled receptors, and are the most prominent receptors in the adipose membrane, besides also being expressed in skeletal muscle tissue. These adipose membrane receptors are classified as either α or β adrenoceptors. Although these adrenoceptors share the same messenger, cyclic adenosine monophosphate (cAMP), the specific transduction pathway depends on the receptor type (α or β). Higenamine partly exerts its actions by the activation of an enzyme, adenylate cyclase, responsible for boosting the cellular concentrations of the adrenergic second messenger, cAMP.

In a rodent model, it was found that higenamine produced cardiotonic, vascular relaxation, and bronchodilator effects. In particular, higenamine, via a beta-adrenoceptor mechanism, induced relaxation in rat corpus cavernosum, leading to improved vasodilation and erectile function.

Related to improved vasodilatory signals, higenamine has been shown in animal models to possess antiplatelet and antithrombotic activity via a cAMP-dependent pathway, suggesting higenamine may contribute to enhanced vasodilation and arterial integrity.

In humans, higenamine has been studied as an investigational drug in China for use as a pharmacological agent for cardiac stress tests as well as for treatment of a number of cardiac conditions including bradyarrhythmias. The human trials were relatively small (ranging from 10 to 120 subjects) and higenamine was administered intravenously, most commonly using gradual infusions of 2.5 or 5 mg. Higenamine consistently increased heart rate but had variable effects on blood pressure. One small study described higenamine's effect on cardiac output: higenamine led to an increased ejection fraction in 15 patients with heart disease.

== Toxicity ==
The safety of orally administered higenamine in humans is unknown. During a study of acute toxicity, mice were orally administered the compound at a dose of 2 g per kg of bodyweight. No mice died during the study. In human trials of intravenous higenamine, subjects who received higenamine reported shortness of breath, racing heart, dizziness, headaches, chest tightness.

== Biosynthesis ==
(S)-Norcoclaurine/Higenamine is at the center of benzylisoquinoline alkaloid (BIA) biosynthesis. In spite of large structure diversity, BIAs biosynthesis all share a common first committed intermediate (S)-norcoclaurine. (S)-norcoclaurine is produced by the condensation of two tyrosine derivatives, dopamine and 4-hydroxyphenylacetaldehyde (4-HPAA).

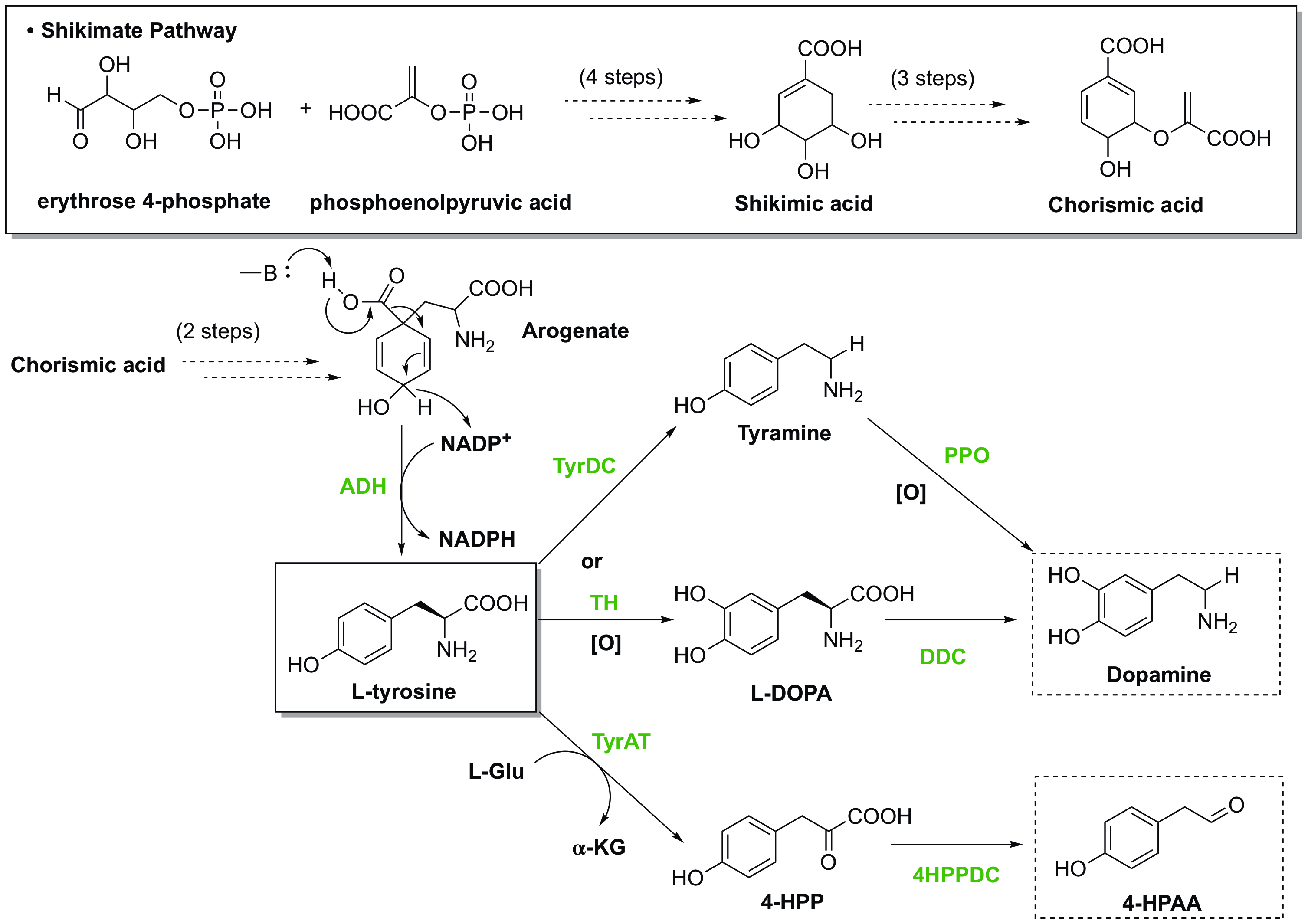
Synthesis of the two substrates: dopamine and 4-HPAA

In plants, tyrosine is synthesized through Shikimate pathway, during which the last step involves decarboxylation and dehydrogenation of arogenate to give L-tyrosine. To generate dopamine from tyrosine, there are two pathways. In one pathway, tyrosine undergoes decarboxylation catalyzed by tyrosine decarboxylase (TyrDC) to become tyramine, which is then followed by oxidation of polyphenol oxidase (PPO) to render dopamine. Alternatively, tyrosine can be oxidized by tyrosine hydroxylase (TH) to form L-DOPA, which is then later decarboxylated by DOPA decarboxylase (DDC) to provide dopamine. Besides that, the other starting material, 4-HPAA, is generated through a first transamination by tyrosine transeaminase (TyrAT) to form 4-hydroxylphenylpyruvate (4-HPP), and a subsequent decarboxylation by 4-HPP decarboxylase.

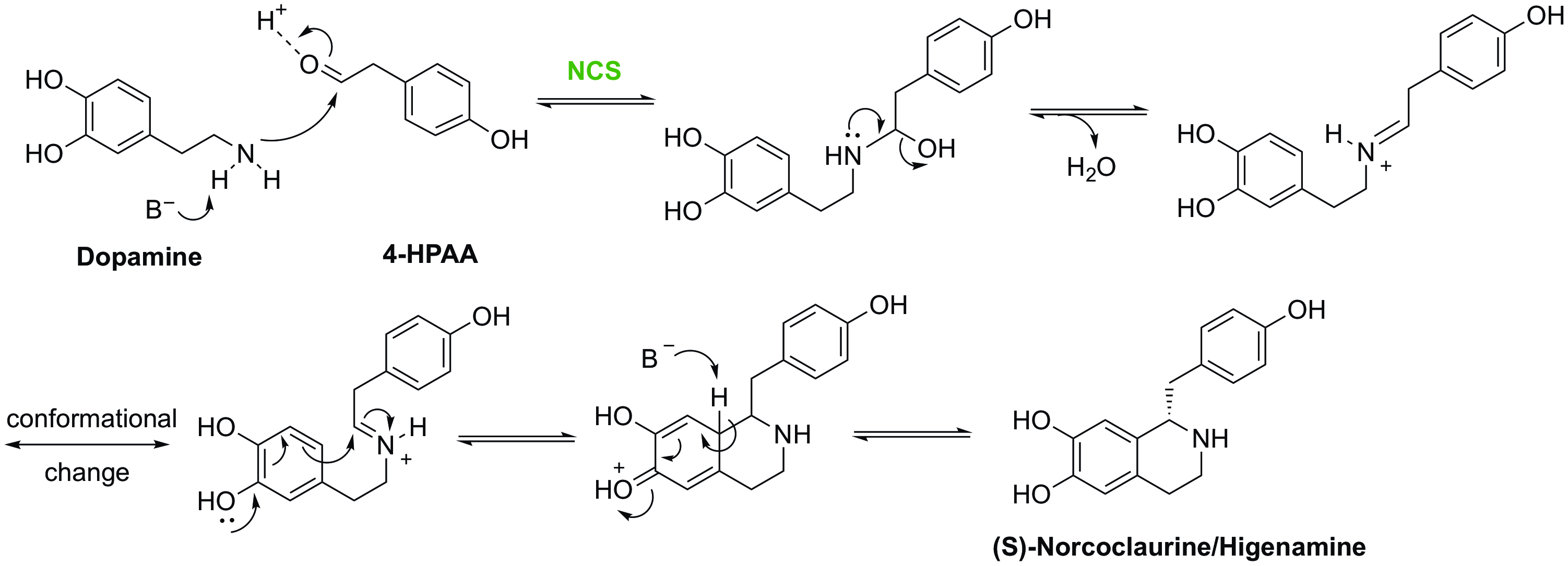
Synthesis of (S)-Higenamine by NCS and its mechanism.

The condensation of dopamine and 4-HPAA to form (S)-norcoclaurine is catalyzed by (S)-norcoclaurine synthase (NCS). Such reaction is one type of Pictet-Spengler reaction. In this reaction, Asp-141 and Glu-110 in the NCS active site are involved in the activation of the amine and carbonyl respectively to facilitate imine formation. Then, the molecule will be cyclized as the mechanism shown below to produce (S)-nococlaurine.

== See also ==
- Papaverine
