= STARD5 =

Protein-coding gene in the species Homo sapiens

Identifiers
- Aliases: STARD5, StAR related lipid transfer domain containing 5
- External IDs: OMIM: 607050; MGI: 2156765; GeneCards: STARD5
Available structures
PDB	Ortholog search: PDBe RCSB
PDB	List of PDB id codes 2R55

Gene location (Human)
Chr.	Chromosome 15 (human)
Band	15q25.1	Start	81,309,053 bp
Band	15q25.1	End	81,324,183 bp

Gene location (Mouse)
Chr.	Chromosome 7 (mouse)
Band	7 D3|7 47.43 cM	Start	83,281,167 bp
Band	7 D3|7 47.43 cM	End	83,302,335 bp
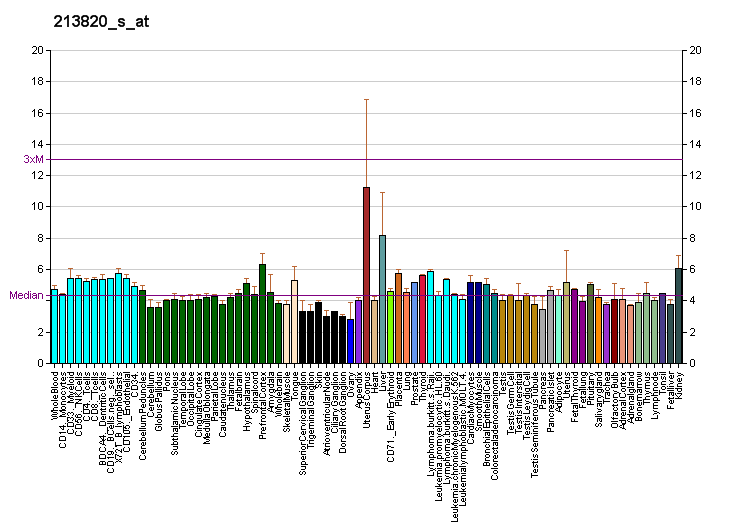
RNA expression pattern
Bgee	Human / Mouse (ortholog); Top expressed in: right lobe of liver; skin of abdomen; skin of leg; ectocervix; mucosa of transverse colon; rectum; vagina; canal of the cervix; body of uterus; skin of thigh / Top expressed in: lip; lacrimal gland; right kidney; proximal tubule; epithelium of small intestine; human kidney; liver; granulocyte; skin of external ear; left lobe of liver; More reference expression data
BioGPS	More reference expression data
Gene ontology
Molecular function	bile acid binding; lipid binding; cholesterol binding; cholesterol transfer activity
Cellular component	cytosol; mitochondrion
Biological process	lipid transport; cholesterol import; bile acid and bile salt transport
Sources:Amigo / QuickGO
Orthologs
Databases	NCBI: entry; OMA: entry
Species	Human	Mouse
Entrez	80765	170460
Ensembl	ENSG00000172345	ENSMUSG00000046027
UniProt	Q9NSY2	Q9EPQ7
RefSeq (mRNA)	NM_030574; NM_181900	NM_023377
RefSeq (protein)	NP_871629	NP_075866
Location (UCSC)	Chr 15: 81.31 – 81.32 Mb	Chr 7: 83.28 – 83.3 Mb
PubMed search
- Wikidata
View/Edit Human	View/Edit Mouse

StAR-related lipid transfer protein 5 is a protein that in humans is encoded by the STARD5 gene. The protein is a 213 amino acids long, consisting almost entirely of a StAR-related transfer (START) domain. It is also part of the StarD4 subfamily of START domain proteins, sharing 34% sequence identity with STARD4.

== Function ==
The protein is most prevalent in the kidney and the liver where it is found in Kupffer cells. STARD5 binds both cholesterol and 25-hydroxycholesterol and appears to function to redistribute cholesterol to the endoplasmic reticulum with which the protein associates and/or the plasma membrane. Increased levels of StarD5 increase free cholesterol in the cell.

Cholesterol homeostasis is regulated, at least in part, by sterol regulatory element (SRE)-binding proteins (e.g., SREBP1) and by liver X receptors (e.g., LXRA). Upon sterol depletion, LXRs are inactive and SREBPs are cleaved, after which they bind promoter SREs and activate genes involved in cholesterol biosynthesis and uptake. Sterol transport is mediated by vesicles or by soluble protein carriers, such as steroidogenic acute regulatory protein (STAR). STAR is homologous to a family of proteins containing a 200- to 210-amino acid STAR-related lipid transfer (START) domain, including STARD5.
