= STARD3NL =

Protein-coding gene in the species Homo sapiens

Identifiers
- Aliases: STARD3NL, MENTHO, STARD3 N-terminal like
- External IDs: OMIM: 611759; MGI: 1923455; GeneCards: STARD3NL

Gene location (Human)
Chr.	Chromosome 7 (human)
Band	7p14.1	Start	38,178,245 bp
Band	7p14.1	End	38,230,670 bp

Gene location (Mouse)
Chr.	Chromosome 13 (mouse)
Band	13|13 A2	Start	19,357,676 bp
Band	13|13 A2	End	19,395,795 bp
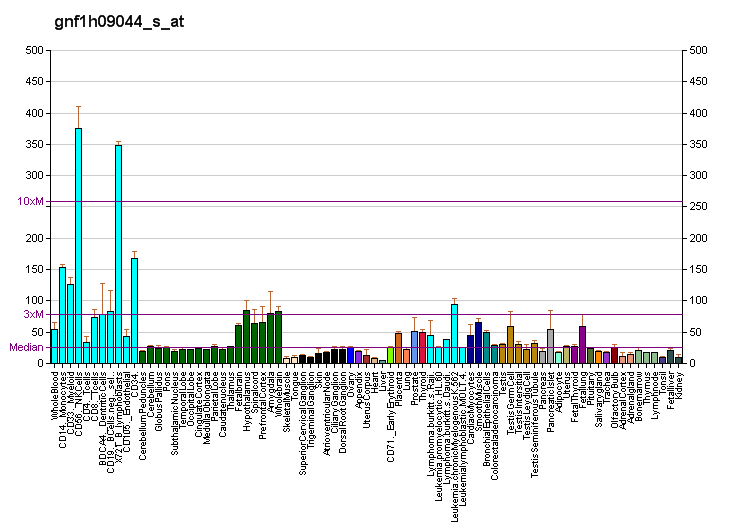
RNA expression pattern
Bgee	Human / Mouse (ortholog); Top expressed in: secondary oocyte; pancreatic epithelial cell; endothelial cell; mucosa of ileum; islet of Langerhans; ganglionic eminence; hypothalamus; C1 segment; ventricular zone; substantia nigra / Top expressed in: basilar part of occipital bone; splanchnocranium; zygote; hyoid bone; right kidney; rib; yolk sac; secondary oocyte; endocardial cushion; seminal vesicula; More reference expression data
BioGPS	More reference expression data
Gene ontology
Molecular function	protein binding; cholesterol binding; protein homodimerization activity
Cellular component	lysosomal membrane; membrane; integral component of membrane; endosome; cytosol; intracellular membrane-bounded organelle; endoplasmic reticulum membrane; late endosome membrane; organelle membrane contact site; endoplasmic reticulum-endosome membrane contact site
Biological process	C21-steroid hormone biosynthetic process; vesicle tethering to endoplasmic reticulum
Sources:Amigo / QuickGO
Orthologs
Databases	NCBI: entry; OMA: entry
Species	Human	Mouse
Entrez	83930	76205
Ensembl	ENSG00000010270	ENSMUSG00000003062
UniProt	O95772	Q9DCI3
RefSeq (mRNA)	NM_032016; NM_001363339; NM_001363340; NM_001363343; NM_001363344 NM_001363345; NM_001363346; NM_001363347	NM_024270; NM_001347485
RefSeq (protein)	NP_114405; NP_001350268; NP_001350269; NP_001350272; NP_001350273 NP_001350274; NP_001350275; NP_001350276	NP_001334414; NP_077232
Location (UCSC)	Chr 7: 38.18 – 38.23 Mb	Chr 13: 19.36 – 19.4 Mb
PubMed search
- Wikidata
View/Edit Human	View/Edit Mouse

MENTHO or STARD3 N-terminal like protein (STARD3NL) is an integral membrane protein of unknown function. As the alternate name implies, MENTHO, short for "MLN64 N-terminal homologue", contains a region in its N-terminus similar to that found in STARD3, also known as MLN64, but lacks the StAR-related transfer domain (START) that characterizes all other proteins given the "STARD" (START domain-containing) name. The N-terminal domain is called a MENTAL (MLN64 N-terminal) domain.

Like MLN64, MENTHO is widely expressed in tissues of the body. Within the cell, it localizes to the membranes of late endosomes and may interact there with MLN64. It is suggested that in combination with MLN64, this protein helps regulate the flow of cholesterol through the endosomal pathway.
