= Bet v I allergen =

Bet v I/Major latex protein
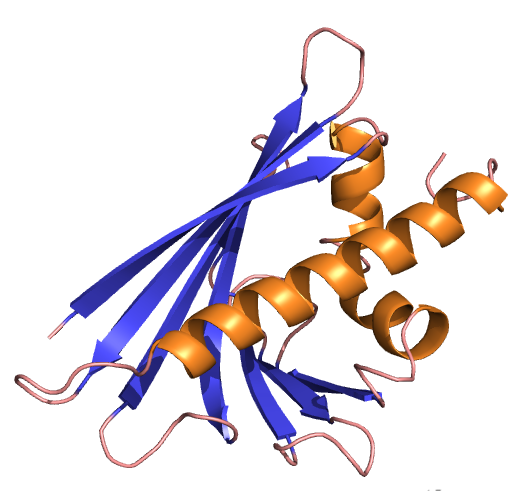
- Birch Pollen Allergen Bet V 1 PDB 1bv1

Identifiers
- Symbol: Bet_v_I
- Pfam: PF00407
- InterPro: IPR000916
- PROSITE: PDOC00437
Available protein structures:
- PDB: IPR000916 PF00407 (ECOD; PDBsum)
- AlphaFold: IPR000916; PF00407

Bet v I/Major latex protein is a protein family consisting of proteins from plants.

Some members are allergens. Allergies are hypersensitivity reactions of the immune system to specific substances called allergens (such as pollen, stings, drugs, or food) that, in most people, result in no symptoms. Trees within the order Fagales possess particularly potent allergens, e.g. the prototypical Bet v 1, the major white birch (Betula verrucosa - now called B. pendula) pollen antigen. Bet v 1 is the main cause of type I allergies observed in early spring. Type I, or immunoglobulin E-mediated (IgE-mediated) allergies affect 1 in 5 people in Europe and North America. Commonly observed symptoms are hay fever, dermatitis, asthma and, in severe cases, anaphylactic shock. First contact with these allergens results in sensitisation; subsequent contact produces a cross-linking reaction of IgE on mast cells and concomitant release of histamine. The inevitable symptoms of an allergic reaction ensue.

The motif (matching the signatures of IPR000916) is also found in non-allergens such as:

- The pathogenesis-related proteins (PRs) of the PR10 family, including:
  - the wound-induced protein AoPR1 from Asparagus officinalis (Garden asparagus);
  - the PRs from Phaseolus vulgaris (Kidney bean) and Petroselinum crispum (Parsley) (PR1-1 and PR1-3);
  - the disease resistance response proteins, STH-2 and STH-21, from Solanum tuberosum (Potato) and pI49, pI176 and DRRG49-C from Pisum sativum (Garden pea);
  - the P. sativum abscisic acid-responsive proteins ABR17 and ABR18;
  - and the stress-induced protein SAM22 from Glycine max (Soybean).
- The legume cytokinin-binding proteins;
- The (S)-norcoclaurine synthase, key to the synthesis of alkaloids such as morphine;
- The major latex proteins and other ripening-related proteins, originally discovered in the opium poppy.

Additionally, the core domain of Bet v 1 founds or is part of a superfamily of domains called SRPBCC (START/RHOalphaC/PITP/Bet v1/CoxG/CalC) that include the StAR-related transfer domain (START), a domain found in humans. This superfamily shares a similar structure and all have large pocket, presumably for binding hydrophobic molecules.

== Allergens ==
A nomenclature system has been established for antigens (allergens) that cause IgE-mediated atopic allergies in humans. This nomenclature system is defined by a designation that is composed of the first three letters of the genus; a space; the first letter of the species name; a space and an Arabic number. In the event that two species names have identical designations, they are discriminated from one another by adding one or more letters (as necessary) to each species designation.

The allergens in this family include allergens with the following designations: Bet v 1 (birch), Dau c 1 (carrot), Pru av 1 (cherry), Ara h 8 (peanut). Other proteins belonging to this family include the major pollen allergens:

- Aln g 1 from Alnus glutinosa (Alder);
- Api G 1 from Apium graveolens (Celery);
- Car b 1 from Carpinus betulus (European hornbeam);
- Cor a 1 from Corylus avellana (European hazel);
- Mal d 1 from Malus domestica (Apple).

== Structure ==
NMR analysis has confirmed earlier predictions of the protein structure and site of the major T-cell epitope. The Bet v 1 protein comprises 6 anti-parallel beta-strands and 3 alpha-helices. Four of the strands dominate the global fold, and 2 of the helices form a C-terminal amphipathic helical motif. This motif is believed to be the T-cell epitope. However, one very striking feature of the three-dimensional structure of Bet v 1 is the presence of a large hydrophobic cavity, which is open to the exterior and probably functions as a ligand binding site.

== Function ==
=== In plants ===
pathogenesis-related (PR) protein in this family are usually expressed upon infections and stressful conditions, implicating a role in host defense. Members and relatives of this family all share a large hydrophobic pocket, indicating an ancestral ligand-binding role.

The biological function of Bet v 1 in particular is still under investigations. Bet v 1 harbors a large hydrophobic pocket and is able to bind a large spectra of ligands in it like hormones and siderophores like flavonols.

=== In animals ===
In vitro, Bet v 1 has been shown to be immune-suppressive, due to its ability to bind to iron-flavonoid complexes, which it can shuttle into human monocytic cells to increase their labile iron pool and stimulate the anti-inflammatory Arylhydrocarbon receptor pathway (https://www.mdpi.com/2076-3921/12/1/42). As such, only without any ligand, Bet v 1 was able to mount a Th2-response and turned into an allergen.
