= Walter L. Miller (endocrinologist) =

American endocrinologist

- Education: Massachusetts Institute of Technology; Duke University School of Medicine
- Scientific career
- Fields: Pediatric endocrinology
- Workplaces: University of California, San Francisco

Walter L. Miller is an American endocrinologist and professor emeritus of pediatrics at the University of California, San Francisco (UCSF). Miller is expert in the field of human steroid biosynthesis and disorders of steroid metabolism. Over the past 40 years Miller's group at UCSF has described molecular basis of several metabolic disorders including, congenital adrenal hyperplasia, pseudo vitamin D dependent rickets, severe, recessive form of Ehlers–Danlos syndrome, 17,20 lyase deficiency caused by CYP17A1 defects, P450scc deficiency caused by CYP11A1 defects, P450 oxidoreductase (Cytochrome P450 reductase) deficiency (also referred as Antley-Bixler syndrome).

Miller has published more than 420 research papers, reviews and book chapters in endocrinology, biochemistry and metabolism. Miller's reviews on the molecular biology of steroid hormone synthesis are among the most widely cited papers in the field.

== Biography ==
=== Research ===
- Miller first achieved international prominence in 1980 for cloning bovine growth hormone and prolactin. This has permitted an increase in milk production worldwide.
- Beginning in 1983, Miller focused on human steroid hormone production and regulation in health and disease. He systematically studied and cloned many genes for enzymes involved in steroid metabolism. Most notable were CYP11A1 (also known as P450scc), which is the initial, rate-limiting enzyme in steroid hormone production from cholesterol and CYP17A1 (also known as P450c17), which catalyzes two distinct enzyme activities, 17-hydroxylase activity which is required for cortisol production and the 17,20 lyase activity, which is required for sex steroid biosynthesis. His laboratory then identified the first mutations that caused isolated 17,20 lyase deficiency. His laboratory also showed that there is post-translational regulation of 17,20 lyase activity by serine phosphorylation and by cytochrome b5, that regulate sex steroid biosynthesis.
- In studies of the common form of congenital adrenal hyperplasia (CAH) caused by 21-hydroxylase deficiency, Miller's group discovered the gene for Tenascin-X, overlapping the CYP21A2 gene. They then discovered a contiguous gene syndrome from a deletion encompassing both CYP21A2 and TNX, causing CAH and Ehlers–Danlos syndrome (EDS). This led to the full description of TNX deficiency as the cause of severe, recessive EDS.
- To enter mitochondria, where the P450scc enzyme resides, cholesterol requires the action of a protein called StAR, (steroidogenic acute regulatory protein), which was first cloned from mice by Dr. Douglas Stocco. Miller's laboratory established the biological role of StAR by identifying human mutations in StAR gene that caused congenital lipoid adrenal hyperplasia. They then showed that StAR acts exclusively on the outer mitochondrial membrane in a 'molten globule' configuration.
- In collaboration with AA Portale, Miller's group was first to clone the vitamin D 1α-hydroxylase (CYP27B1), which is the regulated step in the bioactivation of vitamin D and showed that its mutation causes the genetic form of rickets variously called 'vitamin D-dependent rickets' or 'pseudo vitamin D-deficient rickets.
- In 2004 Miller's laboratory identified the first mutations in human Cytochrome P450 Oxidoreductase (POR), thus describing a new form of congenital adrenal hyperplasia. In a large follow-up study they showed that both POR deficiency and activating mutations of FGFR3 can cause the skeletal malformation syndrome known as Antley–Bixler syndrome (ABS), and that not all patients with POR deficiency have ABS.
- Most recently along with his collaborators in Switzerland, Miller described a novel disorder of fetal androgen synthesis involving aldo-keto reductases (AKR1C2 and AKR1C4), showing that both the conventional and alternative ("backdoor") pathways of androgen synthesis are needed for normal male fetal development.
- In addition to scientific work, Miller has led opposition to the prenatal use of dexamethasone in congenital adrenal hyperplasia (CAH) and has co-authored the clinical practice guidelines for CAH prepared by the Lawson Wilkins Pediatric Endocrine Society and by The Endocrine Society.

=== Awards and honors ===
- Ross Research Award from the Western Society for Pediatric Research (1982)
- Edwin B. Astwood Award from the Endocrine Society (1988)
- Henning Andersen Prize from the European Society for Paediatric Research (1993)
- The Clinical Endocrinology Trust Medal from the British Endocrine Societies (1993)
- Albion O. Bernstein Award from the New York State Medical Society (1993)
- Fellow of the American Association for the Advancement of Science (1994)
- Samuel Rosenthal Foundation Prize for Excellence in Academic Pediatrics (1999)
- Clinical Investigator Award from The Endocrine Society (2006)
- UCSF Distinguished Clinical Research Lectureship (2009)
- Duke University School of Medicine Distinguished Alumnus Award (2010)
- Judson J. VanWyk Prize for Career Achievement, from the Pediatric Endocrine Society (2012)
- International Award, from the European Society for Paediatric Endocrinology (Inaugural recipient, 2012)
- Fred Conrad Koch Lifetime Achievement Award of the Endocrine Society (2017)
