= ACOT12 =

Protein-coding gene in the species Homo sapiens

Identifiers
- Aliases: ACOT12, CACH-1, Cach, STARD15, THEAL, acyl-CoA thioesterase 12
- External IDs: OMIM: 614315; MGI: 1921406; GeneCards: ACOT12
Available structures
PDB	Ortholog search: PDBe RCSB
PDB	List of PDB id codes 3B7K, 4MOB, 4MOC
Enzyme activity
EC #	BRENDA	ExPASy	KEGG	MetaCyc
3.1.2.1	↗	↗	↗	↗

Gene location (Human)
Chr.	Chromosome 5 (human)
Band	5q14.1	Start	81,329,996 bp
Band	5q14.1	End	81,394,179 bp

Gene location (Mouse)
Chr.	Chromosome 13 (mouse)
Band	13|13 C3	Start	91,889,631 bp
Band	13|13 C3	End	91,934,267 bp
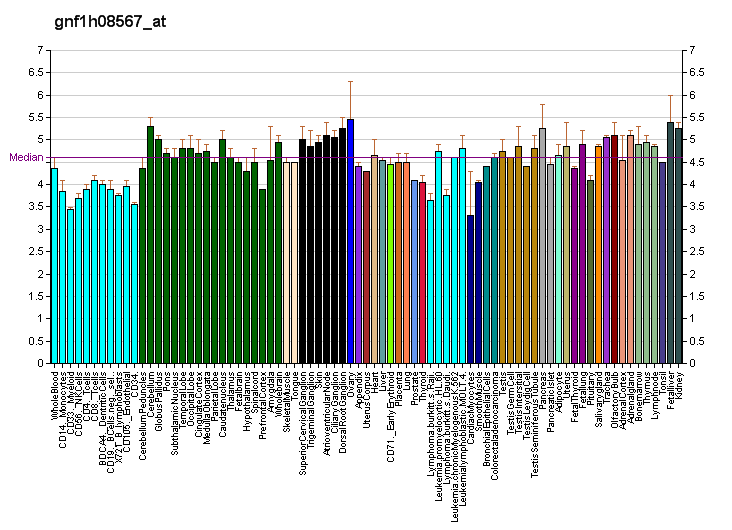
RNA expression pattern
Bgee	Human / Mouse (ortholog); Top expressed in: right lobe of liver; testicle; buccal mucosa cell; human kidney; duodenum; gonad; Achilles tendon; stromal cell of endometrium; hypothalamus; muscle tissue / Top expressed in: right kidney; human kidney; left lobe of liver; proximal tubule; jejunum; intestinal villus; duodenum; seminiferous tubule; epithelium of small intestine; embryo; More reference expression data
BioGPS	More reference expression data
Gene ontology
Molecular function	carboxylic ester hydrolase activity; ATP binding; hydrolase activity; lipid binding; acetyl-CoA hydrolase activity; acyl-CoA hydrolase activity; fatty-acyl-CoA binding; palmitoyl-CoA hydrolase activity; long-chain fatty acyl-CoA binding; thiolester hydrolase activity
Cellular component	cytoplasm; cytosol
Biological process	pyruvate metabolic process; lipid metabolism; acyl-CoA metabolic process; acetyl-CoA metabolic process; fatty acid metabolic process; palmitic acid biosynthetic process
Sources:Amigo / QuickGO
Orthologs
Databases	NCBI: entry; OMA: entry
Species	Human	Mouse
Entrez	134526	74156
Ensembl	ENSG00000172497	ENSMUSG00000021620
UniProt	Q8WYK0	Q9DBK0
RefSeq (mRNA)	NM_130767	NM_028790
RefSeq (protein)	NP_570123	NP_083066
Location (UCSC)	Chr 5: 81.33 – 81.39 Mb	Chr 13: 91.89 – 91.93 Mb
PubMed search
- Wikidata
View/Edit Human	View/Edit Mouse

Acyl-coenzyme A thioesterase 12 or StAR-related lipid transfer protein 15 (STARD15) is an enzyme that in humans is encoded by the ACOT12 gene. The protein contains a StAR-related lipid transfer domain.
