= Star related lipid transfer domain containing 3 =

STARD3

Identifiers
- Aliases: STARD3, CAB1, MLN64, es64, StAR related lipid transfer domain containing 3
- External IDs: OMIM: 607048; MGI: 1929618; GeneCards: STARD3
Available structures
PDB	Ortholog search: PDBe RCSB
PDB	List of PDB id codes 1EM2, 5I9J

Gene location (Human)
Chr.	Chromosome 17 (human)
Band	17q12	Start	39,637,090 bp
Band	17q12	End	39,664,201 bp

Gene location (Mouse)
Chr.	Chromosome 11 (mouse)
Band	11|11 D	Start	98,249,194 bp
Band	11|11 D	End	98,271,938 bp
RNA expression pattern
Bgee	Human / Mouse (ortholog); Top expressed in: right lung; granulocyte; tibial nerve; right adrenal cortex; left adrenal cortex; upper lobe of left lung; right uterine tube; canal of the cervix; stromal cell of endometrium; anterior pituitary / Top expressed in: granulocyte; saccule; ectoderm; otic vesicle; otic placode; choroid plexus of fourth ventricle; vestibular membrane of cochlear duct; yolk sac; Ileal epithelium; right kidney; More reference expression data
BioGPS	n/a
Gene ontology
Molecular function	lipid binding; protein binding; cholesterol binding; cholesterol transfer activity; protein homodimerization activity
Cellular component	cytoplasm; integral component of membrane; lysosomal membrane; endosome; membrane; late endosome; cytosol; mitochondrion; endoplasmic reticulum membrane; late endosome membrane; organelle membrane contact site; endoplasmic reticulum-endosome membrane contact site
Biological process	steroid metabolic process; progesterone biosynthetic process; lipid transport; cholesterol metabolic process; mitochondrial transport; lipid metabolism; C21-steroid hormone biosynthetic process; cholesterol transport; vesicle tethering to endoplasmic reticulum; transport
Sources:Amigo / QuickGO
Orthologs
Databases	NCBI: entry; OMA: entry
Species	Human	Mouse
Entrez	10948	59045
Ensembl	ENSG00000131748	ENSMUSG00000018167
UniProt	Q14849	Q61542
RefSeq (mRNA)	NM_001165937; NM_001165938; NM_006804	NM_021547
RefSeq (protein)	NP_001159409; NP_001159410; NP_006795	NP_067522
Location (UCSC)	Chr 17: 39.64 – 39.66 Mb	Chr 11: 98.25 – 98.27 Mb
PubMed search
- Wikidata
View/Edit Human	View/Edit Mouse

StAR related lipid transfer domain containing 3 (STARD3) is a protein that in humans is encoded by the STARD3 gene. STARD3 also known as metastatic lymph node 64 protein (MLN64) is a late endosomal integral membrane protein involved in cholesterol transport. STARD3 creates membrane contact sites between the endoplasmic reticulum (ER) and late endosomes where it moves cholesterol.

== Function ==
This gene encodes a member of a subfamily of lipid trafficking proteins that are characterized by a C-terminal steroidogenic acute regulatory domain and an N-terminal metastatic lymph node 64 domain. The encoded protein localizes to the membranes of late endosomes and may be involved in exporting cholesterol. Alternative splicing results in multiple transcript variants.[provided by RefSeq, Oct 2009].

STARD3 is involved in cholesterol transport from the ER to late endosomes where the protein is anchored. It forms a complex with fellow late endosomal protein STARD3 N-terminal-like protein (STARD3NL) also known as MLN64 N-terminal homologue (MENTHO) and ER VAMP-associated proteins (VAP proteins) A and B (VAP-A, VAP-B) to tether the two organelles together. For STARD3, this interaction is regulated by phosphorylation of a serine in its FFAT motif.

The closest homolog to STARD3 is the steroidogenic acute regulatory protein (StAR/StarD1), which initiates the production of steroids by moving cholesterol inside the mitochondrion. Thus, MLN64 is also proposed to move cholesterol inside the mitochondria under certain conditions to initiate StAR-independent steroidogenesis, such as in the human placenta which lacks StAR yet produces steroids. This functional role is supported by evidence that MLN64 expression can stimulate steroid production in a model cell system.

One study indicates that this protein also specifically binds lutein in the retina.

== Structure ==
STARD3 is a multi-domain protein composed of a N-terminal MENTAL (MLN64 N-terminal) domain, a central phospho-FFAT motif (two phenylalanines in an acidic tract), and a C-terminal StAR-related transfer domain (START) lipid transport domain.

The MENTAL domain of STARD3 is similar to the protein STARD3 N-terminal like protein (STARD3NL) also known as MLN64 N-terminal homologue (MENTHO). This domain is composed of 4 transmembrane helices which anchor the protein in the limiting membrane of late endosomes. This domain binds cholesterol and associates with the same domain in STARD3NL.

The phospho-FFAT motif is a short protein sequence motif which binds to the ER proteins VAP-A, VAP-B and MOSPD2 proteins after phosphorylation.

The START domain of STARD3 is homologous to the StAR protein. X-ray crystallography of the C-terminus indicates that this domain forms a pocket that can bind cholesterol. This places STARD3 within the StarD1/D3 subfamily of START domain-containing proteins.

== Tissue distribution ==
STARD3 is expressed in all tissues in the body at various levels. In the brain, MLN64 is detectable in many but not all cells. Many malignant tumors highly express STARD3 as a result of its gene being part of a Her2/erbB2-containing gene locus that is amplified.

== Pathology ==
Loss of STARD3 has little effect in mice. At the cellular level, changes in STARD3 can disrupt trafficking of endosomes and cause accumulation of cholesterol in late endosomes.
