= MENTAL domain =

Identifiers
- Symbol: MENTAL
- Pfam: PF10457
- InterPro: IPR019498
- PROSITE: PS51439
Available protein structures:
- Pfam: structures / ECOD
- PDB: RCSB PDB; PDBe; PDBj
- PDBsum: structure summary

The MENTAL or MLN64 NH_{2}-terminal domain is a membrane-spanning domain that is conserved in two late endosomal proteins in vertebrates, MLN64 and MENTHO. The domain is 170 amino acids long.

Current data indicates that this domain allows for dimerization between MLN64 and MENTHO molecules and with themselves. The domain may also direct cholesterol transport.
