= HSPC =

HSPC may refer to:

- Hematopoietic stem and progenitor cell (more commonly HSC)
- hormone sensitive prostate cancer
- Hydrogenated soybean phosphatidylcholine
- Heat shock protein C (hspC)
