= Phosphatidylinositol transfer protein =

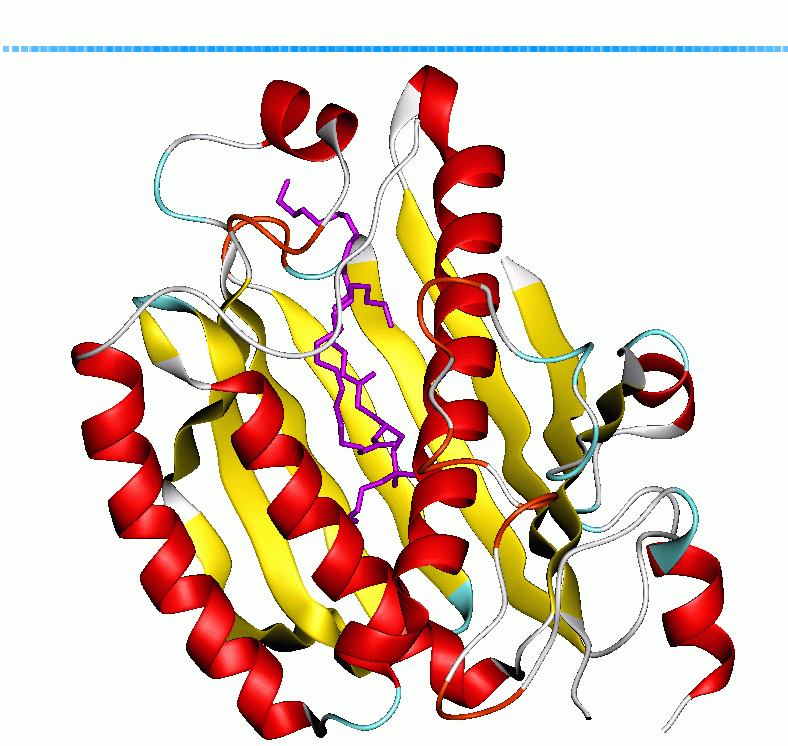
- Phosphatidylinositol transfer protein, beta isoform

Identifiers
- Symbol: IP_trans
- Pfam: PF02121
- InterPro: IPR001666
- SCOP2: 1fvz / SCOPe / SUPFAM
- OPM superfamily: 138
- OPM protein: 2a1l
- CDD: cd07815
Available protein structures:
- PDB: IPR001666 PF02121 (ECOD; PDBsum)
- AlphaFold: IPR001666; PF02121

Phosphatidylinositol transfer protein (PITP) or priming in exocytosis protein 3 (PEP3) is a ubiquitous cytosolic domain involved in transport of phospholipids from their site of synthesis in the endoplasmic reticulum and Golgi to other cell membranes.

== Biological function ==
PITP has been also shown to be an essential component of the polyphosphoinositide synthesis machinery and is hence required for proper signalling by epidermal growth factor and f-Met-Leu-Phe, as well as for exocytosis. The role of PITP in polyphosphoinositide synthesis may also explain its involvement in intracellular vesicular traffic.

== Structure and evolution ==
Along with the structurally unrelated Sec14p family (found in Pfam PF00650), this family can bind/exchange one molecule of phosphatidylinositol (PI) or phosphatidylcholine (PC) and thus aids their transfer between different membrane compartments. There are three sub-families - all share an N-terminal PITP-like domain, whose sequence is highly conserved. It is described as consisting of three regions. The N-terminal region is thought to bind the lipid and contains two helices and an eight-stranded, mostly antiparallel beta-sheet. An intervening loop region, which is thought to play a role in protein-protein interactions, separates this from the C-terminal region, which exhibits the greatest sequence variation and may be involved in membrane binding. This motif marks PITP as part of the larger SRPBCC (START/RHOalphaC/PITP/Bet v1/CoxG/CalC) domain superfamily.

PITP alpha (UniProt Q00169) has a 16-fold greater affinity for PI than PC. Together with PITP beta (UniProt P48739), it is expressed ubiquitously in all tissues.

== Human proteins ==
The family of human phosphatidylinositol transfer proteins has several members:

- Phosphatidylinositol transfer protein, alpha (PITPNA)
- Phosphatidylinositol transfer protein, beta (PITPNB)
- Phosphatidylinositol transfer protein, cytoplasmic 1 (PITPNC)
- Phosphatidylinositol transfer protein, membrane-associated 1 (PITPNM1)
- Phosphatidylinositol transfer protein, membrane-associated 2 (PITPNM2)
- PITPNM family member 3 (PITPNM3)
