= Ceramide transfer protein =

Protein found in humans

CERT1
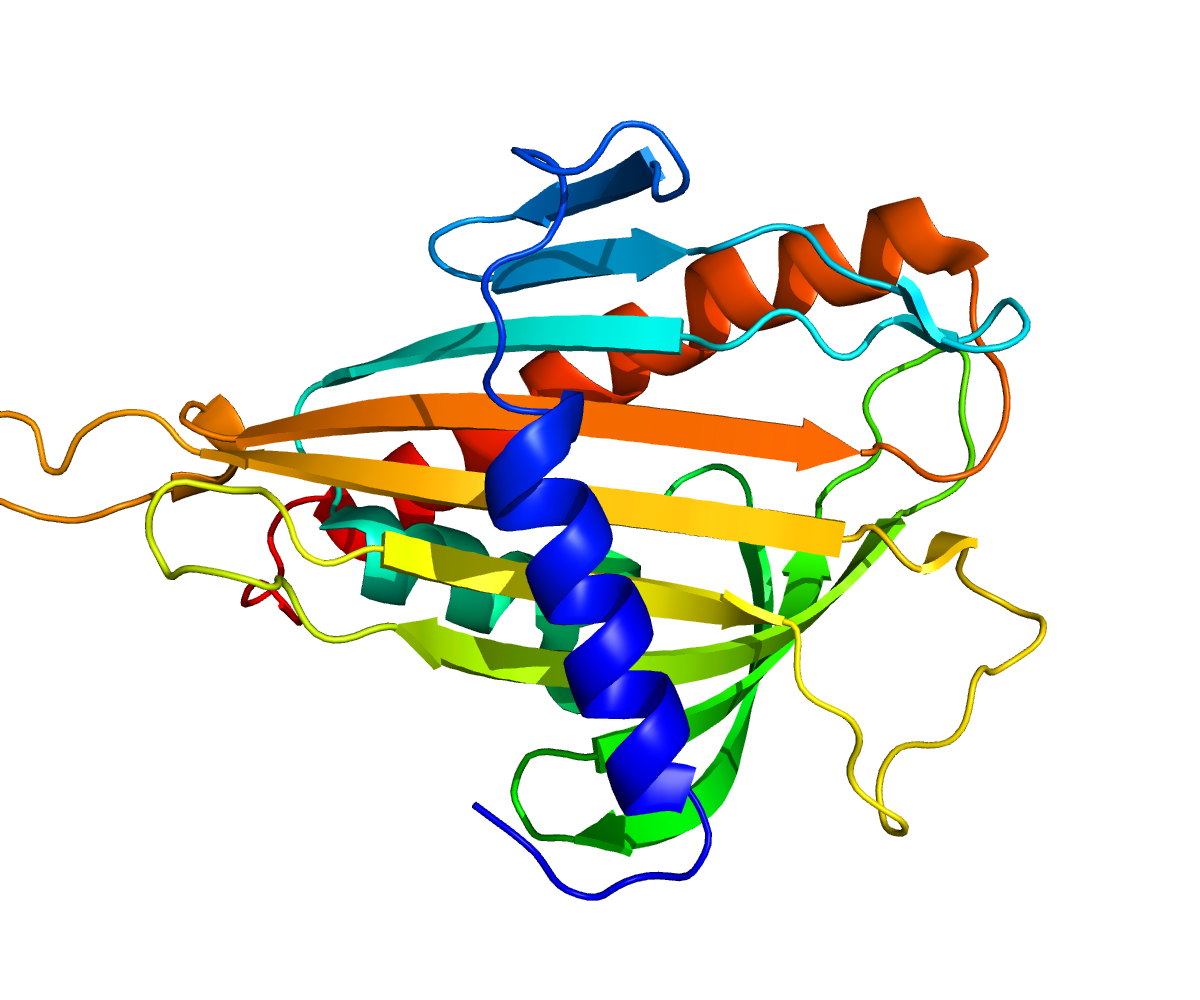

Identifiers
- Aliases: CERT1, CERT, CERTL, GPBP, STARD11, MRD34, collagen type IV alpha 3 binding protein, COL4A3BP, ceramide transporter 1
- External IDs: OMIM: 604677; MGI: 1915268; GeneCards: CERT1
Available structures
PDB	Ortholog search: PDBe RCSB
PDB	List of PDB id codes 2E3M, 2E3N, 2E3O, 2E3P, 2E3Q, 2E3R, 2E3S, 2RSG, 2Z9Y, 2Z9Z, 3H3Q, 3H3R, 3H3S, 3H3T, 4HHV

Gene location (Human)
Chr.	Chromosome 5 (human)
Band	5q13.3	Start	75,356,345 bp
Band	5q13.3	End	75,512,138 bp

Gene location (Mouse)
Chr.	Chromosome 13 (mouse)
Band	13|13 D1	Start	96,679,126 bp
Band	13|13 D1	End	96,776,675 bp
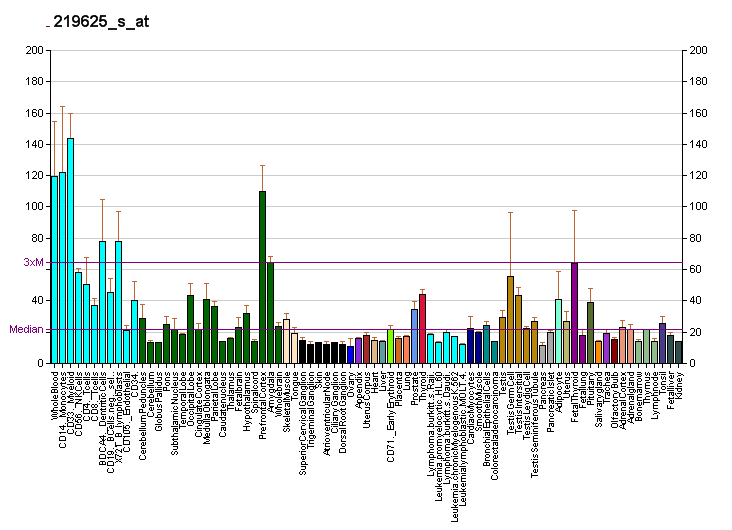
RNA expression pattern
Bgee	Human / Mouse (ortholog); Top expressed in: sperm; cerebellar vermis; internal globus pallidus; pars reticulata; pars compacta; tendon of biceps brachii; gonad; testicle; pons; monocyte / Top expressed in: substantia nigra; Epithelium of choroid plexus; supraoptic nucleus; retinal pigment epithelium; trigeminal ganglion; iris; medial vestibular nucleus; sciatic nerve; zygote; pontine nuclei; More reference expression data
BioGPS	More reference expression data
Gene ontology
Molecular function	phosphatidylinositol-4-phosphate binding; protein binding; ceramide binding; lipid binding; ceramide transfer activity; kinase activity; ceramide 1-phosphate binding; ceramide 1-phosphate transfer activity
Cellular component	cytoplasm; Golgi apparatus; endoplasmic reticulum membrane; nucleoplasm; endoplasmic reticulum; perinuclear region of cytoplasm; intracellular anatomical structure; cytosol; mitochondrion; membrane
Biological process	lipid transport; sphingolipid biosynthetic process; immune response; ER to Golgi ceramide transport; intermembrane sphingolipid transfer; cell morphogenesis; in utero embryonic development; heart morphogenesis; ceramide metabolic process; muscle contraction; endoplasmic reticulum organization; signal transduction; cell population proliferation; phosphorylation; response to endoplasmic reticulum stress; ceramide transport; lipid homeostasis; mitochondrion morphogenesis; intermembrane lipid transfer; ceramide 1-phosphate transport
Sources:Amigo / QuickGO
Orthologs
Databases	NCBI: entry; OMA: entry
Species	Human	Mouse
Entrez	10087	68018
Ensembl	ENSG00000113163	ENSMUSG00000021669
UniProt	Q9Y5P4	Q9EQG9
RefSeq (mRNA)	NM_001130105; NM_005713; NM_031361; NM_001379002; NM_001379003 NM_001379004; NM_001379029	NM_001164222; NM_023420
RefSeq (protein)	NP_001123577; NP_005704; NP_112729; NP_001365931; NP_001365932 NP_001365933; NP_001365958	NP_001157694; NP_075909
Location (UCSC)	Chr 5: 75.36 – 75.51 Mb	Chr 13: 96.68 – 96.78 Mb
PubMed search
- Wikidata
View/Edit Human	View/Edit Mouse

Ceramide transfer protein (CERT), also known as STARD11, is a protein that in humans is encoded by the CERT1 gene (previously COL4A3BP). The protein contains a pleckstrin homology domain at its amino terminus and a START domain towards the end of the molecule. It is a member of the StarD2 subfamily of START domain proteins.

== Function and structure ==
Ceramide transferase protein (or CERT) is responsible for the transfer of ceramide from the endoplasmic reticulum (ER) to the Golgi apparatus. Ceramide plays a very important role in the metabolism and biosynthesis of sphingolipid. More specifically, it is synthesized at the ER, then is transferred by CERT to Golgi where it is converted to sphingomyelin (SM).

There are two pathways through which this transfer takes place: a major pathway, which is ATP and cytosol-dependent and a minor pathway, which is ATP- and cytosol-independent.

CERT is a 68kDa protein that consists of three different parts, each of which with a special role:

1. Pleckstrin homology domain (PH): It is the aminoterminal domain and it consists of about 100 aminoacid residues. The main function of this part of CERT is to recognize and bind various phosphatidylinositol phosphates (PIPs) with different level of specificity. The isomers of PIPs are distributed to various organelles: PI-4,5-diphosphate goes to the plasma membrane, PI-3-monophosphate to endosomes and PI-4-monophosphate to Golgi. PH domain of wild-type CERT has been found to recognize specifically PI4P and therefore CERT targets the Golgi apparatus or the trans-Golgi network.
2. START domain: It consists of about 210 amino acid residues and has an important role in the transfer of ceramide, which is that it can recognize specifically only the natural D-erythro isomer of ceramide and extract it from the membrane.
3. FFAT motif (two phenylalanines in an acidic tract, that has a conserved sequence "EFFDAxE"): It is a short domain situated between PH and START domain and is the one responsible for the interaction of CERT with ER. More specifically, it binds to the ER resident type II membrane protein, vesicle-associated membrane protein (VAMP) associated protein (VAP), an interaction that is necessary for the transfer of ceramide from the ER to Golgi.

All of these domains are important for the transfer of ceramide, since first of all CERT will extract newly synthesized ceramide from the membrane with the help of its START domain. Then, ceramide will be transferred through the cytosol towards Golgi because of the interaction between the PH domain and PI4P. Finally, interaction with ER is facilitated through the binding of the FFAT motif with vesicle-associated membrane protein.

== Regulation ==
The transport of ceramide by CERT requires ATP. CERT – when expressed in mammalian cells – has been found to receive a lot of possible phosphorylations at the serine repeat (SR) motif, which is close to the PH domain.

It has been shown that the phosphorylation of this SR motif leads to inactivation of the PI4P-binding and ceramide transferring activities of CERT, since it induces an autoinhibitory reaction between the PH and START domains of CERT, transforming it from the active form to the inactive form.

Protein kinase D (PKD) has been found to phosphorylate the SR motif of CERT. Also, CERT is further phosphorylated by the casein kinase 1 family leading to hyperphosphorylation of the SR motif. On the other hand, the integral membrane protein protein phosphatase 2Cε (PP2Cε), which is located on the endoplasmic reticulum induces dephosphorylation of CERT. Dephosphorylated CERT is in the active form in order to be functional and transfer ceramide from ER to Golgi.

== Inhibitor HPA-12 ==
The chemically synthesized compound N-(30hydroxy-1-hydroxymethyl-3-phenylpropyl)dodecamide (HPA-12) has been found to be an inhibitor of CERT-mediated ceramide trafficking. More specifically, this drug inhibits the ATP-dependent transport of ceramide from ER to Golgi (and therefore the conversion of ceramide to sphingomyelin), but it does not inhibit protein trafficking. This suggests that Ceramide is still transformed to Glycosylceramide at Golgi. Moreover, it has been shown that it does not inhibit the Sphingomyelin synthase in vitro or in vivo. Moreover, only the (1R, 3R) isomer of HPA-12 has been found to be an active inhibitor and the length of the chain as well as the two hydroxyl-groups are very important for the inhibitory activity.

== Clinical significance ==
This gene encodes a kinase also known as Goodpasture antigen-binding protein that specifically phosphorylates the N-terminal region of the non-collagenous domain of the alpha 3 chain of type IV collagen, known as the Goodpasture antigen. Goodpasture's syndrome is the result of an autoimmune response directed at this antigen. One isoform of this protein is also involved in ceramide intracellular transport. Two transcripts exist for this gene.
