= Phosphatidylinositol transfer protein, cytoplasmic 1 =

Protein-coding gene in the species Homo sapiens

PITPNC1

Identifiers
- Aliases: PITPNC1, M-RDGB-beta, MRDGBbeta, RDGB-BETA, RDGBB, RDGBB1, phosphatidylinositol transfer protein, cytoplasmic 1, phosphatidylinositol transfer protein cytoplasmic 1
- External IDs: OMIM: 605134; MGI: 1919045; HomoloGene: 8241; GeneCards: PITPNC1; OMA:PITPNC1 - orthologs

Gene location (Human)
Chr.	Chromosome 17 (human)
Band	17q24.2	Start	67,377,281 bp
Band	17q24.2	End	67,697,256 bp

Gene location (Mouse)
Chr.	Chromosome 11 (mouse)
Band	11|11 E1	Start	107,098,718 bp
Band	11|11 E1	End	107,361,525 bp
RNA expression pattern
Bgee	Human / Mouse (ortholog); Top expressed in: endothelial cell; cartilage tissue; Brodmann area 23; lateral nuclear group of thalamus; dorsal motor nucleus of vagus nerve; middle temporal gyrus; parotid gland; palpebral conjunctiva; islet of Langerhans; granulocyte / Top expressed in: lateral geniculate nucleus; saccule; medial dorsal nucleus; retinal pigment epithelium; medial geniculate nucleus; mammillary body; triceps brachii muscle; lumbar spinal ganglion; pontine nuclei; sternocleidomastoid muscle; More reference expression data
BioGPS	n/a
Gene ontology
Molecular function	protein binding; lipid binding; phosphatidylcholine transporter activity; phosphatidylinositol transfer activity; phosphatidylinositol binding; phosphatidic acid binding; phosphatidylglycerol binding; phospholipid transporter activity
Cellular component	cytoplasm; intracellular anatomical structure; nucleoplasm; cytosol
Biological process	lipid transport; signal transduction; phospholipid transport
Sources:Amigo / QuickGO
Orthologs
Species	Human	Mouse
Entrez	26207	71795
Ensembl	ENSG00000154217	ENSMUSG00000040430
UniProt	Q9UKF7	Q8K4R4
RefSeq (mRNA)	NM_012417; NM_181671	NM_145823; NM_001359616
RefSeq (protein)	NP_036549; NP_858057	NP_665822; NP_001346545
Location (UCSC)	Chr 17: 67.38 – 67.7 Mb	Chr 11: 107.1 – 107.36 Mb
PubMed search
- Wikidata
View/Edit Human	View/Edit Mouse

Phosphatidylinositol transfer protein, cytoplasmic 1 is a protein that in humans is encoded by the PITPNC1 gene.

== Function ==
This gene encodes a member of the phosphatidylinositol transfer protein family. The encoded cytoplasmic protein plays a role in multiple processes including cell signaling and lipid metabolism by facilitating the transfer of phosphatidylinositol between membrane compartments. Alternatively spliced transcript variants encoding multiple isoforms have been observed for this gene, and a pseudogene of this gene is located on the long arm of chromosome 1. [provided by RefSeq, May 2012].
