= Phosphatidylinositol transfer protein, alpha =

Protein-coding gene in the species Homo sapiens

PITPNA
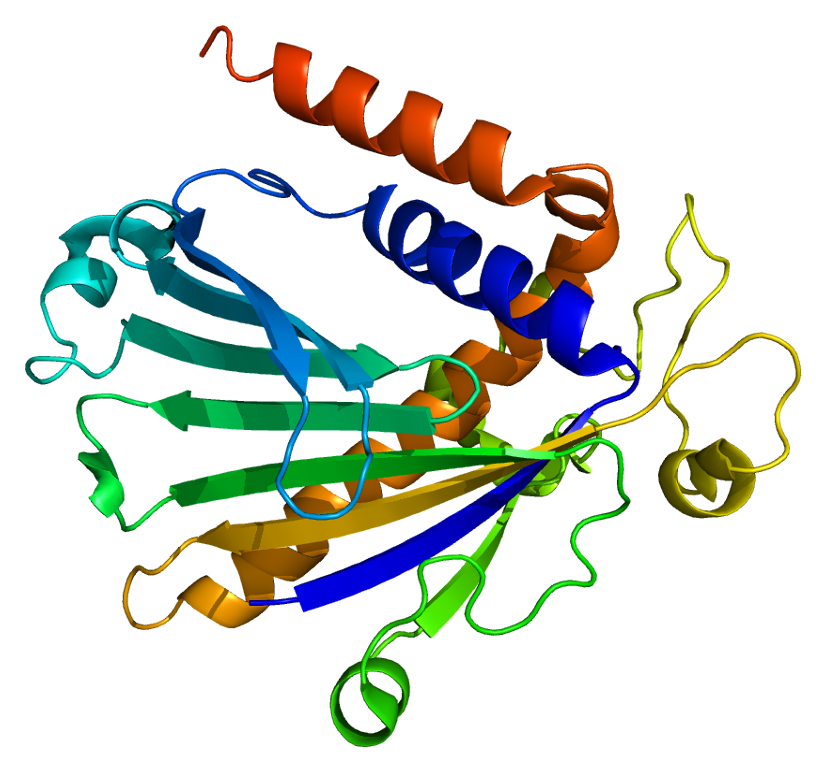
Available structures
| PDB | Ortholog search: PDBe RCSB |
| PDB | List of PDB id codes 1UW5 |

Identifiers
- Aliases: PITPNA, HEL-S-36, PI-TPalpha, PITPN, VIB1A, phosphatidylinositol transfer protein alpha
- External IDs: OMIM: 600174; MGI: 99887; HomoloGene: 55958; GeneCards: PITPNA; OMA:PITPNA - orthologs

Gene location (Human)
| Chr. | Chromosome 17 (human) |
| Band | 17p13.3 | Start | 1,517,718 bp |
| Band | 17p13.3 | End | 1,562,792 bp |

Gene location (Mouse)
| Chr. | Chromosome 11 (mouse) |
| Band | 11 B5|11 45.92 cM | Start | 75,478,923 bp |
| Band | 11 B5|11 45.92 cM | End | 75,519,630 bp |
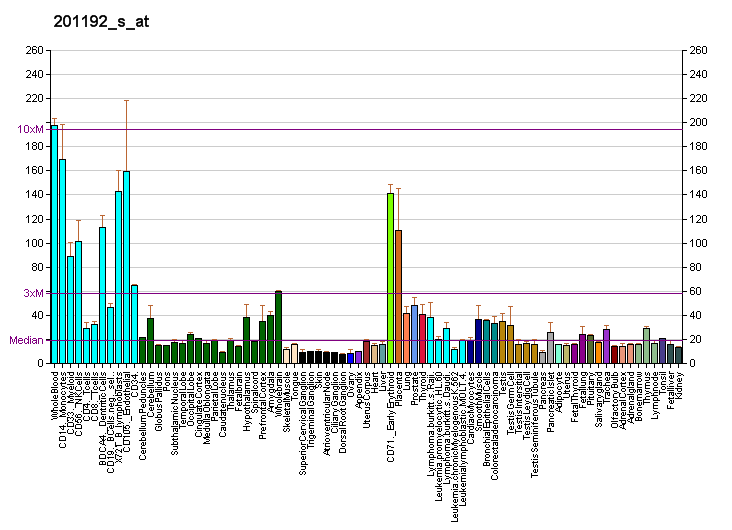

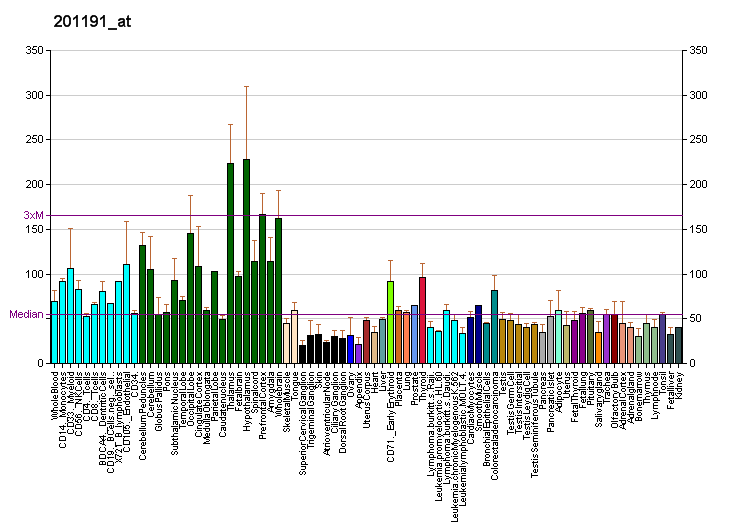

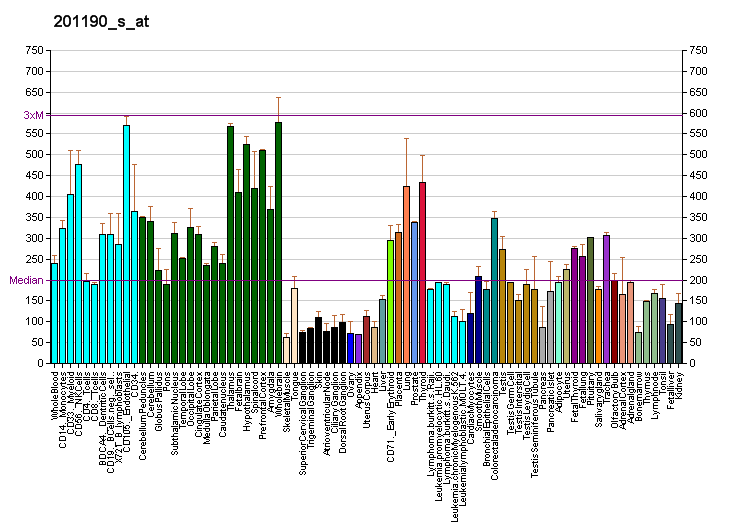
RNA expression pattern
| Bgee | Human / Mouse (ortholog); Top expressed in: retinal pigment epithelium; parotid gland; pons; lateral nuclear group of thalamus; skin of leg; skin of abdomen; monocyte; minor salivary glands; prefrontal cortex; mucosa of esophagus / Top expressed in: retinal pigment epithelium; stroma of bone marrow; dentate gyrus of hippocampal formation granule cell; pontine nuclei; superior frontal gyrus; medial vestibular nucleus; cerebellar cortex; granulocyte; ileum; jejunum; More reference expression data |
| BioGPS | More reference expression data |
Gene ontology
| Molecular function | lipid binding; phosphatidylcholine transporter activity; phosphatidylinositol transfer activity; phosphatidylcholine binding; phosphatidylinositol binding; phosphatidylglycerol binding; phospholipid transporter activity |
| Cellular component | cytoplasm; myelin sheath; extracellular exosome; intracellular anatomical structure; cytosol |
| Biological process | visual perception; lipid metabolism; axonogenesis; phospholipid transport; interleukin-12-mediated signaling pathway; transport |
Sources:Amigo / QuickGO
Orthologs
| Species | Human | Mouse |
| Entrez | 5306 | 18738 |
| Ensembl | ENSG00000174238 | ENSMUSG00000017781 |
| UniProt | Q00169 | P53810 |
| RefSeq (mRNA) | NM_006224 | NM_008850 |
| RefSeq (protein) | NP_006215 | NP_032876 |
| Location (UCSC) | Chr 17: 1.52 – 1.56 Mb | Chr 11: 75.48 – 75.52 Mb |
| PubMed search |
- Wikidata
| View/Edit Human | View/Edit Mouse |

Phosphatidylinositol transfer protein alpha isoform is a protein that in humans is encoded by the PITPNA gene.

Phosphatidylinositol transfer proteins are a diverse set of cytosolic phospholipid transfer proteins that are distinguished by their ability to transfer phospholipids between membranes in vitro (Wirtz, 1991).
