= STARD7 =

Protein-coding gene in the species Homo sapiens

Identifiers
- Aliases: STARD7, GTT1, StAR related lipid transfer domain containing 7, FAME2
- External IDs: OMIM: 616712; MGI: 2139090; GeneCards: STARD7

Gene location (Human)
Chr.	Chromosome 2 (human)
Band	2q11.2	Start	96,184,859 bp
Band	2q11.2	End	96,208,827 bp

Gene location (Mouse)
Chr.	Chromosome 2 (mouse)
Band	2 F1|2 61.88 cM	Start	127,112,138 bp
Band	2 F1|2 61.88 cM	End	127,140,852 bp
RNA expression pattern
Bgee	Human / Mouse (ortholog); Top expressed in: secondary oocyte; internal globus pallidus; deltoid muscle; tibialis anterior muscle; Skeletal muscle tissue of biceps brachii; quadriceps femoris muscle; vastus lateralis muscle; optic nerve; Epithelium of choroid plexus; cerebellar vermis / Top expressed in: neural layer of retina; parotid gland; digastric muscle; atrioventricular valve; endocardial cushion; ankle; atrium; lacrimal gland; temporal muscle; medial ganglionic eminence; More reference expression data
BioGPS	n/a
Gene ontology
Molecular function	lipid binding; phospholipid transporter activity
Cellular component	mitochondrion; mitochondrial outer membrane
Biological process	phosphatidylcholine biosynthetic process; phospholipid transport
Sources:Amigo / QuickGO
Orthologs
Databases	NCBI: entry; OMA: entry
Species	Human	Mouse
Entrez	56910	99138
Ensembl	ENSG00000084090	ENSMUSG00000027367
UniProt	Q9NQZ5	Q8R1R3
RefSeq (mRNA)	NM_020151; NM_139267; NM_001385622	NM_139308; NM_001362684
RefSeq (protein)	NP_064536	NP_647469; NP_001349613
Location (UCSC)	Chr 2: 96.18 – 96.21 Mb	Chr 2: 127.11 – 127.14 Mb
PubMed search
- Wikidata
View/Edit Human	View/Edit Mouse

StAR-related lipid transfer domain protein 7 (STARD7) or gestational trophoblastic tumor gene-1 (GTT1) is a lipid transporter that specifically binds and transports phosphatidylcholine between membranes.

== Function and tissue distribution ==
StarD7 is found in the cytosol and associated with the mitochondrion. When overproduced in the cell, mitochondrial levels of phosphatidylcholine rise. High levels of the protein are found in tumor cells compared to normal cells, suggesting a role in cell proliferation.

== Structure ==
There are two forms of StarD7: StarD7-I and StarD7-II. The former is 295 amino acids long. StarD7-I possesses an additional 75 amino acids at its amino-terminus, which form a signaling sequence that targets it to the outer membrane of the mitochondrion.

StarD7 contains a StAR-related transfer domain (START), from which it derives its name. Moreover, the protein is a member of the predominantly phosphatidylcholine transporter subfamily of START proteins, the StarD2 subfamily. It shares 25% sequence identity with StarD2.
