= STARD4 =

Protein-coding gene in the species Homo sapiens

Identifiers
- Aliases: STARD4, StAR related lipid transfer domain containing 4
- External IDs: OMIM: 607049; MGI: 2156764; GeneCards: STARD4

Gene location (Human)
Chr.	Chromosome 5 (human)
Band	5q22.1	Start	111,496,033 bp
Band	5q22.1	End	111,512,590 bp

Gene location (Mouse)
Chr.	Chromosome 18 (mouse)
Band	18 B1|18 18.18 cM	Start	33,332,408 bp
Band	18 B1|18 18.18 cM	End	33,346,915 bp
RNA expression pattern
Bgee	Human / Mouse (ortholog); Top expressed in: mucosa of ileum; jejunal mucosa; duodenum; right hemisphere of cerebellum; rectum; right lung; appendix; islet of Langerhans; upper lobe of left lung; pancreatic ductal cell / Top expressed in: crypt of lieberkuhn of small intestine; epithelium of small intestine; left colon; ileum; intestinal villus; jejunum; migratory enteric neural crest cell; left lung lobe; pineal gland; left lobe of liver; More reference expression data
BioGPS	n/a
Gene ontology
Molecular function	lipid binding; cholesterol binding; cholesterol transfer activity
Cellular component	mitochondrion; cytoplasmic vesicle
Biological process	lipid transport; positive regulation of cholesterol esterification; cholesterol import; positive regulation of bile acid biosynthetic process; cholesterol transport involved in cholesterol storage; intracellular cholesterol transport
Sources:Amigo / QuickGO
Orthologs
Databases	NCBI: entry; OMA: entry
Species	Human	Mouse
Entrez	134429	170459
Ensembl	ENSG00000164211	ENSMUSG00000024378
UniProt	Q96DR4	Q99JV5
RefSeq (mRNA)	NM_001308056; NM_001308057; NM_001308058; NM_001308059; NM_001308060 NM_001308061; NM_139164	NM_133774; NM_001347624; NM_180986
RefSeq (protein)	NP_001294985; NP_001294986; NP_001294987; NP_001294988; NP_001294989 NP_001294990; NP_631903	NP_001334553; NP_598535
Location (UCSC)	Chr 5: 111.5 – 111.51 Mb	Chr 18: 33.33 – 33.35 Mb
PubMed search
- Wikidata
View/Edit Human	View/Edit Mouse

StAR-related lipid transfer protein 4 (STARD4) is a soluble protein involved in cholesterol transport. It can transfer up to 7 sterol molecules per minute between artificial membranes.

== Function ==
STARD4 may regulate cholesterol levels in many cells, including in the liver. STARD4 has specifically been linked to the movement of cholesterol to the endoplasmic reticulum. The protein is associated with the endoplasmic reticulum and lipid droplets. Increases in the protein levels are assoaciated with cell stress.

High levels of STARD4 increases the synthesis of bile acids and cholesterol esters in liver hepatocytes. Reductions in cholesterol synthesis by cells increase STARD4 levels while StarD4 declines in mice fed a high cholesterol diet.

Increases in levels of either master gene regulator SREBP-1a or SREBP2, which both promote the production of proteins involved in cholesterol synthesis, increase StarD4 levels in mouse liver. Conversely, increased STARD4 increases active SREBP2 levels.

Loss of the protein in mice has little effect. Mice without functional STARD4 weigh less and females tend to have lower cholesterol profiles. The most dramatic change observed to date is a reduction in NPC-1, a protein involved in bringing cholesterol into cells.

== Structure ==
The protein is 205 amino acids long in the human (224 in the mouse) and almost entirely consists of a StAR-related transfer (START) domain. It also lends its name to the subgroup of START domain proteins it is part of, StarD4. This subfamily includes STARD5 and STARD6 and is closely related to the StarD1/D3 group.
