= DLC1 =

Protein-coding gene in the species Homo sapiens

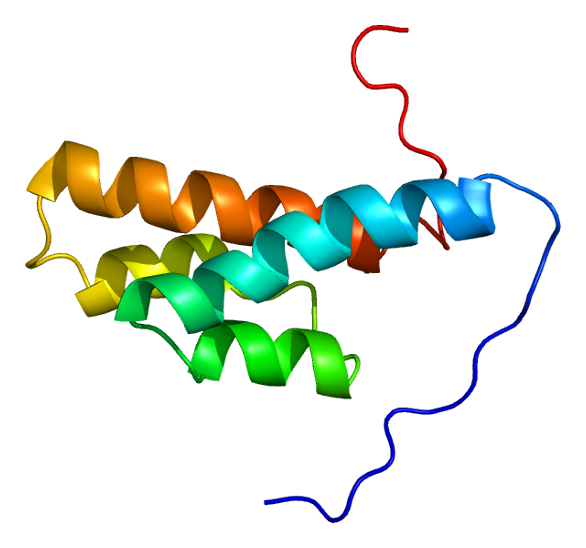

Identifiers
- Aliases: DLC1, ARHGAP7, HP, STARD12, p122-RhoGAP, DLC1 Rho GTPase activating protein
- External IDs: OMIM: 604258; MGI: 1354949; GeneCards: DLC1
Available structures
PDB	Ortholog search: PDBe RCSB
PDB	List of PDB id codes 2DKY, 2GYT, 2KAP, 2LOZ, 3KUQ, 5FZT

Gene location (Human)
Chr.	Chromosome 8 (human)
Band	8p22	Start	13,083,361 bp
Band	8p22	End	13,604,610 bp

Gene location (Mouse)
Chr.	Chromosome 8 (mouse)
Band	8 A4|8 23.05 cM	Start	37,034,905 bp
Band	8 A4|8 23.05 cM	End	37,420,297 bp
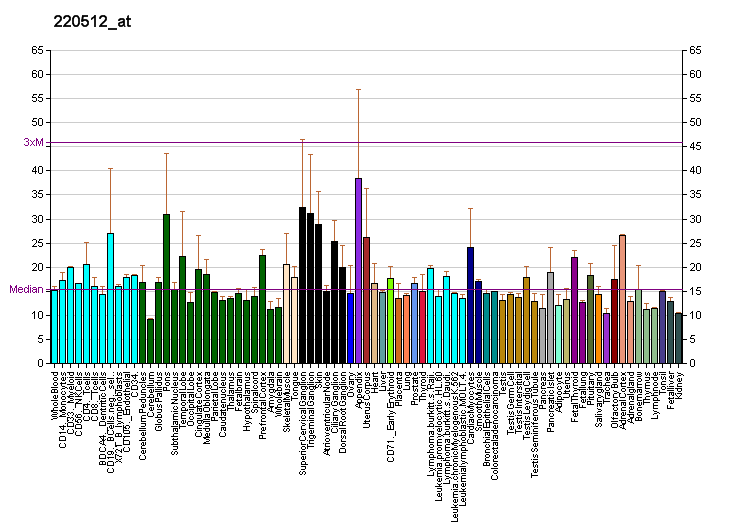

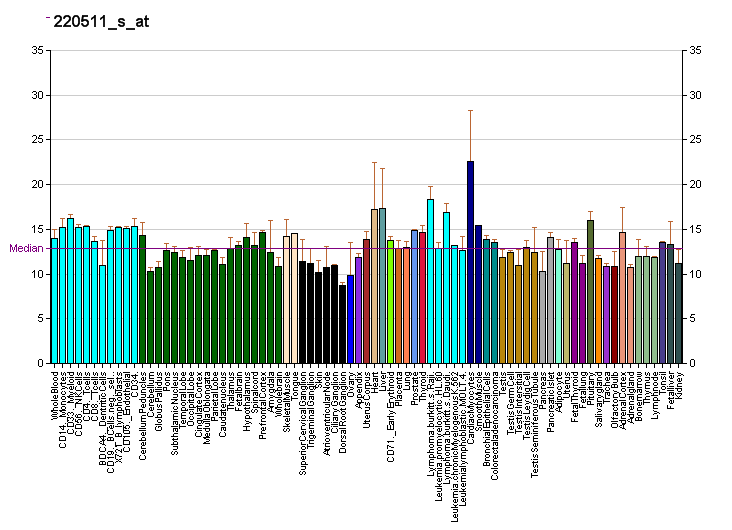

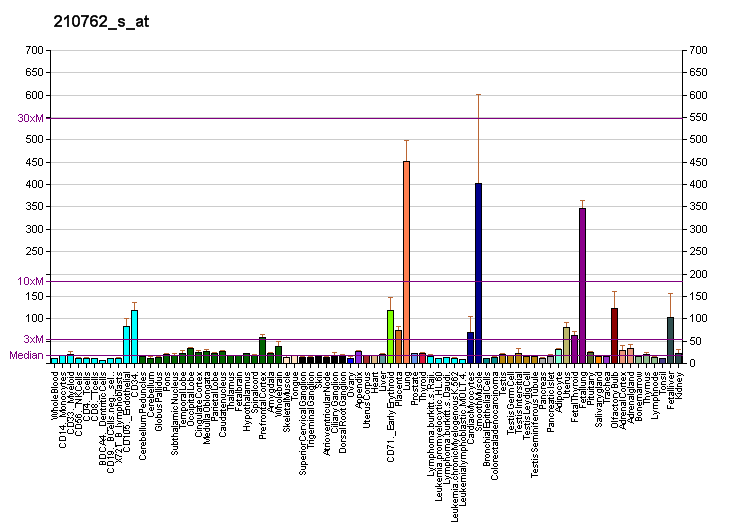
RNA expression pattern
Bgee	Human / Mouse (ortholog); Top expressed in: lower lobe of lung; sural nerve; Achilles tendon; pericardium; upper lobe of lung; upper lobe of left lung; visceral pleura; synovial joint; epithelium of colon; right lung / Top expressed in: left lung lobe; aortic valve; right lung lobe; ascending aorta; brown adipose tissue; interventricular septum; external carotid artery; pineal gland; sciatic nerve; internal carotid artery; More reference expression data
BioGPS	More reference expression data
Gene ontology
Molecular function	SH2 domain binding; protein binding; lipid binding; GTPase activator activity
Cellular component	cytosol; membrane; ruffle membrane; cell junction; cortical actin cytoskeleton; caveola; nucleus; cytoplasm; focal adhesion
Biological process	positive regulation of execution phase of apoptosis; regulation of actin cytoskeleton organization; positive regulation of protein dephosphorylation; negative regulation of Rho protein signal transduction; heart morphogenesis; focal adhesion assembly; neural tube closure; regulation of cell shape; hindbrain morphogenesis; forebrain development; negative regulation of stress fiber assembly; regulation of Rho protein signal transduction; activation of cysteine-type endopeptidase activity involved in apoptotic process; regulation of small GTPase mediated signal transduction; negative regulation of focal adhesion assembly; actin cytoskeleton organization; signal transduction; negative regulation of cell population proliferation; apoptotic process; negative regulation of cell migration; positive regulation of GTPase activity
Sources:Amigo / QuickGO
Orthologs
Databases	NCBI: entry; OMA: entry
Species	Human	Mouse
Entrez	10395	50768
Ensembl	ENSG00000164741; ENSG00000288673	ENSMUSG00000031523
UniProt	Q96QB1	Q9R0Z9
RefSeq (mRNA)	NM_001164271; NM_001316668; NM_006094; NM_024767; NM_182643 NM_001348081; NM_001348082; NM_001348083; NM_001348084	NM_001194940; NM_001194941; NM_015802; NM_178735
RefSeq (protein)	NP_001157743; NP_001303597; NP_006085; NP_079043; NP_872584 NP_001335010; NP_001335011; NP_001335012; NP_001335013	NP_001181869; NP_001181870; NP_056617
Location (UCSC)	Chr 8: 13.08 – 13.6 Mb	Chr 8: 37.03 – 37.42 Mb
PubMed search
- Wikidata
View/Edit Human	View/Edit Mouse

Deleted in Liver Cancer 1 also known as DLC1 and StAR-related lipid transfer protein 12 (STARD12) is a protein which in humans is encoded by the DLC1 gene.

This gene is deleted in the primary tumor of hepatocellular carcinoma. It maps to 8p22-p21.3, a region frequently deleted in solid tumors. This gene is a candidate tumor suppressor gene for human liver cancer, as well as prefacing prostate, lung, colorectal, and breast cancers.

== Gene ==
The human DLC1 gene is located on the short arm of chromosome 8 (8p21.3-22), within a region that frequently undergoes loss of heterozygosity by either genomic deletion or epigenetic silencing mechanisms in several types of solid cancers. The gene contains 14 exons and produces an mRNA transcript that is 6.3 kb in length; the second AUG present in the open reading frame is the major translational start site, and produces a polypeptide which is 1091 amino acids long.

The promoter region of the DLC1 gene contains a CpG island containing several CpG sites which can be methylated to promote gene silencing and prevent transcription.

DLC1 is frequently inactivated in human hepatocellular carcinoma, as well as some nasopharyngeal, lung, breast, prostate, kidney, colon, uterine, ovarian, and gastric cancers.

== Protein structure and localization ==
The DLC1 protein contains four major functional domains: an N-terminal sterile α motif (SAM), a serine-rich (SR) region, a Rho-GAP domain, and a C-terminal steroidogenic acute regulatory protein related lipid-transfer (START) domain. DLC1 is localized to focal adhesions located at the periphery of cells.

=== SAM domain ===
The SAM domain (stretching from amino acids 11-78) is believed to be involved in protein-protein interactions. The exact function of the DLC1 SAM domain has not yet been determined.

=== SR region ===
The relatively unstructured and unconserved SR region (amino acids 86-638) contains a focal adhesion targeting (FAT) domain, including a tyrosine residue at position 442, which interacts with SH2 domains of tensin1 and cten. These interactions allow DLC1 to co-localize along with these proteins to focal adhesions at the periphery of the cell, where it is able to carry out its function as a Rho-GAP protein.

=== Rho-GAP domain ===
The highly conserved Rho-GAP domain (amino acids 639-847) functions to enhance the GTPase activity of the Rho-GTPase proteins RhoA and Cdc42, promoting the hydrolysis of their bound GTP to GDP and thus “shutting off” these proteins. DLC1 contains a conserved “arginine finger” arginine residue at position 677, which is located within the active site of the protein and is essential for catalyzation of the GTP hydrolysis. Rho-GTPases are involved in regulating cell morphology (through cytoskeletal organization) and migration (through focal adhesion formation).

=== START domain ===
The START domain (amino acids 878-1081) contains a β-sheet which forms a hydrophobic tunnel held in place by α-helices. This region interacts with phospholipase C-δ1 (PLCδ1) and activates its ability to hydrolyze the membrane lipid phosphatidylinositol 4,5-bisphosphate (PIP_{2}) into diacylglycerol (DAG) and IP_{3}, which in turn activates protein kinase C (PKC) and increases intracellular calcium ion concentration, which regulates the actin cytoskeleton. In addition, hydrolysis of PIP_{2} releases actin regulatory proteins assembled at PIP_{2} molecules on the membrane and allows them to promote the disassembly of actin filaments. The C-terminus of DLC1 is also known to interact with caveolin-1, although the biological significance of this interaction has not yet been discovered.

== Role in embryogenesis ==
The mouse homologue of DLC1 was required during embryogenesis. While mice heterozygous for the dlc1 gene showed no physical abnormalities, mouse embryos which are homozygous negative for dlc-1 were not able to progress past ten and a half days gestation. Further analysis of the embryos revealed that they had defects in several organs, including the brain, heart, and placenta. In addition, cells of the DLC1-/- embryos had few long actin fibers (indicating that their cytoskeletal organization was impaired) and fewer focal adhesions than those of normal DLC1 expressing cells.

== Significance in cancer ==
As previously mentioned, the dlc1 gene is found to be deleted or down-regulated in several solid cancers, including human liver, non-small cell lung, nasopharyngeal, breast, prostate, kidney, colon, uterine, ovarian, and stomach cancers. It acts as a tumor suppressor gene to inhibit cell growth and proliferation as well as induce apoptosis when a cell is under stress. DLC1 is also involved in the formation of focal adhesions, so loss of DLC1 leads to reduced cell adhesion and increased metastatic potential of cells.

=== Tumor suppressor gene activity ===
DLC1 expression is frequently lost in tumor cells, resulting in constitutive activation of the RhoGTPases RhoA and Cdc42. This results in increased cell growth and proliferation, changes in cell morphology, and inhibition of apoptosis.

A tumor suppressor gene is a gene whose protein product acts to prevent cells from proliferating at inappropriate times, or to induce apoptosis of cells which are damaged beyond repair.

The loss of heterozygosity of DLC1 results when one copy of the gene is deleted or inactivated, but because of the presence of a second functional copy of the gene, no phenotypic changes are observed. However, if this second copy is then deleted or inactivated, the protein is no longer able to be expressed, and changes in cellular phenotype and tumorigenesis may result. These observations are consistent with the tumor suppression properties of DLC1.

The main function of DLC1 is its Rho-GAP activity: its ability to enhance activated GTP-bound Rho-GTPases' (specifically, RhoA and Cdc42) intrinsic ability to convert their GTP into GDP, thus rendering them inactive. RhoGTPases are members of the Ras superfamily, and are involved in actin cytoskeleton organization and cell adhesion. The activity of RhoA regulates the formation of actin stress fibers and focal adhesions - complexes of many proteins located at the termini of actin stress fibers which link the actin cytoskeleton with integrin extracellular matrix receptors. Therefore, when RhoA is inactive, the actin cytoskeletal filaments are unable to form and cell morphology changes, resulting in a default round shape. In addition, focal adhesion formation is inhibited and cells are not well attached to the extracellular matrix and neighbouring cells, thus allowing them to detach and metastasize more readily.

The Rho-GTPase Cdc42 is involved in regulation of the cell cycle and preventing inappropriate cell division. Constitutive activation of Cdc42 due to the absence of RhoGAP proteins such as DLC1 will contribute to the continual repetition of the cell cycle, resulting in uncontrolled cell growth and proliferation.

The addition of DLC1 to tumor cells lines which are deficient in DLC1 expression reduces the RhoA-GTP levels in the cells, which in turn promotes the disassembly of actin stress fibers and cause cells to adopt a rounded morphology. Overexpression of DLC1 also results in inhibited cell growth, proliferation, tumor formation, migration, and increased apoptosis.

=== Involvement in signalling pathways ===
DLC1 is involved in the phosphoinositide and insulin signaling cascades.

As mentioned, the C-terminal START domain of DLC1 is involved in phosphoinositide signaling: it is able to interact with phospholipase C-δ1 (PLC- δ1), thereby stimulating it to hydrolyze PIP_{2} into the second messengers inositol triphosphate (IP_{3}) and diacylglycerol (DAG). IP_{3} causes calcium to be released from vesicles into the cytoplasm, which in turn regulates proteins which are sensitive to high calcium concentrations. DAG activates protein kinase C (PKC) and triggers a cascade of intracellular signals.

DLC1 may have additional role in insulin signaling, as the presence of insulin results in the phosphorylation of the serine residue at position 329 (within the SR region) on DLC1 by protein kinase B (PKB) a.k.a. AKT, although the significance and function of this phosphorylation is as yet unknown.

=== Apoptosis ===
DLC1 is responsible for inducing programmed cell death by at least two mechanisms: caspase-3-mediated apoptosis and Bcl-2 activated mitochondrial-mediated apoptosis.

The process of apoptosis, or programmed cell death, allows cells which are stressed or damaged to die in a controlled and contained manner. Experiments have shown that DLC1 expression initiates a signaling cascade which cleaves the precursor protein procaspase-3 into caspase-3, thereby allowing it to induce caspase-3-mediated apoptosis. Therefore, in the absence of DLC1, apoptosis of cells which are proliferating and passing through the cell cycle uncontrollably is significantly reduced. These cells are unable to destroy themselves, and therefore continue to proliferate and form tumors.

DLC1 also performs a second pro-apoptotic function: it reduces cellular levels of the anti-apoptotic protein Bcl-2. Mitochondrial-mediated apoptosis occurs when the ratio of the pro-apoptotic protein Bax and Bcl-2 is high; therefore, a reduction in Bcl-2 level will lead to an increase in the Bax/Bcl-2 ratio and induce mitochondrial-mediated apoptosis. In tumor cells which are not expressing DLC1, Bcl-2 levels remain high and the ratio of Bax/Bcl-2 low, so apoptosis is inhibited.

The detailed pathways by which DLC1 results in the cleavage of procaspase-3 and decrease in Bcl-2 levels require further investigation.

=== Genomic instability ===
Current research does not suggest that DLC1 plays a role in destabilizing the genome and making it more susceptible to chromosomal rearrangements or gene mutations.

=== Hormonal regulation ===
DLC1 is known to be upregulated by at least two hormones: progesterone and peroxisome proliferators.

In ovarian cancers, DLC-1 expression is upregulated by the steroid hormone progesterone. Gene profiling studies have shown that the addition of progesterone to ovarian cancer cell lines results in an increase in the expression of DLC1, which in turn results in growth inhibition, decreased cell motility, and increased caspase-3-mediated apoptosis.

Lung cancer cells also increase DLC1 expression in response to peroxisome proliferator-activated receptor γ (PPARγ) activators. PPARγ is a steroid hormone receptor which inhibits cellular growth of several epithelial cancers.

=== Role in migration and metastasis ===
In HCC, loss of DLC1 decreases focal adhesion turnover and allows cells to detach from primary tumors. In breast cancers, loss of DLC1 prevents cells from dividing and colonizing a new secondary tumor site.

DLC1 is downregulated in hepatocellular carcinoma cell lines, which, through the inactivation of Rho-GTPases, results in anchorage-independent growth in a semi-solid medium (soft agar), indicating that these cells are not held fast to their neighbors and can detach and are able to metastasize relatively easily. Expression of DLC1 in hepatocellular carcinoma cells resulted in dephosphorylation of tyrosine residues on the molecule focal adhesion kinase (FAK), which results in the disassociation of focal adhesion complexes which are required for cell adhesion; therefore, dephosphorylation of FAK ultimately leads to an increase in focal adhesion turnover and cellular adhesion, and inhibition of cell migration.

Furthermore, in breast cancer cells, DLC1 functions as a metastasis-suppressor gene by inhibiting colonization of a secondary tumor site. Expression of DLC1 inhibited colonization ability by preventing any cells which were able to detach from the primary breast tumor and migrate to a secondary site from initiating division in the microenvironment of a new organ.

=== Angiogenesis ===
As of 2010, current research indicates DLC1 negatively regulates angiogenesis in a paracrine fashion. This is by upregulation of VEGF mediated through the epidermal growth factor receptor (EGFR)-MAP/ERK Kinase (MEK)- hypoxia inducible factor 1 (HIF1) pathway.

=== Epigenetic silencing ===
DLC1 expression is downregulated by both promoter hypermethylation and histone acetylation.

In hepatocellular carcinomas, the dlc1 gene is not always deleted, and can be detected in the tumor cells using PCR, indicating that gene silencing through epigenetic mechanisms must also play an important role in downregulating DLC1 expression. They also demonstrated that the CpG island in the promoter region of the dlc1 gene is hypermethylated due to the action of DNA methyltransferase enzymes in hepatocellular carcinoma tumors, thus preventing the cells’ RNA polymerase and other transcriptional machinery from binding to the promoter an initiating transcription. This result was also verified in gastric cancer cells, prostate cancer cells, and other cancer cell lines with reduced DLC1 expression.

In addition, treatment of DLC1 downregulated tumor cell lines with a histone deacetylase inhibitor prevents histone deacetylase (HDAC) enzymes from removing acetyl groups from specific histones. DNA is wrapped tightly around acetylated histones, thus preventing the transcriptional machinery from accessing the dlc1 gene, which is hidden within tightly packaged chromatin, and transcribing it into mRNA.

One hypothesis states that the activity of HDAC in the CpG region of the dlc1 gene promotes its silencing through interaction between the DNA and acetylated histone proteins. Following this, histone methyltransferases add methyl groups to the tail of histones (specifically, histone H3), which allows DNA methyltransferases to methylate the CpG’s of the dlc1 promoter itself, promoting the tight chromatin packaging which prevents transcription.

== Drug discovery and future therapies ==
The genomic deletion or downregulation of DLC1 expression in early tumors could serve as an indicator for future cancer progression and spread.

Research into therapies for cancers with reduced levels of DLC1 expression due to epigenetic silencing could provide insight into the efficiency of epigenetic regulating molecules. For example, Zebularine, a demethylating agent, could be used to remove the methyl groups from the CpGs of the dlc1 promoter, thus increasing expression of DLC1 and helping to block tumor cell proliferation and metastasis. In addition, histone deacetylase inhibitors could potentially be used to prevent deacetylation of histones and loosen up the chromatin structure, thereby allowing RNA polymerase and other transcriptional proteins to reach the DNA and allow transcription to occur.

Natural dietary flavones, found in parsley, celery, and citrus peels, reactivate DLC1 expression in breast cancer cell lines which have decreased DLC1 expression due to promoter hypermethylation, and may potentially be used as an anti-cancer agent for prevention and therapy of breast and other DLC1 downregulated cancers.
