= STARD10 =

Protein-coding gene in the species Homo sapiens

Identifiers
- Aliases: STARD10, NY-CO-28, PCTP2, SDCCAG28, CGI-52, StAR related lipid transfer domain containing 10
- External IDs: OMIM: 617382; MGI: 1860093; GeneCards: STARD10

Gene location (Human)
Chr.	Chromosome 11 (human)
Band	11q13.4	Start	72,754,729 bp
Band	11q13.4	End	72,794,047 bp

Gene location (Mouse)
Chr.	Chromosome 7 (mouse)
Band	7|7 E2	Start	100,966,293 bp
Band	7|7 E2	End	100,995,833 bp
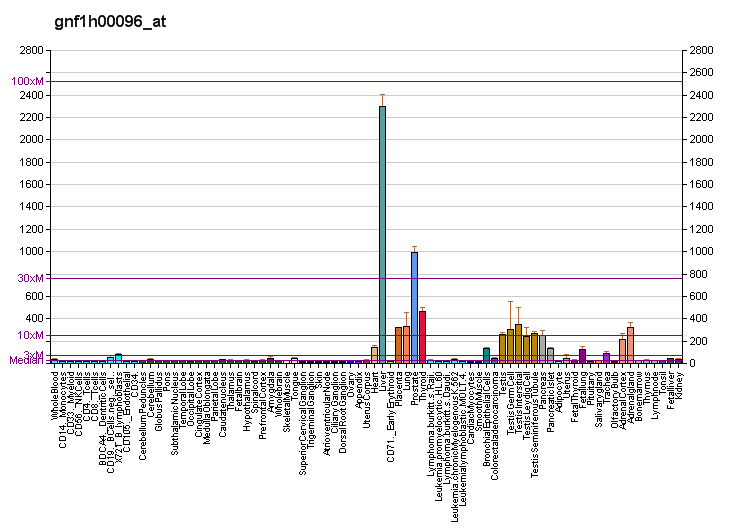
RNA expression pattern
Bgee	Human / Mouse (ortholog); Top expressed in: right lobe of liver; mucosa of transverse colon; body of pancreas; left adrenal cortex; right testis; left testis; right adrenal cortex; rectum; olfactory zone of nasal mucosa; mucosa of ileum / Top expressed in: left lobe of liver; epithelium of stomach; pyloric antrum; crypt of lieberkuhn of small intestine; seminiferous tubule; gallbladder; mucous cell of stomach; right kidney; spermatid; human kidney; More reference expression data
BioGPS	More reference expression data
Gene ontology
Molecular function	protein binding; lipid binding; phospholipid transporter activity
Cellular component	cytoplasm; cell projection; cytosol; microvillus; membrane; intercellular canaliculus; motile cilium; cilium
Biological process	bile acid secretion; positive regulation of peroxisome proliferator activated receptor signaling pathway; lipid transport; phosphatidylcholine biosynthetic process; phospholipid transport
Sources:Amigo / QuickGO
Orthologs
Databases	NCBI: entry; OMA: entry
Species	Human	Mouse
Entrez	10809	56018
Ensembl	ENSG00000214530	ENSMUSG00000030688
UniProt	Q9Y365	Q9JMD3
RefSeq (mRNA)	NM_006645	NM_019990; NM_001360460
RefSeq (protein)	NP_006636	NP_064374; NP_001347389
Location (UCSC)	Chr 11: 72.75 – 72.79 Mb	Chr 7: 100.97 – 101 Mb
PubMed search
- Wikidata
View/Edit Human	View/Edit Mouse

StAR-related lipid transfer protein 10 (STARD10) or PCTP-like protein is a lipid transfer protein that in humans is encoded by the STARD10 gene. The protein derives its name from the fact that the molecule contains a START domain. As part of the StarD2 subfamily, StarD10 can transport the lipids phosphatidylcholine and phosphatidylethanolamine between membranes in solution. Casein kinase II phosphorylates the protein on its serine at position 184.

The function of StarD10 in the cell is not yet understood. Its expression is associated with cancer, but the nature of its role is unclear. Most recent data indicate that loss of StarD10 expression in breast cancer is associated with poor outcomes in patients.
