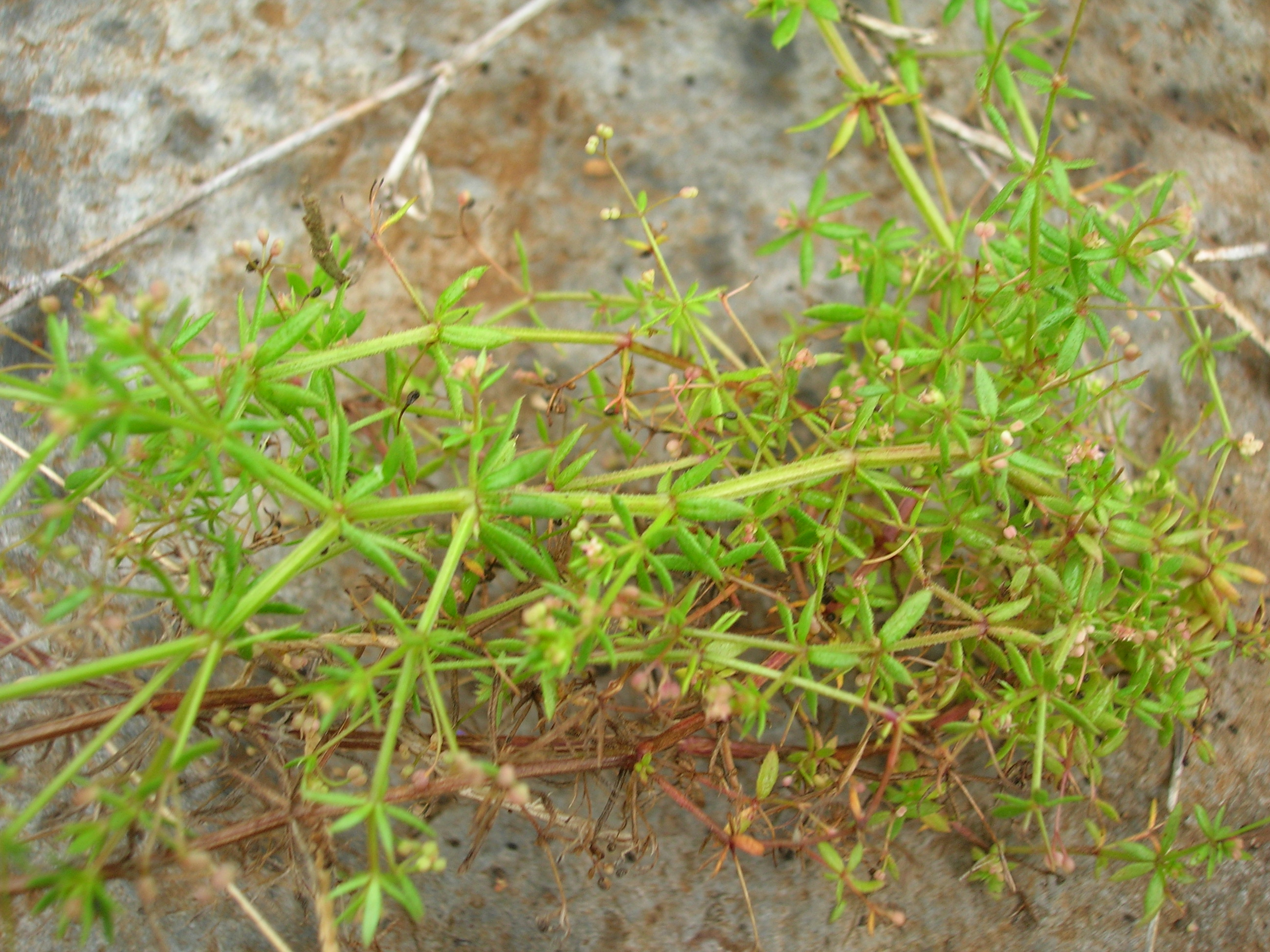

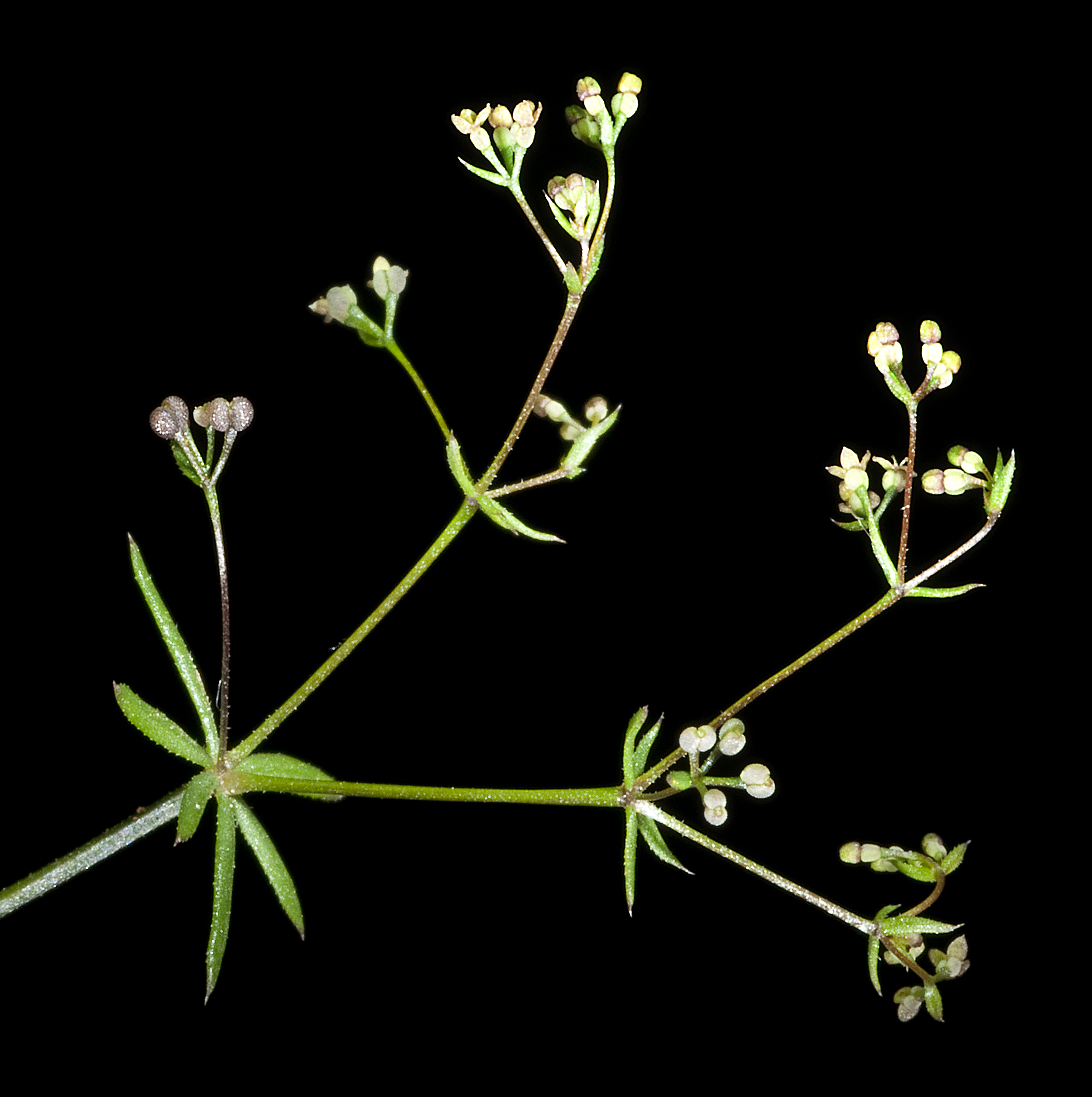

Scientific classification
- Kingdom: Plantae
- Clade: Tracheophytes
- Clade: Angiosperms
- Clade: Eudicots
- Clade: Asterids
- Order: Gentianales
- Family: Rubiaceae
- Genus: Galium
- Species: G. divaricatum

Binomial name
- Galium divaricatum Pourr. ex Lam.

Synonyms
- Galium anglicum Galium parvifolium

= Galium divaricatum =

Lamarck's bedstraw

Species of plant

Galium divaricatum is a species of flowering plant in the coffee family known by the common name Lamarck's bedstraw.

== Distribution ==
The plant is native to the Mediterranean Basin and the Black Sea region, from Portugal and Morocco to Turkey and Crimea; as well as the Macaronesia archipelago.

It has naturalized in Belgium, Switzerland, Australia, New Zealand, Hawaii and scattered locations in the mainland United States.

== Description ==
Galium divaricatum is a small annual herb with thin spreading stems up to 30 centimeters long. The small, pointed leaves are arranged in whorls of up to eight about the stem.

It bears white flowers. The fruit is a hairless nutlet.
