= (S)-norcoclaurine synthase =

Class of enzymes

Identifiers
- EC no.: 3.5.99.14
- CAS no.: 79122-01-3

Databases
- IntEnz: IntEnz view
- BRENDA: BRENDA entry
- ExPASy: NiceZyme view
- KEGG: KEGG entry
- MetaCyc: metabolic pathway
- PRIAM: profile
- PDB structures: RCSB PDB PDBe PDBsum
- Gene Ontology: AmiGO / QuickGO
Search
- PMC: articles
- PubMed: articles
- NCBI: proteins

The enzyme (S)-norcoclaurine synthase (EC 3.5.99.14) catalyzes the chemical reaction:

4-hydroxyphenylacetaldehyde + 4-(2-aminoethyl)benzene-1,2-diol (Dopamine) $\rightleftharpoons$ (S)-norcoclaurine + H_{2}O

Biosynthesis of (S)-norcoclaurine from dopamine and 4-hydroxyphenylacetaldehyde

This enzyme belongs to the family of lyases, specifically the hydro-lyases, which cleave carbon-oxygen bonds. The systematic name of this enzyme class is 4-hydroxyphenylacetaldehyde hydro-lyase [adding dopamine (S)-norcoclaurine-forming]. Other names in common use include (S)-norlaudanosoline synthase, and 4-hydroxyphenylacetaldehyde hydro-lyase (adding dopamine). This enzyme participates in isoquinoline alkaloid biosynthesis.
