= Phosphatidylcholine transfer protein =

Intracellular phospholipid binding protein

PCTP
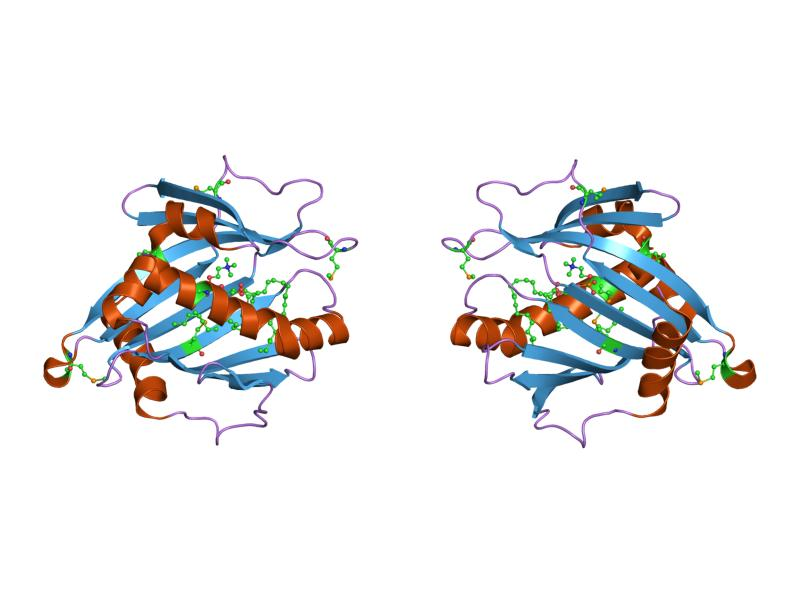

Identifiers
- Aliases: PCTP, Pctp, PC-TP, StarD2, phosphatidylcholine transfer protein
- External IDs: OMIM: 606055; MGI: 107375; GeneCards: PCTP
Available structures
PDB	Ortholog search: PDBe RCSB
PDB	List of PDB id codes 1LN1, 1LN2, 1LN3

Gene location (Human)
Chr.	Chromosome 17 (human)
Band	17q22	Start	55,751,051 bp
Band	17q22	End	55,842,830 bp

Gene location (Mouse)
Chr.	Chromosome 11 (mouse)
Band	11 C|11 54.7 cM	Start	89,873,491 bp
Band	11 C|11 54.7 cM	End	89,893,720 bp
RNA expression pattern
Bgee	Human / Mouse (ortholog); Top expressed in: secondary oocyte; right lobe of liver; right lung; monocyte; mucosa of transverse colon; placenta; sural nerve; rectum; blood; kidney tubule / Top expressed in: left lobe of liver; yolk sac; lumbar spinal ganglion; skin of external ear; right kidney; stroma of bone marrow; lip; proximal tubule; human kidney; granulocyte; More reference expression data
BioGPS	n/a
Gene ontology
Molecular function	protein binding; phosphatidylcholine transporter activity; phosphatidylcholine binding; lipid binding; phospholipid transporter activity
Cellular component	cytoplasm; cytosol
Biological process	phospholipid transport; lipid transport; phosphatidylcholine biosynthetic process; negative regulation of cold-induced thermogenesis
Sources:Amigo / QuickGO
Orthologs
Databases	NCBI: entry; OMA: entry
Species	Human	Mouse
Entrez	58488	18559
Ensembl	ENSG00000141179	ENSMUSG00000020553
UniProt	Q9UKL6	P53808; Q5SV41
RefSeq (mRNA)	NM_001102402; NM_021213; NM_001330377; NM_001330378	NM_008796; NM_001316372
RefSeq (protein)	NP_001095872; NP_001317306; NP_001317307; NP_067036	NP_001303301; NP_032822
Location (UCSC)	Chr 17: 55.75 – 55.84 Mb	Chr 11: 89.87 – 89.89 Mb
PubMed search
- Wikidata
View/Edit Human	View/Edit Mouse

Phosphatidylcholine transfer protein (PCTP), also known as StAR-related lipid transfer domain protein 2 (STARD2), is a specific intracellular phospholipid binding protein that can transfer phosphatidylcholine between different membranes in the cytosol.

In humans, phosphatidylcholine transfer protein is encoded by the PCTP gene.

== Function ==
PCTP transfers phosphatidylcholine molecules between membranes in vitro. Further studies found that sensitivity to phosphatidylcholine levels causes PCTP to interact with select enzymes, promoting their activation. PCTP stimulates the acyl-CoA thioesterase activity of thioesterase superfamily member 2 (Them2)/acyl-CoA thioesterase 13 (ACOT13) and the activity of homeodomain transcription factor paired box gene 3 (PAX3). Protein kinase C phosphorylation promotes localization of PCTP to the mitochondrion where it may activate Them2.

== Structure ==
This soluble protein is 214 amino acids long. It is almost entirely composed of a StAR-related transfer domain (START). X-ray crystallography shows that this domain forms a pocket that can bind a single molecule of phosphatidylcholine.

This protein also founds the StarD2 subfamily of proteins. This subfamily consists of PCTP, StarD7, StarD10 and collagen type IV alpha-3-binding protein or StarD11, all of which bind phosphatidylcholine except for StarD11 which prefers ceramide.

== Tissue distribution and pathology ==
PCTP is produced in all tissues in the body at various levels. The protein is expressed at high levels in tissues engaged in high metabolism, notably including the liver and macrophages.

No human patients with defects in PCTP have been described to date. Mice lacking PCTP exhibit a resistance to atherosclerosis linked to changes in plasma lipid levels and changes in body weight linked to the level of brown fat use of fatty acids and Them2 activity. Loss of PCTP in fasting mice alters the sensitivity of the liver to insulin, reducing glucose and free fatty acid levels.
