= StAR-related transfer domain =

Lipid-binding protein domain

START
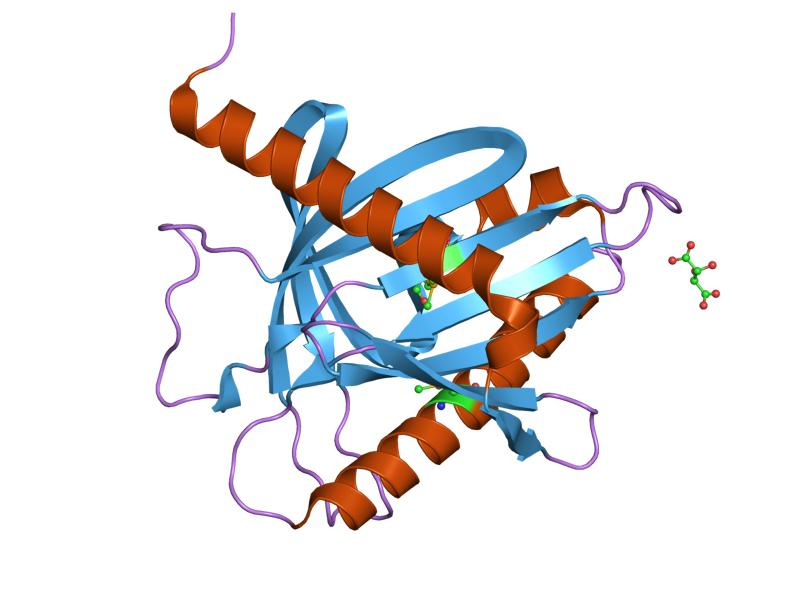
- star-related lipid transport domain of mln64

Identifiers
- Symbol: START
- Pfam: PF01852
- Pfam clan: CL0209
- InterPro: IPR002913
- SMART: START
- SCOP2: 1em2 / SCOPe / SUPFAM
- OPM superfamily: 138
- OPM protein: 1ln1
- Membranome: 564
Available protein structures:
- PDB: IPR002913 PF01852 (ECOD; PDBsum)
- AlphaFold: IPR002913; PF01852

START domain

Identifiers
- Symbol: START
- Pfam: PF01852
- InterPro: IPR002913
- SMART: START
- SCOP2: 1em2 / SCOPe / SUPFAM
- TCDB: 9.B.64
- CDD: cd00177
Available protein structures:
- PDB: IPR002913 PF01852 (ECOD; PDBsum)
- AlphaFold: IPR002913; PF01852

START (StAR-related lipid-transfer) is a lipid-binding domain in StAR, HD-ZIP and signalling proteins. The archetypical domain is found in StAR (Steroidogenic acute regulatory protein), a mitochondrial protein that is synthesized in steroid-producing cells. StAR initiates steroid production by mediating the delivery of cholesterol to the first enzyme in the steroidogenic pathway. The START domain is critical for this activity, perhaps through the binding of cholesterol. Following the discovery of StAR, 15 START-domain-containing proteins (termed STARD1 through STARD15) were subsequently identified in vertebrates as well as other that are related.

Thousands of proteins containing at least one START domain have been determined in invertebrates, bacteria and plants to form a larger superfamily, variously known as START, Bet v1-like or SRPBCC (START/RHOalphaC/PITP/Bet v1/CoxG/CalC) domain proteins, all of which bind hydrophobic ligands. In the case of plants, many of the START proteins fall into the category of putative lipid/sterol-binding homeodomain (HD) transcription factors or HD-START proteins.

Representatives of the START domain family bind different substances or ligands such as sterols (e.g., StAR or STARD1) and lipids like phosphatidylcholine (phosphatidylcholine transfer protein, also called PCTP or STARD2) and have enzymatic activities. Ligand binding by the START domain in multidomain proteins can also regulate the activities of the other domains, such as the RhoGAP domain, the homeodomain and the thioesterase domain.

== Structure ==
The crystal structure of START domain of human MLN64 shows an alpha/beta fold built around a U-shaped incomplete beta-barrel. Most importantly, the interior of the protein encompasses a 26 × 12 × 11-Angstrom hydrophobic tunnel that is apparently large enough to bind a single cholesterol molecule. The START domain structure revealed an unexpected similarity to that of the birch pollen allergen Bet v 1 and to bacterial polyketide cyclases/aromatases.

== Human proteins containing the START domain ==
START domain-containing proteins in the human are divided into five subfamilies. An exception is StarD9 whose activity remains unknown. Other proteins also exist in the human with domains that are members of the START-based superfamily such as PITP, but are not part of the START domain itself.

Mutations in STAR D9 (KIF16A) have been associated with a syndrome that includes severe ID, characteristic features, epilepsy, acquired microcephaly, and blindness. The STAR D9 gene encodes a 4.7 kilodalton amino acid protein which is a member of the kinesin superfamily. C-terminally truncated STAR D9 mutants are known from experimental work to induce spindle assembly defects. In the reported case, several mitotic defects including multipolar spindle formation, fragmentation of pericentriolar materials, and centrosome amplification were found.

=== Cholesterol/oxysterol binding StarD1/D3 subfamily ===
These proteins are primarily concerned with cholesterol transport

StAR (STARD1)
MLN64 (STARD3)

=== StarD4 subfamily ===
These proteins are involved in cholesterol and oxysterol transport

STARD4
STARD5
STARD6

=== Phospholipid/sphingolipid binding StarD2 subfamily ===
Phosphatidylcholine transfer protein (PCTP/STARD2)
STARD7
STARD10
Collagen type IV alpha-3-binding protein (COL4A3BP/Ceramide transfer protein (CERT)/STARD11)

=== SAM-RhoGAP-START subfamily ===
These proteins contain both the START domain and Rho-GTPase signaling activity

STARD8 (DLC-3)
DLC1 (STARD12)
STARD13 (DLC-2)

=== Acyl-CoA thioesterase subfamily ===
The members of this subfamily possess the START domain and thioesterase activity

ACOT11 (STARD14)
ACOT12 (STARD15)

== See also ==
- Sterol carrier protein
