= Steroidogenic acute regulatory protein, mitochondrial =

Protein-coding gene in the species Homo sapiens

STAR

Identifiers
- Aliases: STAR, STARD1, steroidogenic acute regulatory protein
- External IDs: OMIM: 600617; MGI: 102760; GeneCards: STAR
Available structures
PDB	Ortholog search: PDBe RCSB
PDB	List of PDB id codes 3P0L

Gene location (Human)
Chr.	Chromosome 8 (human)
Band	8p11.23	Start	38,142,700 bp
Band	8p11.23	End	38,150,992 bp

Gene location (Mouse)
Chr.	Chromosome 8 (mouse)
Band	8 A2|8 14.17 cM	Start	26,296,583 bp
Band	8 A2|8 14.17 cM	End	26,306,010 bp
RNA expression pattern
Bgee	Human / Mouse (ortholog); Top expressed in: right adrenal gland; right adrenal cortex; left adrenal gland; left adrenal cortex; left ovary; right ovary; right testis; left testis; testicle; left uterine tube / Top expressed in: adrenal gland; Gonadal ridge; placenta; spermatocyte; testicle; decidua; adrenal medulla; aortic valve; spleen; ascending aorta; More reference expression data
BioGPS	n/a
Gene ontology
Molecular function	protein binding; cholesterol transfer activity; lipid binding; cholesterol binding
Cellular component	cytosol; mitochondrial intermembrane space; soma; mitochondrial crista; neuron projection; mitochondrion
Biological process	negative regulation of neuron apoptotic process; cellular response to transforming growth factor beta stimulus; estrogen biosynthetic process; response to ionizing radiation; response to fungicide; cellular response to gonadotropin stimulus; phenol-containing compound metabolic process; male gonad development; phthalate metabolic process; biphenyl metabolic process; cellular response to luteinizing hormone stimulus; cellular response to growth hormone stimulus; lipid transport; cellular lipid metabolic process; response to organic cyclic compound; cellular response to follicle-stimulating hormone stimulus; circadian sleep/wake cycle, REM sleep; response to nutrient; insecticide metabolic process; glucocorticoid metabolic process; diterpenoid metabolic process; response to corticosterone; response to antibiotic; response to steroid hormone; cellular response to organic cyclic compound; response to nicotine; regulation of steroid biosynthetic process; response to peptide hormone; cholesterol metabolic process; cellular response to alkaloid; cellular response to cadmium ion; cellular response to fibroblast growth factor stimulus; response to activity; response to organic substance; response to gonadotropin; cellular response to dexamethasone stimulus; response to estrogen; cellular response to epinephrine stimulus; C21-steroid hormone biosynthetic process; positive regulation of neurogenesis; brain development; positive regulation of gene expression; cellular response to metal ion; intracellular cholesterol transport; response to nutrient levels; response to lead ion; dibenzo-p-dioxin metabolic process; circadian rhythm; cellular response to interferon-alpha; cellular response to insulin stimulus; cellular response to interferon-gamma; cellular response to antibiotic; regulation of neuronal synaptic plasticity; response to insecticide; response to ethanol; response to leptin; bile acid biosynthetic process; cellular response to lipopolysaccharide; response to toxic substance; response to herbicide; response to hydrogen peroxide; testosterone biosynthetic process; cellular response to cAMP; cellular response to glucose stimulus; steroid biosynthetic process; organic acid metabolic process; positive regulation of bile acid biosynthetic process
Sources:Amigo / QuickGO
Orthologs
Databases	NCBI: entry; OMA: entry
Species	Human	Mouse
Entrez	6770	20845
Ensembl	ENSG00000147465	ENSMUSG00000031574
UniProt	P49675	P51557
RefSeq (mRNA)	NM_000349; NM_001007243	NM_011485
RefSeq (protein)	NP_000340	NP_035615
Location (UCSC)	Chr 8: 38.14 – 38.15 Mb	Chr 8: 26.3 – 26.31 Mb
PubMed search
- Wikidata
View/Edit Human	View/Edit Mouse

Steroidogenic acute regulatory protein (StAR, also known as STARD1) is a transport protein that in humans is encoded by the STAR gene. It regulates the transfer of cholesterol from the outer to the inner mitochondrial membrane, a rate-limiting step in the synthesis of steroid hormones from cholesterol. This transfer enables the conversion of cholesterol into pregnenolone. StAR is primarily expressed in steroid-producing cells, including theca cells and luteal cells of the ovary, Leydig cells of the testis, and cells of the adrenal cortex. Mutations in the STAR gene cause congenital lipoid adrenal hyperplasia (CLAH), also known as lipoid CAH. A pseudogene is located on chromosome 13.

== Gene ==
In humans, the gene for StAR is located on chromosome 8p11.23.

The closest homolog to StAR is MLN64 (STARD3). Together they comprise the StarD1/D3 subfamily of START domain-containing proteins.

== Production ==
StAR is a mitochondrial protein that is rapidly synthesized in response to stimulation of the cell to produce steroid. Hormones that stimulate its production depend on the cell type and include luteinizing hormone (LH), ACTH and angiotensin II.

At the cellular level, StAR is synthesized typically in response to activation of the cAMP second messenger system, although other systems can be involved even independently of cAMP.

StAR has thus far been found in all tissues that can produce steroids, including the adrenal cortex, the gonads, the brain and the nonhuman placenta. One known exception is the human placenta.

Substances that suppress StAR activity, like those listed below, can cause endocrine disrupting effects, including altered steroid hormone levels and fertility.

1. Alcohol
2. DEHP and DBP
3. Permethrin and cypermethrin
4. DES and arsenite
5. BPA

== Structure ==
The protein has 285 amino acids. The signal sequence of StAR that targets it to the mitochondria is clipped off in two steps with import into the mitochondria. Phosphorylation at the serine at position 195 increases its activity.

The domain of StAR important for promoting cholesterol transfer is the StAR-related transfer domain (START domain). StAR is the prototypic member of the START domain family of proteins and is thus also known as STARD1 for "START domain-containing protein 1". It is hypothesized that the START domain forms a pocket in StAR that binds single cholesterol molecules for delivery to P450scc.

== Function ==
Cholesterol needs to be transferred from the outer mitochondrial membrane to the inner membrane where cytochrome P450scc enzyme (CYP11A1) cleaves the cholesterol side chain, which is the first enzymatic step in all steroid synthesis. The aqueous phase between these two membranes cannot be crossed by the lipophilic cholesterol, unless certain proteins assist in this process. A number of proteins have historically been proposed to facilitate this transfer including: sterol carrier protein 2 (SCP2), steroidogenic activator polypeptide (SAP), peripheral benzodiazepine receptor (PBR or translocator protein, TSPO), and StAR. It is now clear that this process is primarily mediated by the action of StAR.

The mechanism by which StAR causes cholesterol movement remains unclear as it appears to act from the outside of the mitochondria and its entry into the mitochondria ends its function. Various hypotheses have been advanced. Some involve StAR transferring cholesterol itself like a shuttle. While StAR may bind cholesterol itself, the exorbitant number of cholesterol molecules that the protein transfers would indicate that it would have to act as a cholesterol channel instead of a shuttle. Another notion is that it causes cholesterol to be kicked out of the outer membrane to the inner (cholesterol desorption). StAR may also promote the formation of contact sites between the outer and inner mitochondrial membranes to allow cholesterol influx. Another suggests that StAR acts in conjunction with PBR, causing the movement of Cl^{−} out of the mitochondria to facilitate contact site formation. However, evidence for an interaction between StAR and PBR remains elusive.

== New roles ==
Recent findings suggest that StAR may also traffic cholesterol to a second mitochondrial enzyme, sterol 27-hydroxylase. This enzyme converts cholesterol to 27-hydroxycholesterol. In this way it may be important for the first step in one of the two pathways for the production of bile acids by the liver (the alternative pathway).

Evidence also shows that the presence of StAR in a type of immune cell, the macrophage, where it can stimulate the production of 27-hydroxycholesterol. In this case, 27-hydroxycholesterol may by itself be helpful against the production of inflammatory factors associated with cardiovascular disease. No study has yet found a link between the loss of StAR and problems in bile acid production or increased risk for cardiovascular disease.

Recently StAR was found to be expressed in cardiac fibroblasts in response to ischemic injury due to myocardial infarction. In these cells it has no apparent de novo steroidogenic activity, as evidenced by the lack of the key steroidogenic enzymes cytochrome P450 side chain cleavage (CYP11A1) and 3 beta hydroxysteroid dehydrogenase (3βHSD). StAR was found to have an anti-apoptotic effect on the fibroblasts, which may allow them to survive the initial stress of the infarct, differentiate and function in tissue repair at the infarction site.

== Pathology ==
Mutations in the gene for StAR cause lipoid congenital adrenal hyperplasia (lipoid CAH), in which patients produce little steroid and can die shortly after birth. Mutations that less severely affect the function of StAR result in nonclassic lipoid CAH or familial glucocorticoid deficiency type 3. All known mutations disrupt StAR function by altering its START domain. In the case of StAR mutation, the phenotype does not present until birth since human placental steroidogenesis is independent of StAR.

At the cellular level, the lack of StAR results in a pathologic accumulation of lipid within cells, especially noticeable in the adrenal cortex as seen in the mouse model. The testes are undescended and the resident steroidogenic Leydig cells are modestly affected. Early in life, the ovary is spared as it does not express StAR until puberty. After puberty, lipid accumulations and hallmarks of ovarian failure are noted.

While loss of functional StAR in the human and the mouse catastrophically reduces steroid production, it does not eliminate all of it, indicating the existence of StAR-independent pathways for steroid generation. Aside from the human placenta, these pathways are considered minor for endocrine production.

It is unclear what factors catalyze StAR-independent steroidogenesis. Candidates include oxysterols which can be freely converted to steroid and the ubiquitous MLN64.

== History ==
The StAR protein was first identified, characterized and named by Douglas Stocco at Texas Tech University Health Sciences Center in 1994. The role of this protein in lipoid CAH was confirmed the following year in collaboration with Walter Miller at the University of California, San Francisco. All of this work follows the initial observations of the appearance of this protein and its phosphorylated form coincident with factors that caused steroid production by Nanette Orme-Johnson while at Tufts University.

== See also ==
- Steroidogenic enzyme
