= ADP ribosylation factor =

Group of proteins

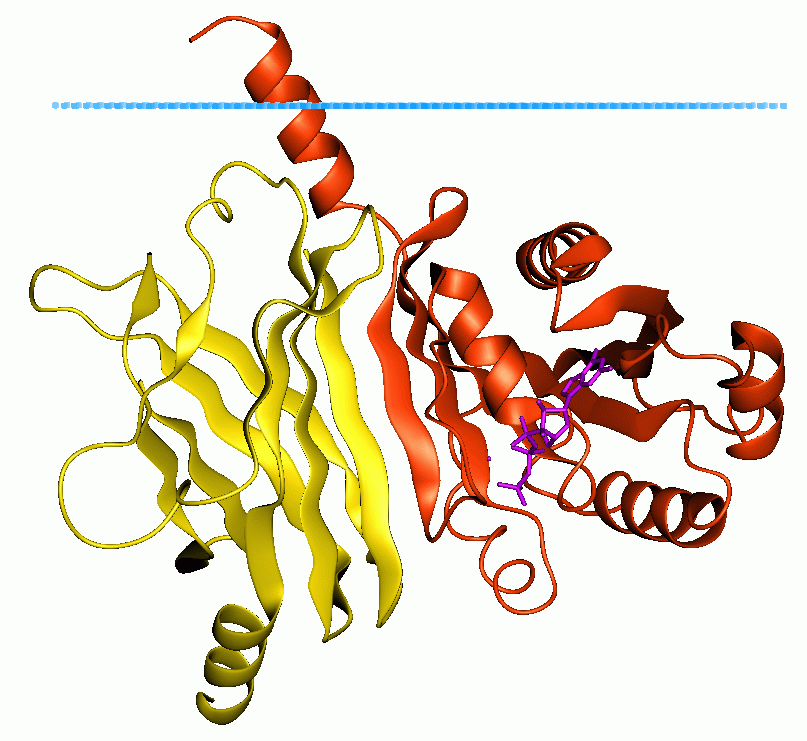
- Membrane-bound ADP ribosylation factor-like protein 2 (ARL2 mouse, red), complex with phosphodiesterase delta (yellow) (1ksg) Blue dots show hydrocarbon boundary of the lipid bilayer

Identifiers
- Symbol: Arf
- Pfam: PF00025
- InterPro: IPR006689
- SMART: ARF
- PROSITE: PDOC01020
- SCOP2: 1hur / SCOPe / SUPFAM
- OPM superfamily: 124
- OPM protein: 1ksg
- CDD: cd00878
- Membranome: 1103
Available protein structures:
- PDB: IPR006689 PF00025 (ECOD; PDBsum)
- AlphaFold: IPR006689; PF00025

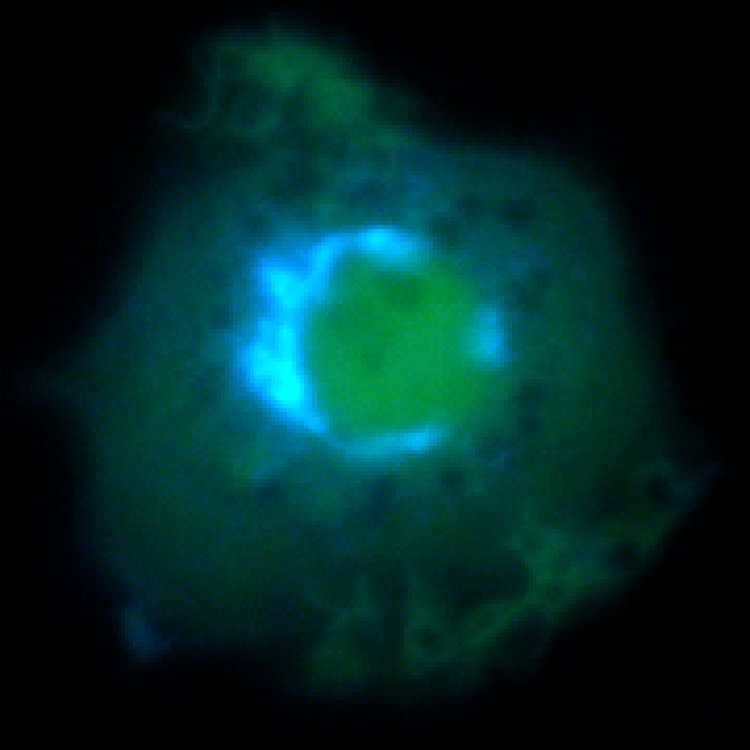
Distribution of ARF in a living macrophage, highlighting the Golgi apparatus.

ADP ribosylation factors (ARFs) are members of the ARF family of GTP-binding proteins of the Ras superfamily. ARF family proteins are ubiquitous in eukaryotic cells, and six highly conserved members of the family have been identified in mammalian cells. Although ARFs are soluble, they generally associate with membranes because of N-terminus myristoylation. They function as regulators of vesicular traffic and actin remodelling.

The small ADP ribosylation factor (Arf) GTP-binding proteins are major regulators of vesicle biogenesis in intracellular traffic. They are the founding members of a growing family that includes Arl (Arf-like), Arp (Arf-related proteins) and the remotely related Sar (Secretion-associated and Ras-related) proteins. Arf proteins cycle between inactive GDP-bound and active GTP-bound forms that bind selectively to effectors. The classical structural GDP/GTP switch is characterised by conformational changes at the so-called switch 1 and switch 2 regions, which bind tightly to the gamma-phosphate of GTP but poorly or not at all to the GDP nucleotide. Structural studies of Arf1 and Arf6 have revealed that although these proteins feature the switch 1 and 2 conformational changes, they depart from other small GTP-binding proteins in that they use an additional, unique switch to propagate structural information from one side of the protein to the other.

The GDP/GTP structural cycles of human Arf1 and Arf6 feature a unique conformational change that affects the beta2beta3 strands connecting switch 1 and switch 2 (interswitch) and also the amphipathic helical N-terminus. In GDP-bound Arf1 and Arf6, the interswitch is retracted and forms a pocket to which the N-terminal helix binds, the latter serving as a molecular hasp to maintain the inactive conformation. In the GTP-bound form of these proteins, the interswitch undergoes a two-residue register shift that pulls switch 1 and switch 2 up, restoring an active conformation that can bind GTP. In this conformation, the interswitch projects out of the protein and extrudes the N-terminal hasp by occluding its binding pocket.

== Regulatory proteins ==
ARFs regularly associate with two types of protein, those involved in catalyzing GTP/GDP exchange, and those that serve other functions. ARFs act as a regulatory subunit that control coat assembly in coat protein I (COPI), and clathrin-coated vesicles.

=== GTP/GDP exchange proteins ===
ARF binds to two forms of the guanosine nucleotide, guanosine triphosphate (GTP) and guanosine diphosphate (GDP). The shape of the ARF molecule is dependent upon the form to which it is bound, allowing it to serve in a regulatory capacity. ARF requires assistance from other proteins in order to switch between binding to GTP and GDP. GTPase activating proteins (GAPs) force ARF to hydrolyze bound GTP to GDP, and Guanine nucleotide exchange factors force ARF to adopt a new GTP molecule in place of a bound GDP.

=== Other proteins ===
Other proteins interact with ARF, depending upon whether or not it is bound to GTP or GDP. The active form, ARF*GTP, binds to vesicle coat proteins and adaptors, including coat protein I (COPI) and various phospholipids. The inactive form is only known to bind to a class of transmembrane proteins. Different types of ARF bind specifically different kinds of effector proteins.

== Phylogeny ==
There are currently 6 known mammalian ARF proteins, which are divided into three classes of ARFs:

- class 1: ARF1, ARF2, ARF3
- class 2: ARF4, ARF5
- class 3: ARF6. (See also ARF6)

== Structure ==
ARFs are small proteins of approximately 20 kDa in size. They contain two switch regions, which change relative positions between cycles of GDP/GTP-binding. ARFs are frequently myristoylated in their N-terminal region, which contributes to their membrane association.

== Examples ==
Human genes encoding proteins containing this domain include:

- ARF1 ARF3 ARF4 ARF5 ARF6 ARFRP1
- ARL1 ARL2 ARL2L1 ARL3 ARL4A ARL4C ARL4D ARL5 ARL5A ARL5B
- ARL10 ARL11 ARL13A ARL13B ARL14 ARL15 ARL16 ARL17
- ARL6 ARL7 ARL8A ARL8B ARL9
- MGC57346
- SAR1A SAR1B SAR1P3 SARA1 TRIM23

== See also ==
- Brefeldin A
