= ARL =

ARL may refer to:

== Military ==
- A US Navy hull classification symbol: Landing craft repair ship (ARL)
- Admiralty Research Laboratory, UK
- United States Army Research Laboratory
- ARL 44, a WWII French tank

== Organizations ==
- Aero Research Limited, a UK adhesives company
- Air Resources Laboratory of US NOAA
- Association of Research Libraries, US and Canada
- Pennsylvania State University Applied Research Laboratory, US
- Animal Rescue League of Western Pennsylvania, US

=== Sports ===
- Albanian Rugby League
- Auckland Rugby League
- Australian Rugby League

== Transportation ==
- Airport Rail Link (Bangkok), Thailand
- Autolinee Regionali Luganesi, Swiss bus company
- Arlesey railway station (National Rail code), UK
- Armour Refrigerator Line, a refrigerator car line
- Arly Airport (IATA airport code), Burkina Faso
- Arriva Rail London, operators of London Overground rail services

== Computing ==
- Authority revocation list, in cryptosystems

== Other ==
- Argyll, historic county in Scotland, Chapman code
- ADP-ribosylation factor-like protein, as in ARL3, ARL8A, ARL8B
