= ARF4 =

Protein-coding gene in the species Homo sapiens

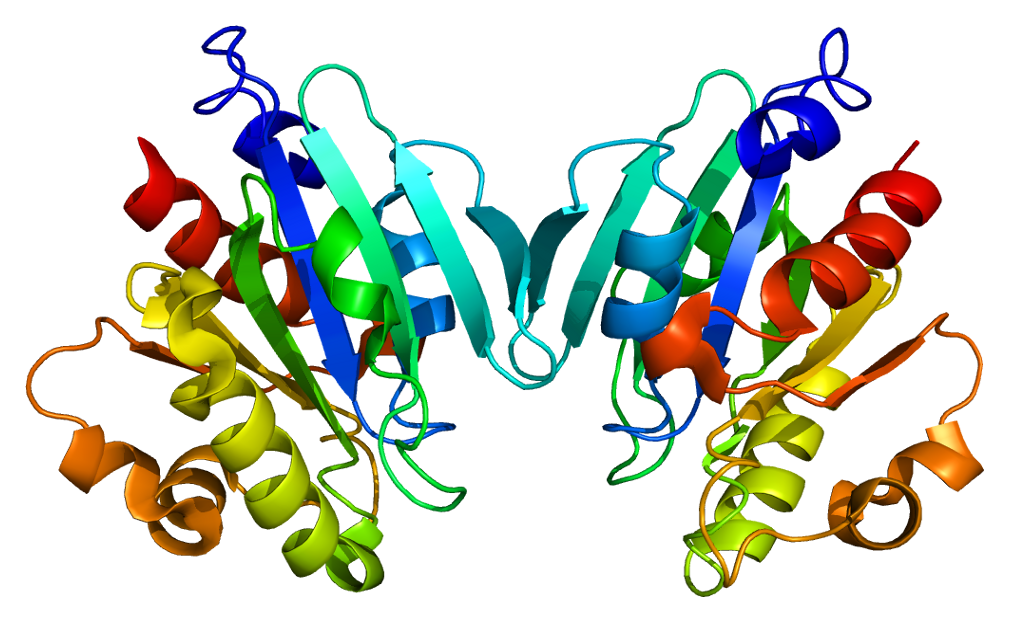

Identifiers
- Aliases: ARF4, ARF2, ADP ribosylation factor 4
- External IDs: OMIM: 601177; MGI: 99433; GeneCards: ARF4
Available structures
PDB	Ortholog search: PDBe RCSB
PDB	List of PDB id codes 1Z6X

Gene location (Human)
Chr.	Chromosome 3 (human)
Band	3p14.3	Start	57,571,363 bp
Band	3p14.3	End	57,598,220 bp

Gene location (Mouse)
Chr.	Chromosome 14 (mouse)
Band	14 A3|14 16.09 cM	Start	26,359,229 bp
Band	14 A3|14 16.09 cM	End	26,386,239 bp
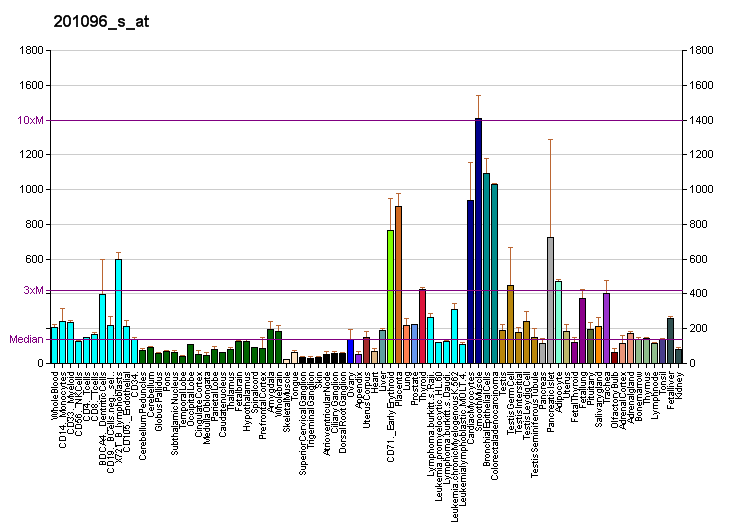

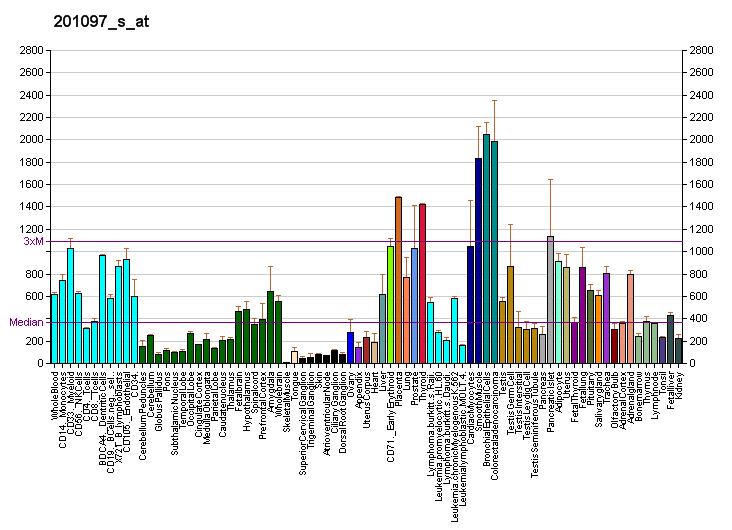
RNA expression pattern
Bgee	Human / Mouse (ortholog); Top expressed in: tibia; parietal pleura; visceral pleura; germinal epithelium; corpus epididymis; mucosa of sigmoid colon; pancreatic epithelial cell; parotid gland; epithelium of nasopharynx; stromal cell of endometrium / Top expressed in: genital tubercle; tail of embryo; ventricular zone; right kidney; esophagus; embryo; embryo; lip; yolk sac; dentate gyrus of hippocampal formation granule cell; More reference expression data
BioGPS	More reference expression data
Gene ontology
Molecular function	nucleotide binding; epidermal growth factor receptor binding; GTP binding; protein binding; GTPase activity
Cellular component	cytosol; Golgi apparatus; membrane; dendritic spine; intracellular anatomical structure; ruffle membrane; extracellular exosome; extracellular matrix; cytoplasm; plasma membrane; glutamatergic synapse
Biological process	protein ADP-ribosylation; small GTPase mediated signal transduction; negative regulation of apoptotic process; regulation of reactive oxygen species metabolic process; endoplasmic reticulum to Golgi vesicle-mediated transport; activation of phospholipase D activity; protein transport; cell migration; vesicle-mediated transport; positive regulation of transcription by RNA polymerase II; retrograde vesicle-mediated transport, Golgi to endoplasmic reticulum; transport; dendritic spine development; intracellular protein transport; Golgi to plasma membrane transport; epidermal growth factor receptor signaling pathway; brain development; learning; apical protein localization; establishment or maintenance of epithelial cell apical/basal polarity; response to axon injury; regulation of synapse organization; protein localization to cilium; regulation of postsynapse organization
Sources:Amigo / QuickGO
Orthologs
Databases	NCBI: entry; OMA: entry
Species	Human	Mouse
Entrez	378	11843
Ensembl	ENSG00000168374	ENSMUSG00000021877
UniProt	P18085	P61750
RefSeq (mRNA)	NM_001660	NM_007479
RefSeq (protein)	NP_001651	NP_031505
Location (UCSC)	Chr 3: 57.57 – 57.6 Mb	Chr 14: 26.36 – 26.39 Mb
PubMed search
- Wikidata
View/Edit Human	View/Edit Mouse

ADP-ribosylation factor 4 is a protein that in humans is encoded by the ARF4 gene.

== Gene ==
ADP-ribosylation factor 4 (ARF4) is a member of the human ARF gene family.

The gene products include 5 ARF proteins and 11 ARF-like proteins and constitute 1 family of the RAS superfamily. The ARF proteins are categorized as class I (ARF1 and ARF3), class II (ARF4, this gene and ARF5) and class III (ARF6). The members of each class share a common gene organization. The ARF4 gene spans approximately 12kb and contains six exons and five introns. The ARF4 is the most divergent member of the human ARFs. Conflicting Map positions at 3p14 or 3p21 have been reported for this gene.

== Function ==
These genes encode small Guanine-nucleotide binding proteins (G proteins) that play a role in vesicular trafficking and as activators of phospholipase D.

== Clinical significance ==
ARF4 stimulates the ADP-ribosyltransferase activity of cholera toxin.

== Interactions ==
ARF4 has been shown to interact with Epidermal growth factor receptor and with RVxP motifs.
