= IQSEC1 =

Protein-coding gene in the species Homo sapiens

Identifiers
- Aliases: IQSEC1, ARF-GEP100, ARFGEP100, BRAG2, GEP100, IQ motif and Sec7 domain 1, IQ motif and Sec7 domain ArfGEF 1, IDDSSBA
- External IDs: OMIM: 610166; MGI: 1196356; GeneCards: IQSEC1
Available structures
PDB	Ortholog search: PDBe RCSB
PDB	List of PDB id codes 3QWM, 4C0A

Gene location (Human)
Chr.	Chromosome 3 (human)
Band	3p25.2-p25.1	Start	12,897,043 bp
Band	3p25.2-p25.1	End	13,283,281 bp

Gene location (Mouse)
Chr.	Chromosome 6 (mouse)
Band	6 D1|6 40.16 cM	Start	90,633,070 bp
Band	6 D1|6 40.16 cM	End	90,965,667 bp
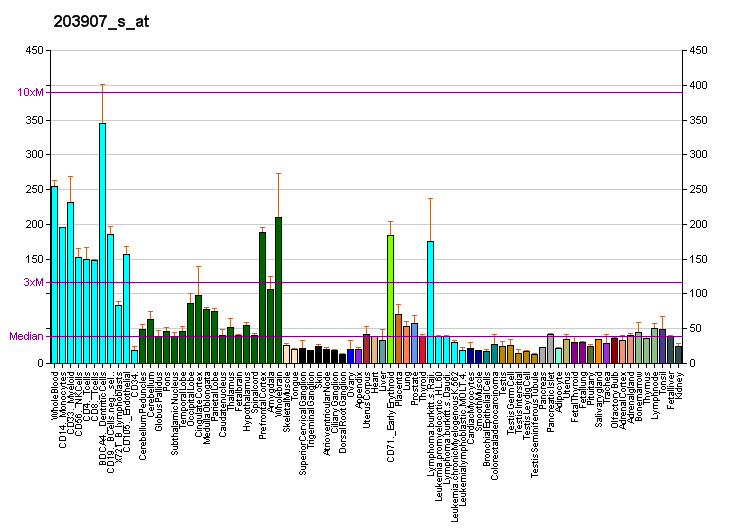

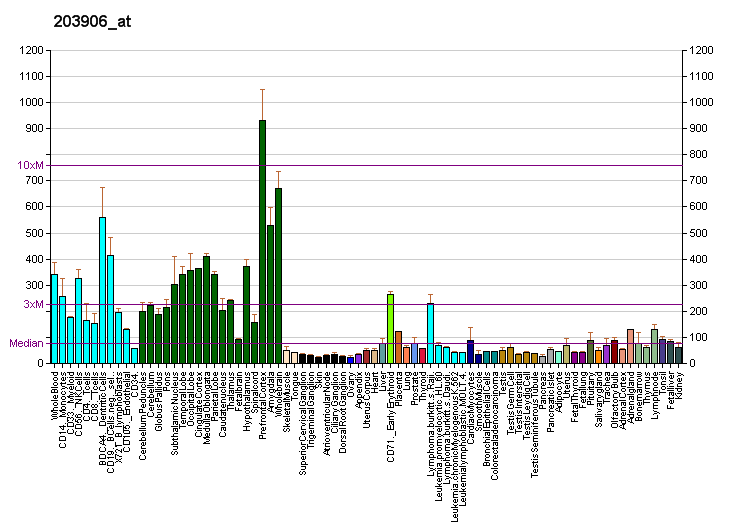
RNA expression pattern
Bgee	Human / Mouse (ortholog); Top expressed in: Brodmann area 46; postcentral gyrus; superior frontal gyrus; right frontal lobe; prefrontal cortex; cingulate gyrus; anterior cingulate cortex; Brodmann area 9; middle temporal gyrus; primary visual cortex / Top expressed in: granulocyte; primary visual cortex; superior frontal gyrus; dentate gyrus of hippocampal formation granule cell; neural layer of retina; cerebellar cortex; yolk sac; pontine nuclei; deep cerebellar nuclei; central gray substance of midbrain; More reference expression data
BioGPS	More reference expression data
Gene ontology
Molecular function	guanyl-nucleotide exchange factor activity; lipid binding; protein binding
Cellular component	cytoplasm; membrane; nucleus; nucleolus; intracellular membrane-bounded organelle
Biological process	positive regulation of GTPase activity; regulation of ARF protein signal transduction; actin cytoskeleton organization; positive regulation of keratinocyte migration; positive regulation of adherens junction organization
Sources:Amigo / QuickGO
Orthologs
Databases	NCBI: entry; OMA: entry
Species	Human	Mouse
Entrez	9922	232227
Ensembl	ENSG00000144711	ENSMUSG00000034312
UniProt	Q6DN90	Q8R0S2
RefSeq (mRNA)	NM_001134382; NM_014869; NM_001330619; NM_001376938	NM_001134383; NM_001134384; NM_182784; NM_001356440
RefSeq (protein)	NP_001127854; NP_001317548; NP_055684; NP_001363867	NP_001127855; NP_001127856; NP_001343369
Location (UCSC)	Chr 3: 12.9 – 13.28 Mb	Chr 6: 90.63 – 90.97 Mb
PubMed search
- Wikidata
View/Edit Human	View/Edit Mouse

IQ motif and SEC7 domain-containing protein 1 also known as ARF-GEP_{100} (ADP-Ribosylation Factor - Guanine nucleotide-Exchange Protein - 100-kDa) is a protein that in humans is encoded by the IQSEC1 gene.

== Function ==
The ARF-GEP_{100} protein is involved in signal transduction. It is a guanine nucleotide exchange factor that promotes binding of GTP to ADP ribosylation factor protein ARF6 and to a lesser extent ARF1 and ARF5. This activates the ADP-ribosylation activity of the target protein and cause it to modify its substrates. ARF-GEP_{100}, through activation of ARF6, is therefore involved in the control of processes such as endocytosis of plasma membrane proteins, E-cadherin recycling and actin cytoskeleton remodeling. ARF-GEP_{100} appears particularly important in regulating cell adhesion, with reductions in the level of this protein causing enhanced spreading and attachment of cells.

It is highly expressed in the prefrontal cortex, and throughout the rest of the brain, and is believed to have a role in learning and memory, having been detected as phosphorylated in a phospho screen of the PSD.
