= IQSEC3 =

Protein-coding gene in humans

Identifiers
- Aliases: IQSEC3, IQ motif and Sec7 domain 3, IQ motif and Sec7 domain ArfGEF 3
- External IDs: OMIM: 612118; MGI: 2677208; GeneCards: IQSEC3

Gene location (Human)
Chr.	Chromosome 12 (human)
Band	12p13.33	Start	66,767 bp
Band	12p13.33	End	178,455 bp

Gene location (Mouse)
Chr.	Chromosome 6 (mouse)
Band	6|6 F1	Start	121,349,892 bp
Band	6|6 F1	End	121,450,637 bp
RNA expression pattern
Bgee	Human / Mouse (ortholog); Top expressed in: right hemisphere of cerebellum; right frontal lobe; cingulate gyrus; anterior cingulate cortex; amygdala; Brodmann area 9; prefrontal cortex; cerebellar vermis; hypothalamus; nucleus accumbens / Top expressed in: central gray substance of midbrain; superior colliculus; suprachiasmatic nucleus; neural layer of retina; dorsal tegmental nucleus; inferior colliculi; pontine nuclei; primary visual cortex; deep cerebellar nuclei; medial vestibular nucleus; More reference expression data
BioGPS	n/a
Orthologs
Databases	NCBI: entry; OMA: entry
Species	Human	Mouse
Entrez	440073	243621
Ensembl	ENSG00000262607; ENSG00000120645	ENSMUSG00000040797
UniProt	Q9UPP2	Q3TES0
RefSeq (mRNA)	NM_001170738; NM_015232	NM_001033354; NM_001289685
RefSeq (protein)	NP_001164209; NP_056047	NP_001028526; NP_001276614
Location (UCSC)	Chr 12: 0.07 – 0.18 Mb	Chr 6: 121.35 – 121.45 Mb
PubMed search
- Wikidata
View/Edit Human	View/Edit Mouse

IQ motif and SEC7 domain-containing protein 3 is a protein that in humans is encoded by the IQSEC3 gene.

It contains an IQ domain, followed by a SEC7 and then a PH. It functions as an ARF-GEF for the ARF family of GTPases, which is to say that it causes GDP to release, and GTP to bind, thereby activating the ARF protein.

It is highly expressed in the brain, particularly in the amygdala, and is known to have a role in learning.

In a largescale phospho screening of the PSD, it was found to be phosphorylated following activation of the NMDAR complex.

IQSEC3 was originally known as 'KIAA1110', under which name it was found to act as a GEF for Arf1 but not Arf6. It is related to the other Arf-GEF protein IQSEC1.
