= ICA1 =

Gene of the species Homo sapiens

Identifiers
- Aliases: ICA1, ICA69, ICAp69, islet cell autoantigen 1
- External IDs: OMIM: 147625; MGI: 96391; GeneCards: ICA1

Gene location (Mouse)
| Chr. | Chromosome 6 (mouse) |
| Band | 6 A1|6 4.38 cM | Start | 8,630,527 bp |
| Band | 6 A1|6 4.38 cM | End | 8,778,488 bp |
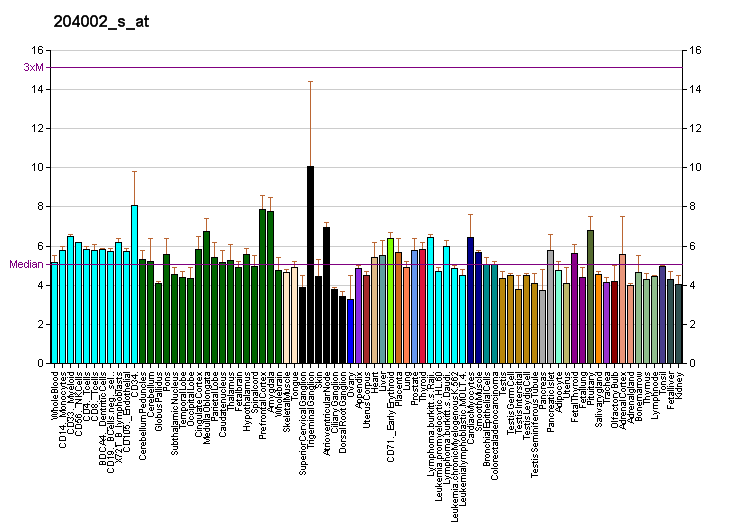

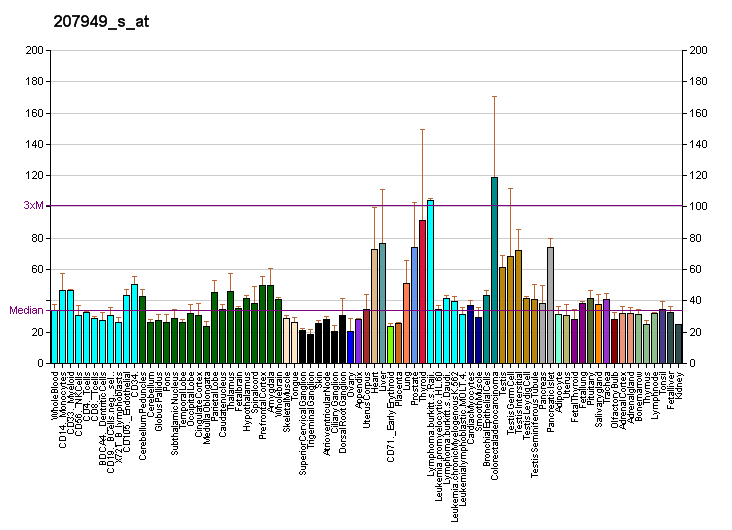

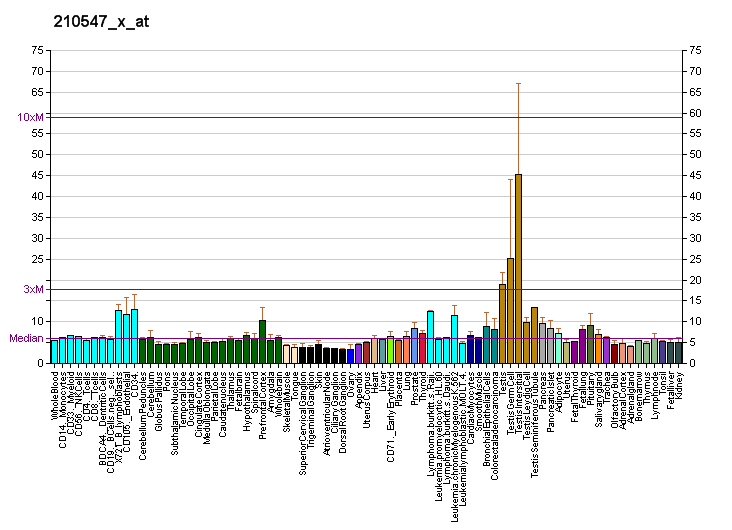
RNA expression pattern
| Bgee | Human / Mouse (ortholog); n/a / Top expressed in: spermatid; saccule; seminiferous tubule; lacrimal gland; islet of Langerhans; zygote; submandibular gland; otic vesicle; seminal vesicula; parotid gland |
| BioGPS | More reference expression data |
Gene ontology
| Molecular function | protein binding; protein domain specific binding; molecular function |
| Cellular component | Golgi membrane; cell junction; transport vesicle membrane; synapse; synaptic vesicle membrane; secretory granule membrane; membrane; cytoplasmic vesicle; cytoplasm; Golgi apparatus; cytosol; intracellular membrane-bounded organelle |
| Biological process | neurotransmitter transport; regulation of insulin secretion |
Sources:Amigo / QuickGO
Orthologs
| Databases | NCBI: entry; OMA: entry |
| Species | Human | Mouse |
| Entrez | 3382 | 15893 |
| Ensembl | ENSG00000003147 | ENSMUSG00000062995 |
| UniProt | Q05084 | P97411 |
| RefSeq (mRNA) | NM_001136020; NM_001276478; NM_004968; NM_022307; NM_022308 | NM_001252266; NM_010492 |
| RefSeq (protein) | NP_001129492; NP_001263407; NP_004959; NP_071682; NP_001337748 NP_001337749; NP_001337750; NP_001337752; NP_001337753; NP_001337754; NP_001337755; NP_001337756; NP_001337757; NP_001337758; NP_001337759; NP_001337760; NP_001337761; NP_001337762; NP_001337763; NP_001337764; NP_001337765; NP_001337766; NP_001337767 | NP_001239195; NP_034622 |
| Location (UCSC) | n/a | Chr 6: 8.63 – 8.78 Mb |
| PubMed search |
- Wikidata
| View/Edit Human | View/Edit Mouse |

Islet cell autoantigen 1 is a protein that in humans is encoded by the ICA1 gene.

This gene encodes a protein with an arfaptin homology domain that is found both in the cytosol and as membrane-bound form on the Golgi complex and immature secretory granules. This protein is believed to be an autoantigen in insulin-dependent diabetes mellitus and primary Sjögren's syndrome. Alternatively spliced variants which encode different protein isoforms have been described; however, not all variants have been fully characterized.
