= ARFIP1 =

Protein-coding gene in the species Homo sapiens

Identifiers
- Aliases: ARFIP1, HSU52521, ADP ribosylation factor interacting protein 1
- External IDs: OMIM: 605928; MGI: 1277120; GeneCards: ARFIP1

Gene location (Human)
Chr.	Chromosome 4 (human)
Band	4q31.3	Start	152,779,937 bp
Band	4q31.3	End	152,918,463 bp

Gene location (Mouse)
Chr.	Chromosome 3 (mouse)
Band	3|3 F1	Start	84,403,400 bp
Band	3|3 F1	End	84,489,932 bp
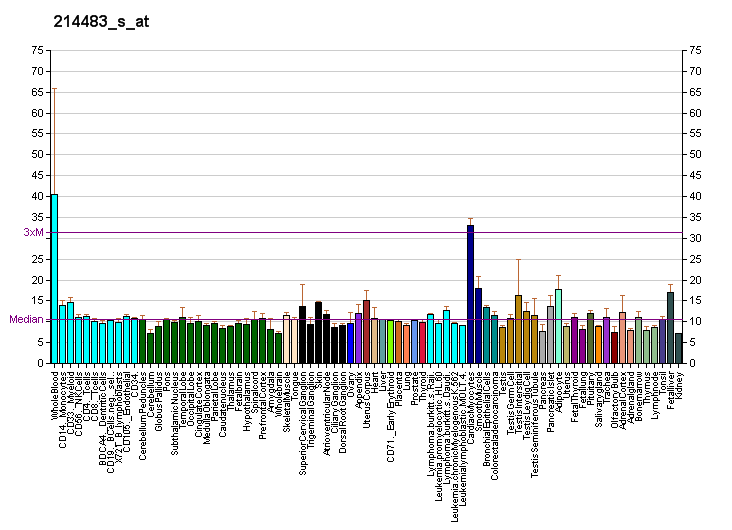

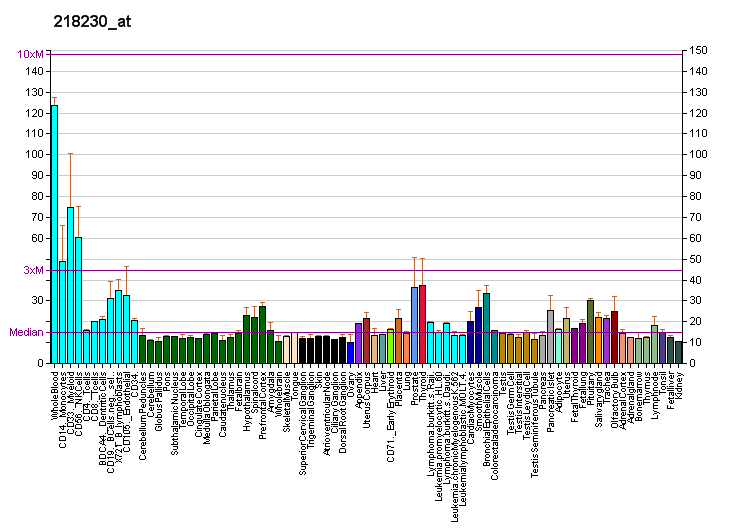
RNA expression pattern
Bgee	Human / Mouse (ortholog); Top expressed in: secondary oocyte; epithelium of nasopharynx; visceral pleura; tibia; parietal pleura; mucosa of sigmoid colon; Achilles tendon; germinal epithelium; amniotic fluid; endometrium / Top expressed in: secondary oocyte; zygote; primary oocyte; granulocyte; jejunum; ileum; stomach; duodenum; ovary; placenta; More reference expression data
BioGPS	More reference expression data
Gene ontology
Molecular function	protein domain specific binding; phosphatidylinositol-4-phosphate binding; phospholipid binding
Cellular component	cytosol; trans-Golgi network membrane; Golgi membrane; cytoplasm
Biological process	intracellular protein transport; regulation of Arp2/3 complex-mediated actin nucleation; regulation of protein secretion
Sources:Amigo / QuickGO
Orthologs
Databases	NCBI: entry; OMA: entry
Species	Human	Mouse
Entrez	27236	99889
Ensembl	ENSG00000164144	ENSMUSG00000074513
UniProt	P53367	G5E8V9
RefSeq (mRNA)	NM_001025593; NM_001025595; NM_001287431; NM_001287432; NM_001287433 NM_014447	NM_001081093; NM_001293801
RefSeq (protein)	NP_001020764; NP_001020766; NP_001274360; NP_001274361; NP_001274362 NP_055262	NP_001074562; NP_001280730
Location (UCSC)	Chr 4: 152.78 – 152.92 Mb	Chr 3: 84.4 – 84.49 Mb
PubMed search
- Wikidata
View/Edit Human	View/Edit Mouse

Arfaptin-1 is a protein that in humans is encoded by the ARFIP1 gene.

== Interactions ==
ARFIP1 has been shown to interact with ARF3.
