= ARL4D =

Protein-coding gene in the species Homo sapiens

Identifiers
- Aliases: ARL4D, ARF4L, ARL6, ADP ribosylation factor like GTPase 4D
- External IDs: OMIM: 600732; MGI: 1933155; GeneCards: ARL4D

Gene location (Human)
Chr.	Chromosome 17 (human)
Band	17q21.31	Start	43,398,993 bp
Band	17q21.31	End	43,401,137 bp

Gene location (Mouse)
Chr.	Chromosome 11 (mouse)
Band	11|11 D	Start	101,556,367 bp
Band	11|11 D	End	101,558,658 bp
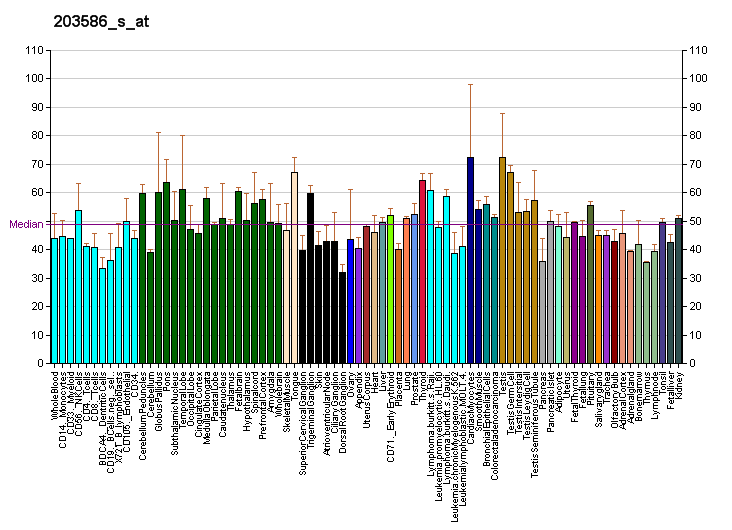
RNA expression pattern
Bgee	Human / Mouse (ortholog); Top expressed in: mucosa of pharynx; vena cava; oocyte; testicle; parotid gland; gingival epithelium; right lobe of liver; left lobe of thyroid gland; nipple; olfactory zone of nasal mucosa / Top expressed in: decidua; gastrula; neural layer of retina; medial ganglionic eminence; seminal vesicula; left lobe of liver; yolk sac; retinal pigment epithelium; myocardium of ventricle; islet of Langerhans; More reference expression data
BioGPS	More reference expression data
Gene ontology
Molecular function	nucleotide binding; GTP binding; protein binding; GTPase activity
Cellular component	cytoplasm; plasma membrane; nucleolus; intracellular anatomical structure; membrane; nucleus
Biological process	protein secretion; intracellular protein transport; vesicle-mediated transport
Sources:Amigo / QuickGO
Orthologs
Databases	NCBI: entry; OMA: entry
Species	Human	Mouse
Entrez	379	80981
Ensembl	ENSG00000175906	ENSMUSG00000034936
UniProt	P49703	Q99PE9
RefSeq (mRNA)	NM_001661	NM_025404
RefSeq (protein)	NP_001652	NP_079680
Location (UCSC)	Chr 17: 43.4 – 43.4 Mb	Chr 11: 101.56 – 101.56 Mb
PubMed search
- Wikidata
View/Edit Human	View/Edit Mouse

ADP-ribosylation factor-like protein 4D is a protein that in humans is encoded by the ARL4D gene.

== Function ==
ADP-ribosylation factor 4D is a member of the ADP-ribosylation factor family of GTP-binding proteins. ARL4D is closely similar to ARL4A and ARL4C and each has a nuclear localization signal and an unusually high guanine nucleotide exchange rate. This protein may play a role in membrane-associated intracellular trafficking. Mutations in this gene have been associated with Bardet–Biedl syndrome (BBS).
