= Importin subunit alpha-3 =

Protein-coding gene in the species Homo sapiens

KPNA4

Identifiers
- Aliases: KPNA4, IPOA3, QIP1, SRP3, karyopherin subunit alpha 4
- External IDs: OMIM: 602970; MGI: 1100848; GeneCards: KPNA4
Available structures
PDB	Ortholog search: PDBe RCSB
PDB	List of PDB id codes 4UAE

Gene location (Human)
Chr.	Chromosome 3 (human)
Band	3q25.33	Start	160,495,007 bp
Band	3q25.33	End	160,565,571 bp

Gene location (Mouse)
Chr.	Chromosome 3 (mouse)
Band	3|3 E1	Start	68,974,482 bp
Band	3|3 E1	End	69,034,446 bp
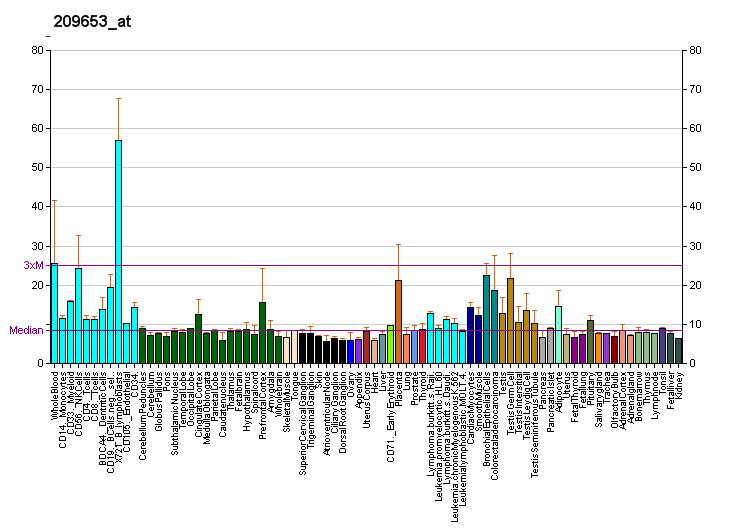
RNA expression pattern
Bgee	Human / Mouse (ortholog); Top expressed in: biceps brachii; Skeletal muscle tissue of biceps brachii; Skeletal muscle tissue of rectus abdominis; tail of epididymis; endothelial cell; body of tongue; right ventricle; corpus epididymis; oral cavity; saphenous vein / Top expressed in: spermatocyte; intercostal muscle; external carotid artery; internal carotid artery; triceps brachii muscle; left lung lobe; spermatid; abdominal wall; epithelium of lens; sternocleidomastoid muscle; More reference expression data
BioGPS	More reference expression data
Gene ontology
Molecular function	protein binding; nuclear localization sequence binding; nuclear import signal receptor activity
Cellular component	cytoplasm; cytosol; nuclear pore; nucleoplasm; nucleus; nuclear membrane
Biological process	protein transport; response to hydrogen peroxide; protein import into nucleus; NLS-bearing protein import into nucleus; modulation by virus of host cellular process; viral process
Sources:Amigo / QuickGO
Orthologs
Databases	NCBI: entry; OMA: entry
Species	Human	Mouse
Entrez	3840	16649
Ensembl	ENSG00000186432	ENSMUSG00000027782
UniProt	O00629	O35343
RefSeq (mRNA)	NM_002268	NM_008467
RefSeq (protein)	NP_002259	NP_032493
Location (UCSC)	Chr 3: 160.5 – 160.57 Mb	Chr 3: 68.97 – 69.03 Mb
PubMed search
- Wikidata
View/Edit Human	View/Edit Mouse

Importin subunit alpha-3, also known as karyopherin subunit alpha-4, is a protein that in humans is encoded by the KPNA4 gene.

== Function ==
The nuclear import of karyophilic proteins is directed by short amino acid sequences termed nuclear localization signals (NLSs). Karyopherins, or importins, are cytoplasmic proteins that recognize NLSs and dock NLS-containing proteins to the nuclear pore complex. The protein encoded by this gene shares the sequence similarity with Xenopus importin-alpha and Saccharomyces cerevisiae Srp1. This protein is found to interact with the NLSs of DNA helicase Q1 and SV40 T antigen.

== Interactions ==
KPNA4 has been shown to interact with RECQL and STAT3.
