= Arfaptin domain =

Protein domain

Arfaptin
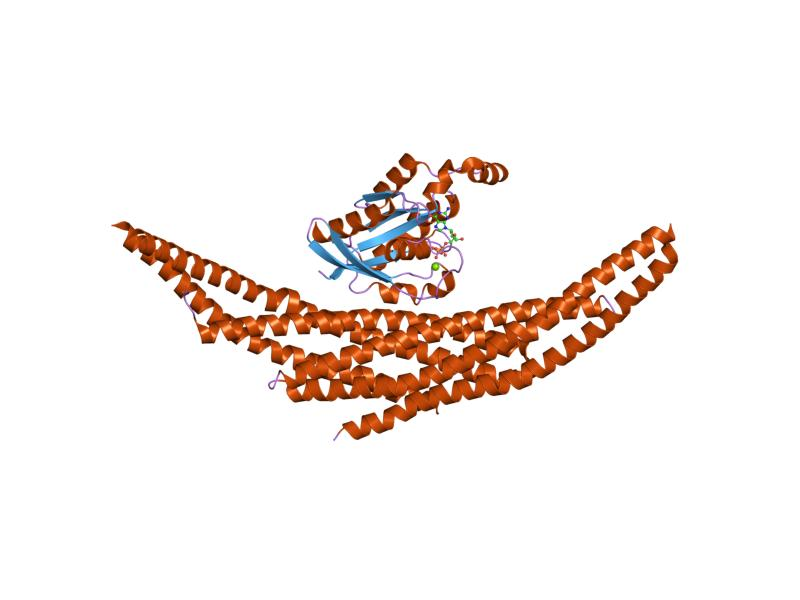
- crystal structure analysis of rac1-gdp complexed with arfaptin (p21)

Identifiers
- Symbol: Arfaptin
- Pfam: PF06456
- Pfam clan: CL0145
- InterPro: IPR010504
- SCOP2: 1i4l / SCOPe / SUPFAM
- CDD: cd00011
Available protein structures:
- PDB: IPR010504 PF06456 (ECOD; PDBsum)
- AlphaFold: IPR010504; PF06456

In molecular biology, the arfaptin domain is a protein domain which interacts with ARF1, a small GTPase involved in vesicle budding at the Golgi complex and immature secretory granules. The structure of arfaptin shows that upon binding to a small GTPase, arfaptin forms an elongated, crescent-shaped dimer of three-helix coiled-coils. The N-terminal region of ICA69 is similar to arfaptin.
