= Importin subunit alpha-1 =

Protein-coding gene in the species Homo sapiens

KPNA2
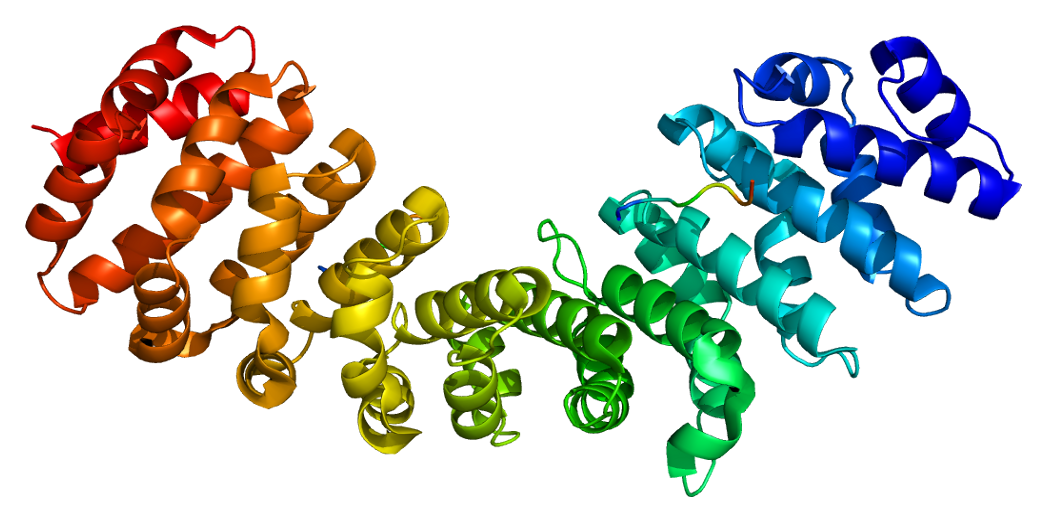

Identifiers
- Aliases: KPNA2, IPOA1, QIP2, RCH1, SRP1alpha, Karyopherin alpha 2, SRP1-alpha, karyopherin subunit alpha 2, PTAC58
- External IDs: OMIM: 600685; MGI: 103561; GeneCards: KPNA2
Available structures
PDB	Ortholog search: PDBe RCSB
PDB	List of PDB id codes 1EFX, 1QGK, 1QGR, 3FEX, 3FEY, 3WPT, 4E4V, 4WV6

Gene location (Human)
Chr.	Chromosome 17 (human)
Band	17q24.2	Start	68,035,636 bp
Band	17q24.2	End	68,047,364 bp

Gene location (Mouse)
Chr.	Chromosome 11 (mouse)
Band	11|11 E1	Start	106,879,455 bp
Band	11|11 E1	End	106,890,367 bp
RNA expression pattern
Bgee	Human / Mouse (ortholog); Top expressed in: ventricular zone; gonad; left testis; right testis; ganglionic eminence; testicle; stromal cell of endometrium; appendix; lymph node; islet of Langerhans / Top expressed in: zygote; secondary oocyte; primary oocyte; tail of embryo; genital tubercle; ventricular zone; spermatid; morula; spermatocyte; neural tube; More reference expression data
BioGPS	n/a
Gene ontology
Molecular function	histone deacetylase binding; protein binding; nuclear localization sequence binding; RNA binding; nuclear import signal receptor activity
Cellular component	membrane; nuclear pore; nucleoplasm; nucleus; cytoplasm; cytosol; host cell; extrinsic component of postsynaptic specialization membrane; glutamatergic synapse
Biological process	regulation of DNA recombination; protein import into nucleus; DNA metabolic process; protein transport; viral process; NLS-bearing protein import into nucleus; modulation by virus of host cellular process; intracellular transport of virus; transport; postsynapse to nucleus signaling pathway; entry of viral genome into host nucleus through nuclear pore complex via importin; positive regulation of viral life cycle
Sources:Amigo / QuickGO
Orthologs
Databases	NCBI: entry; OMA: entry
Species	Human	Mouse
Entrez	3838	16647
Ensembl	ENSG00000182481	ENSMUSG00000018362
UniProt	P52292	P52293
RefSeq (mRNA)	NM_002266; NM_001320611	NM_010655
RefSeq (protein)	NP_001307540; NP_002257	NP_034785
Location (UCSC)	Chr 17: 68.04 – 68.05 Mb	Chr 11: 106.88 – 106.89 Mb
PubMed search
- Wikidata
View/Edit Human	View/Edit Mouse

Importin subunit alpha-1 is a protein that in humans is encoded by the KPNA2 gene.

The import of proteins into the nucleus is a process that involves at least 2 steps. The first is an energy-independent docking of the protein to the nuclear envelope and the second is an energy-dependent translocation through the nuclear pore complex. Imported proteins require a nuclear localization sequence (NLS) which generally consists of a short region of basic amino acids or 2 such regions spaced about 10 amino acids apart. Proteins involved in the first step of nuclear import are members of the alpha importin family of karyopherins such as importin subunit alpha-1. These include the Xenopus protein importin and its yeast homolog, SRP1 (a suppressor of certain temperature-sensitive mutations of RNA polymerase I in Saccharomyces cerevisiae), which bind to the NLS. KPNA2 protein interacts with the NLSs of DNA helicase Q1 and SV40 T antigen and may be involved in the nuclear transport of proteins. KPNA2 also may play a role in V(D)J recombination

== Interactions ==
Karyopherin alpha 2 has been shown to interact with:

- ARL4A
- ITK,
- KPNB1,
- PLAG1,
- RECQL, and
- SGK.
