= ARFIP2 =

Protein-coding gene in the species Homo sapiens

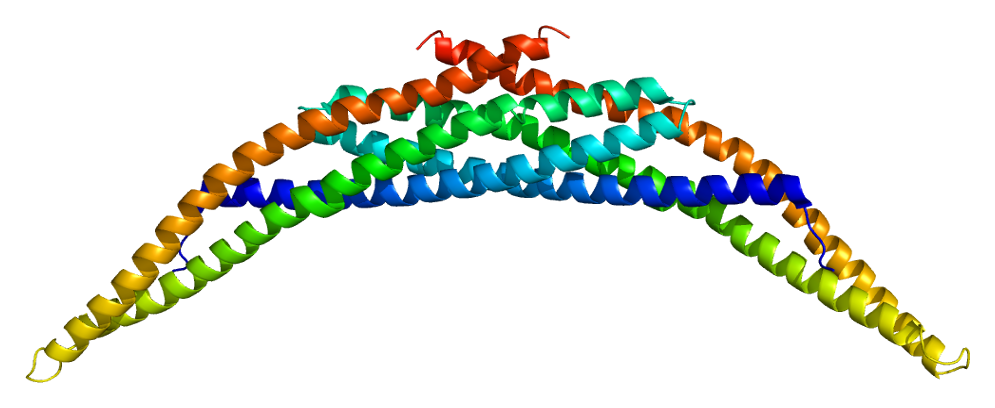

Identifiers
- Aliases: ARFIP2, POR1, ADP ribosylation factor interacting protein 2
- External IDs: OMIM: 601638; MGI: 1924182; GeneCards: ARFIP2
Available structures
PDB	Ortholog search: PDBe RCSB
PDB	List of PDB id codes 1I49, 1I4D, 1I4L, 1I4T, 4DCN

Gene location (Human)
Chr.	Chromosome 11 (human)
Band	11p15.4	Start	6,474,683 bp
Band	11p15.4	End	6,481,479 bp

Gene location (Mouse)
Chr.	Chromosome 7 (mouse)
Band	7|7 E3	Start	105,283,410 bp
Band	7|7 E3	End	105,289,623 bp
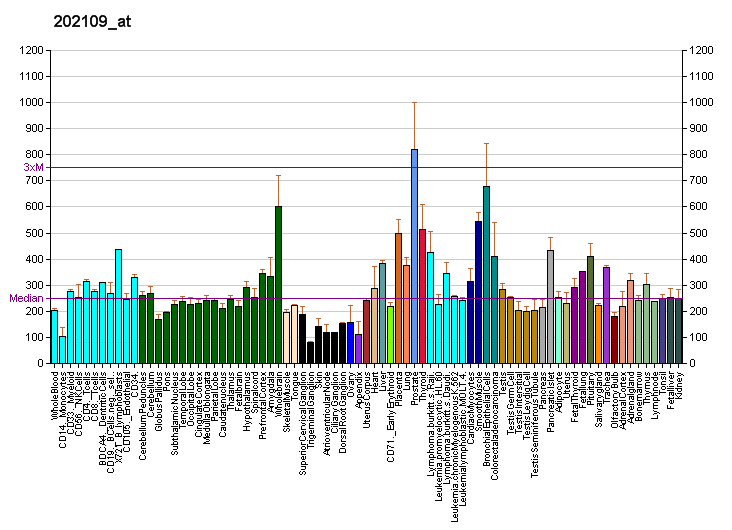
RNA expression pattern
Bgee	Human / Mouse (ortholog); Top expressed in: olfactory zone of nasal mucosa; beta cell; body of pancreas; anterior pituitary; body of stomach; right uterine tube; trachea; rectum; minor salivary glands; right lobe of thyroid gland / Top expressed in: dentate gyrus of hippocampal formation granule cell; neural layer of retina; lacrimal gland; superior frontal gyrus; pyloric antrum; genital tubercle; parotid gland; ventricular zone; tail of embryo; cerebellar cortex; More reference expression data
BioGPS	More reference expression data
Gene ontology
Molecular function	phosphatidylinositol-4-phosphate binding; protein domain specific binding; protein binding; GTP binding; identical protein binding; cadherin binding; GTP-dependent protein binding; phospholipid binding
Cellular component	cell cortex; trans-Golgi network membrane; plasma membrane; ruffle; cytosol; cytoplasm
Biological process	ruffle organization; small GTPase mediated signal transduction; actin cytoskeleton organization; regulation of Arp2/3 complex-mediated actin nucleation; lamellipodium assembly; intracellular protein transport
Sources:Amigo / QuickGO
Orthologs
Databases	NCBI: entry; OMA: entry
Species	Human	Mouse
Entrez	23647	76932
Ensembl	ENSG00000132254	ENSMUSG00000030881
UniProt	P53365	Q8K221
RefSeq (mRNA)	NM_001242854; NM_001242855; NM_001242856; NM_012402	NM_029802
RefSeq (protein)	NP_001229783; NP_001229784; NP_001229785; NP_036534; NP_001357335 NP_001357337; NP_001357338; NP_001357340; NP_001357341; NP_001357342; NP_001363487; NP_001363488; NP_001363489; NP_001363490; NP_001363491; NP_001363492; NP_001363493	NP_084078
Location (UCSC)	Chr 11: 6.47 – 6.48 Mb	Chr 7: 105.28 – 105.29 Mb
PubMed search
- Wikidata
View/Edit Human	View/Edit Mouse

Arfaptin-2 is a protein that in humans is encoded by the ARFIP2 gene.

== Interactions ==
ARFIP2 has been shown to interact with Arf6, ARF3, ARF5 and RAC1.
