= GGA3 =

Protein-coding gene in the species Homo sapiens

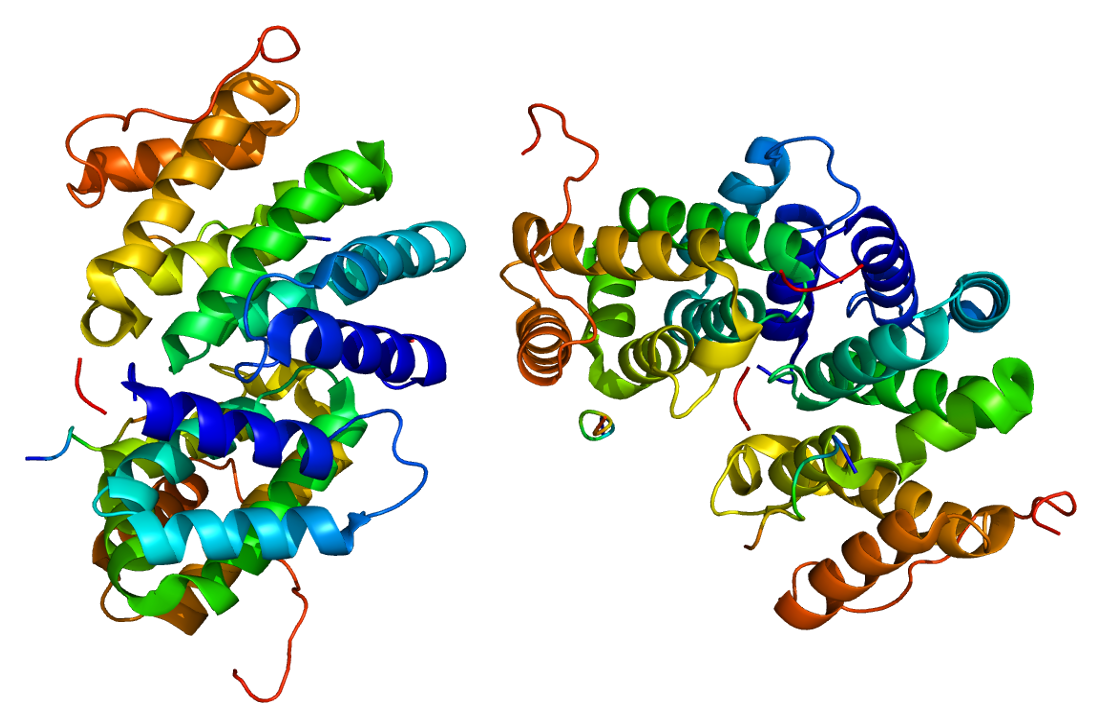
Available structures
PDB	Ortholog search: PDBe RCSB
PDB	List of PDB id codes 1JPL, 1JUQ, 1LF8, 1P4U, 1WR6, 1YD8

Identifiers
- Aliases: GGA3, golgi associated, gamma adaptin ear containing, ARF binding protein 3
- External IDs: OMIM: 606006; MGI: 2384159; HomoloGene: 121703; GeneCards: GGA3; OMA:GGA3 - orthologs

Gene location (Human)
Chr.	Chromosome 17 (human)
Band	17q25.1	Start	75,236,599 bp
Band	17q25.1	End	75,262,363 bp

Gene location (Mouse)
Chr.	Chromosome 11 (mouse)
Band	11|11 E2	Start	115,475,081 bp
Band	11|11 E2	End	115,494,877 bp
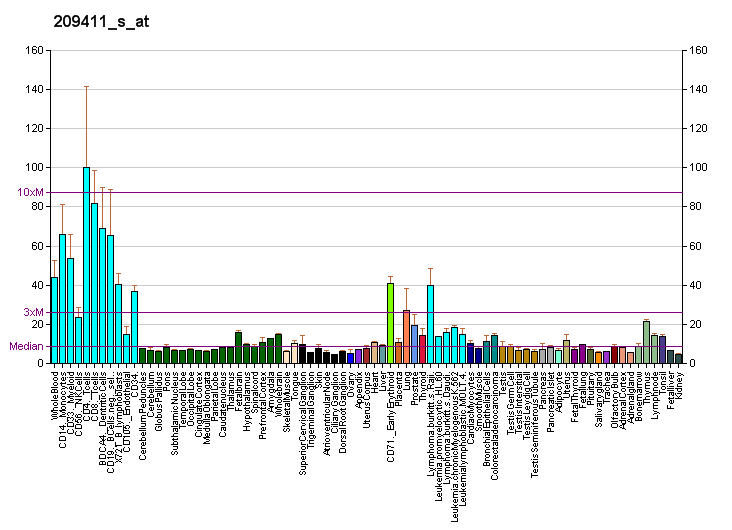

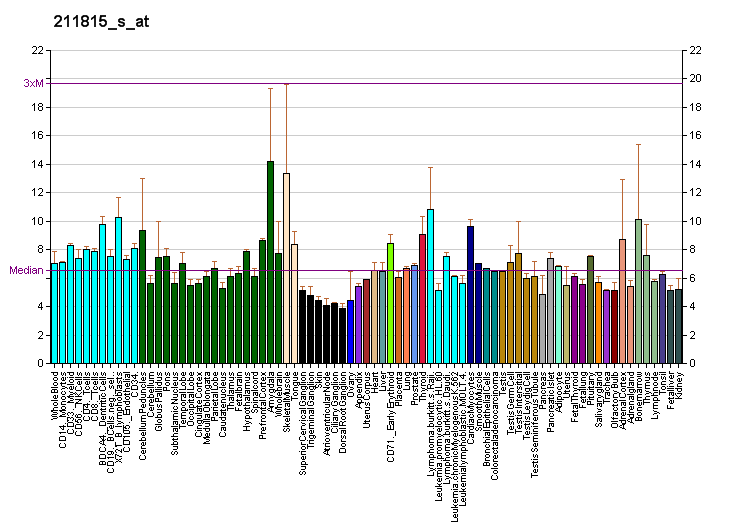
RNA expression pattern
Bgee	Human / Mouse (ortholog); Top expressed in: sural nerve; granulocyte; pylorus; gastric mucosa; spleen; monocyte; nipple; lymph node; upper lobe of left lung; fundus / Top expressed in: zygote; secondary oocyte; neural layer of retina; tail of embryo; primary visual cortex; superior frontal gyrus; cerebellar cortex; yolk sac; facial motor nucleus; genital tubercle; More reference expression data
BioGPS	More reference expression data
Gene ontology
Molecular function	protein binding; ubiquitin binding
Cellular component	endosome; trans-Golgi network; endosome membrane; intracellular anatomical structure; membrane; clathrin adaptor complex; Golgi apparatus; early endosome membrane; recycling endosome membrane; early endosome; recycling endosome
Biological process	protein transport; intracellular protein transport; positive regulation of protein catabolic process; vesicle-mediated transport; protein localization to lysosome; regulation of protein stability; protein destabilization; endocytic recycling; protein localization to cell surface; Golgi to plasma membrane protein transport; negative regulation of amyloid-beta formation
Sources:Amigo / QuickGO
Orthologs
Species	Human	Mouse
Entrez	23163	260302
Ensembl	ENSG00000125447	ENSMUSG00000020740
UniProt	Q9NZ52	Q8BMI3
RefSeq (mRNA)	NM_001172703; NM_001172704; NM_001291641; NM_001291642; NM_014001 NM_138619	NM_001252067; NM_173048
RefSeq (protein)	NP_001166174; NP_001166175; NP_001278570; NP_001278571; NP_054720 NP_619525	NP_001238996; NP_766636
Location (UCSC)	Chr 17: 75.24 – 75.26 Mb	Chr 11: 115.48 – 115.49 Mb
PubMed search
- Wikidata
View/Edit Human	View/Edit Mouse

ADP-ribosylation factor-binding protein GGA3 is a protein that in humans is encoded by the GGA3 gene.

This gene encodes a member of the Golgi-localized, gamma adaptin ear-containing, ARF-binding (GGA) family. This family includes ubiquitous coat proteins that regulate the trafficking of proteins between the trans-Golgi network and the lysosome. These proteins share an amino-terminal VHS domain which mediates sorting of the mannose 6-phosphate receptors at the trans-Golgi network. They also contain a carboxy-terminal region with homology to the ear domain of gamma-adaptins. Alternative splicing of this gene results in two transcript variants.

== Interactions ==
GGA3 has been shown to interact with ARF1 and ARF3.
