= EXOC5 =

Protein-coding gene in the species Homo sapiens

Identifiers
- Aliases: EXOC5, HSEC10, PRO1912, SEC10, SEC10L1, SEC10P, exocyst complex component 5
- External IDs: OMIM: 604469; MGI: 2145645; HomoloGene: 38195; GeneCards: EXOC5; OMA:EXOC5 - orthologs

Gene location (Human)
Chr.	Chromosome 14 (human)
Band	14q22.3	Start	57,200,507 bp
Band	14q22.3	End	57,268,905 bp

Gene location (Mouse)
Chr.	Chromosome 14 (mouse)
Band	14|14 C1	Start	49,241,547 bp
Band	14|14 C1	End	49,304,110 bp
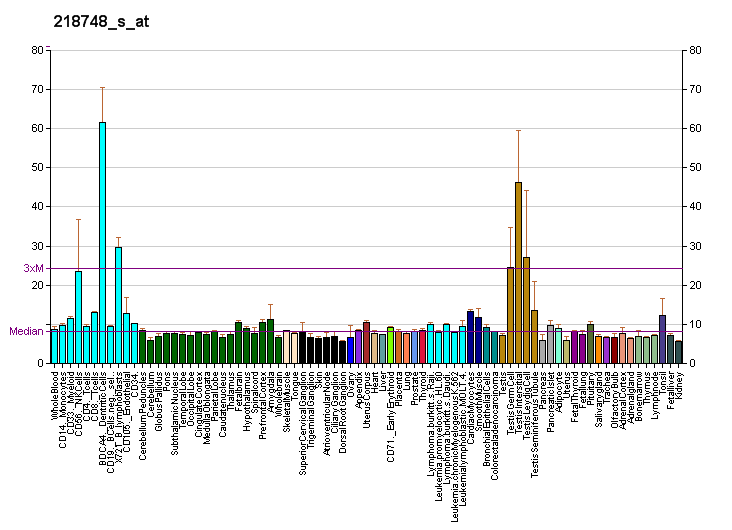
RNA expression pattern
Bgee	Human / Mouse (ortholog); Top expressed in: ganglionic eminence; corpus callosum; ventricular zone; cardiac muscle tissue of right atrium; myocardium of left ventricle; inferior ganglion of vagus nerve; Achilles tendon; epithelium of colon; subthalamic nucleus; secondary oocyte / Top expressed in: hand; superior cervical ganglion; medial ganglionic eminence; medullary collecting duct; gastrula; lumbar spinal ganglion; foot; cumulus cell; epithelium of lens; stroma of bone marrow; More reference expression data
BioGPS	More reference expression data
Gene ontology
Molecular function	protein N-terminus binding; protein binding
Cellular component	cytoplasm; cytosol; exocyst; midbody
Biological process	protein transport; vesicle docking; post-Golgi vesicle-mediated transport; exocytosis; Golgi to plasma membrane transport; establishment of planar polarity; homeostasis of number of cells within a tissue; protein localization to plasma membrane; epithelial cell apoptotic process; non-motile cilium assembly
Sources:Amigo / QuickGO
Orthologs
Species	Human	Mouse
Entrez	10640	105504
Ensembl	ENSG00000070367	ENSMUSG00000061244
UniProt	O00471	Q3TPX4
RefSeq (mRNA)	NM_006544	NM_207214
RefSeq (protein)	NP_006535	NP_997097
Location (UCSC)	Chr 14: 57.2 – 57.27 Mb	Chr 14: 49.24 – 49.3 Mb
PubMed search
- Wikidata
View/Edit Human	View/Edit Mouse

Exocyst complex component 5 is a protein that in humans is encoded by the EXOC5 gene.

== Function ==
The protein encoded by this gene is a component of the exocyst complex, a multiple protein complex essential for targeting exocytic vesicles to specific docking sites on the plasma membrane. Though best characterized in yeast, the component proteins and functions of exocyst complex have been demonstrated to be highly conserved in higher eukaryotes. At least eight components of the exocyst complex, including this protein, are found to interact with the actin cytoskeletal remodeling and vesicle transport machinery. The complex is also essential for the biogenesis of epithelial cell surface polarity.

== Interactions ==
EXOC5 has been shown to interact with Arf6.
