= RECQL =

Protein-coding gene in the species Homo sapiens

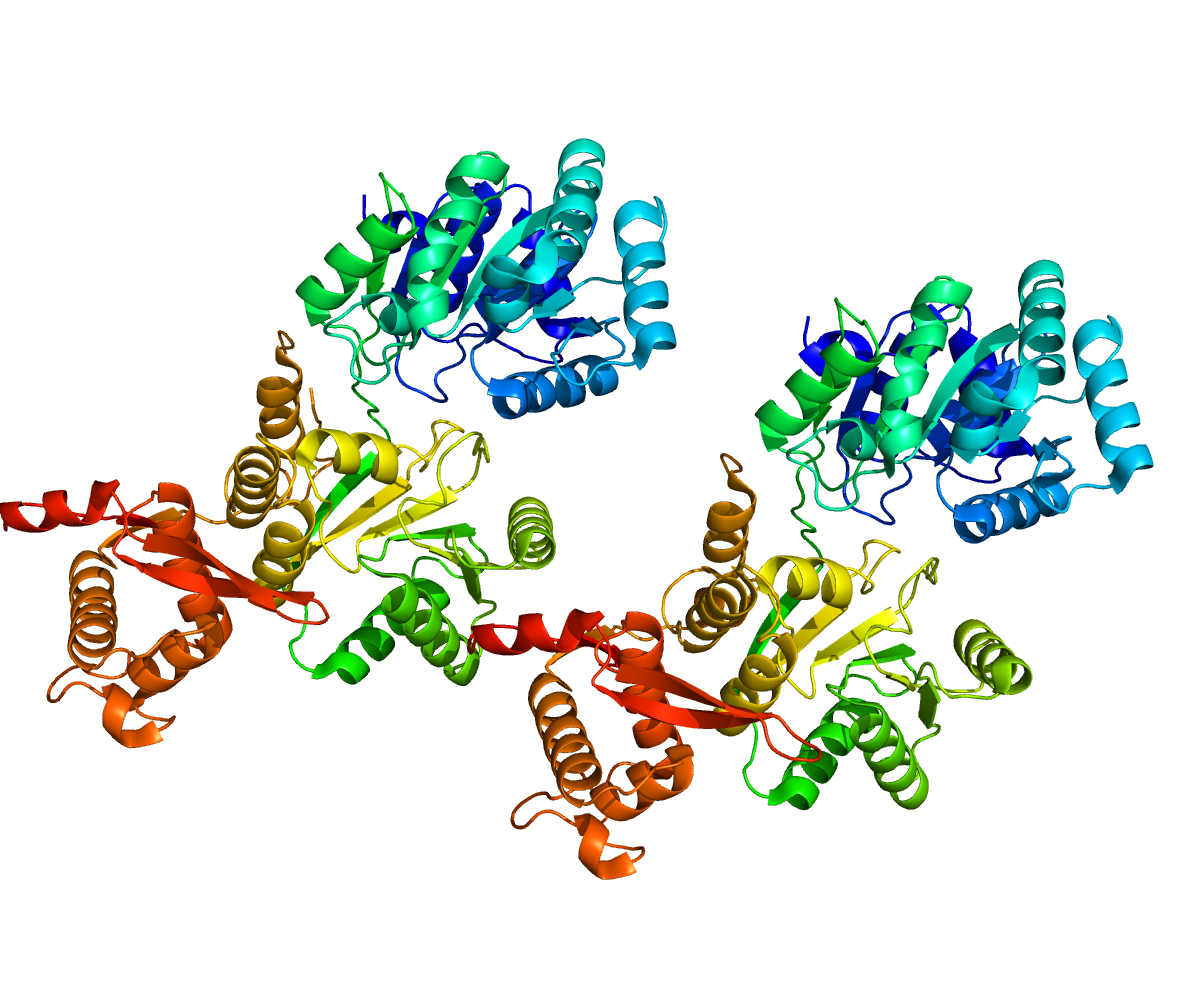

Identifiers
- Aliases: RECQL, RECQL1, RecQ1, RecQ like helicase
- External IDs: OMIM: 600537; MGI: 103021; GeneCards: RECQL
Available structures
PDB	Ortholog search: PDBe RCSB
PDB	List of PDB id codes 2V1X, 2WWY, 4U7D
Enzyme activity
EC #	BRENDA	ExPASy	KEGG	MetaCyc
5.6.2.4	↗	↗	↗	↗

Gene location (Human)
Chr.	Chromosome 12 (human)
Band	12p12.1	Start	21,468,910 bp
Band	12p12.1	End	21,501,669 bp

Gene location (Mouse)
Chr.	Chromosome 6 (mouse)
Band	6 G2|6 73.91 cM	Start	142,296,068 bp
Band	6 G2|6 73.91 cM	End	142,332,813 bp
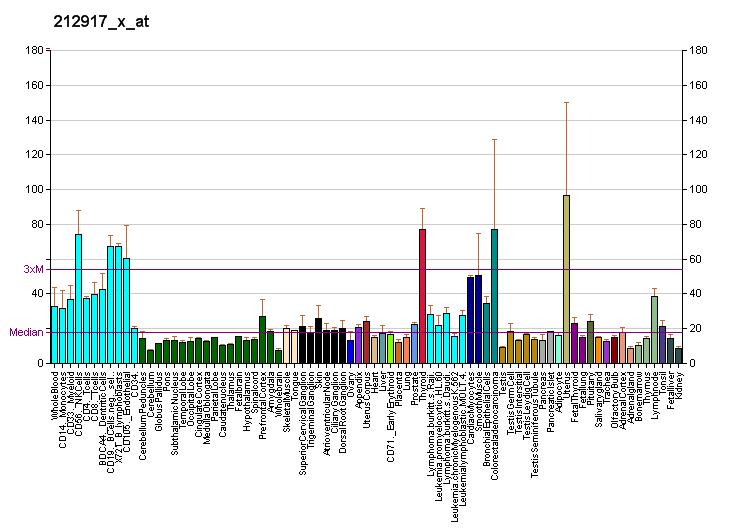

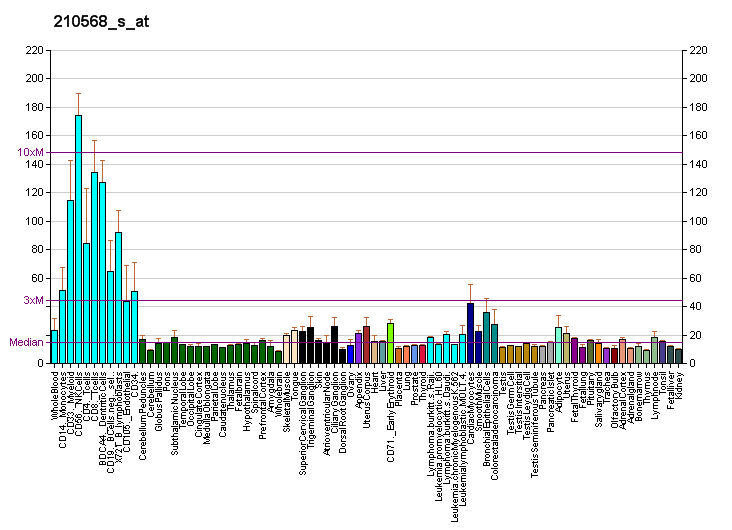

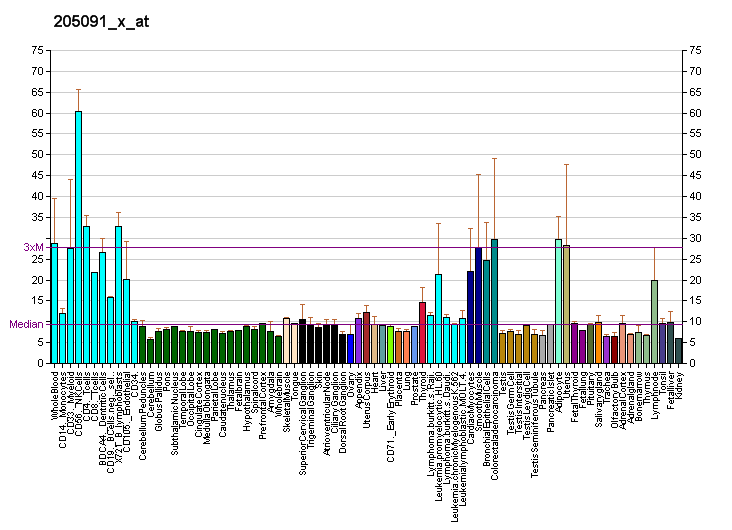
RNA expression pattern
Bgee	Human / Mouse (ortholog); Top expressed in: buccal mucosa cell; tibia; Achilles tendon; parietal pleura; visceral pleura; superficial temporal artery; mucosa of paranasal sinus; synovial joint; oral cavity; skin of hip / Top expressed in: spermatid; spermatocyte; neural layer of retina; Paneth cell; barrel cortex; thymus; otic placode; primitive streak; yolk sac; ventricular zone; More reference expression data
BioGPS	More reference expression data
Gene ontology
Molecular function	ATP-dependent DNA/DNA annealing activity; nucleotide binding; DNA helicase activity; protein binding; hydrolase activity; ATP binding; helicase activity; nucleic acid binding; DNA binding; 3'-5' DNA helicase activity; four-way junction helicase activity
Cellular component	membrane; nucleoplasm; chromosome; cytoplasm; nucleus
Biological process	DNA recombination; DNA repair; double-strand break repair via homologous recombination; DNA duplex unwinding; DNA unwinding involved in DNA replication
Sources:Amigo / QuickGO
Orthologs
Databases	NCBI: entry; OMA: entry
Species	Human	Mouse
Entrez	5965	19691
Ensembl	ENSG00000004700	ENSMUSG00000030243
UniProt	P46063	Q9Z129
RefSeq (mRNA)	NM_002907; NM_032941	NM_001204906; NM_001204907; NM_023042; NM_001355511
RefSeq (protein)	NP_002898; NP_116559	NP_001191835; NP_001191836; NP_075529; NP_001342440
Location (UCSC)	Chr 12: 21.47 – 21.5 Mb	Chr 6: 142.3 – 142.33 Mb
PubMed search
- Wikidata
View/Edit Human	View/Edit Mouse

ATP-dependent DNA helicase Q1 is an enzyme that in humans is encoded by the RECQL gene.

The protein encoded by this gene is a member of the RecQ DNA helicase family. DNA helicases are enzymes involved in various types of DNA repair, including mismatch repair, nucleotide excision repair and direct repair. Some members of this family are associated with genetic disorders with predisposition to malignancy and chromosomal instability. The biological function of this helicase has not yet been determined. Two alternatively spliced transcripts, which encode the same isoform but differ in their 5' and 3' UTRs, have been described.

== Interactions ==
RECQL has been shown to interact with KPNA4 and Karyopherin alpha 2.
