= RVxP motif =

RVxP motif is a protein motif involved in localizing proteins into cilia.

Cilia are sensory organelle of cells, whose malfunction can cause diseases such as polycystic kidney disease, nephronophthisis and Bardet-Biedl syndrome. Proteins employed in the cilia are targeted there when they bear specific entry signals, whereas proteins not situated in cilia are removed or prevented from entering the organelles. Entry signals have been found in ciliary/flagellar proteins of the protozoans Leishmania and Trypanosoma.

The RVxP motif was first described for the PKD2 protein and when inserted in the transferrin receptor it can target it to cilia. It probably carries out its signal function through protein interactions although the exact process and where in the cell it takes place are unknown. Three candidate proteins involved in "receiving" this signal are pericentrin at the basal body of cilia, intraflagellar transport proteins such as IFT57 and ARF4 while the BBSome does not appear to interact with the sequence. The kinesins KIF17 is implicated in transporting the CNGB1 protein which has a RVxP motif into human cilia, as is Rab8a in transporting PKD2. Not all ciliary proteins use a RVxP motif for transport, however; VxPx and Ax(S/A)xQ have also been described as cilium-targeting motifs.

Examples of proteins with RVxP motifs associated with cilia:

- Mouse Ahi1, the homologue of human AHI1, fails to localize to cilia if its RVxP sequence is mutated.
- Caenorhabditis elegans Arl13b requires a RVxP motif to localize to cilia, a property shared by human ARL13B but in the latter case a coiled-coil domain is also needed.
- Human ATP1A4 has a motif similar to RVxP that may play a role in localizing the protein to sperm flagella. This sequence is conserved among species.
- Human CNGB1 features a C-terminal RVxP motif at amino acids 821-824 which if mutated causes the protein to not reach the cilia; other factors however are also needed. This motif is also found in animal CNGB1 homologues.
- Human CRMP2 has a RVxP motif but it does not appear to be required for its ciliar trafficking.
- Human FAM154A has a ciliary localization sequence.
- Tetrahymena GEF1 has a ciliary localization sequence and mutating it causes the protein to no longer localize to cilia.
- Human PDGFRA has a RVxP sequence and may localize to cilia thanks to it.
- Human PKD2 trafficking into cilia has been found in vitro to rely on a N-terminal RVxP motif as PKD2 mutants with alterations in this motif do not appear in cilia. This motif is also found in animal PKD2 homologues but not in Hydra. Mutating this sequence in mice knocked out for PKD1 causes PKD2 to accumulate at the foot of the cilia.

Other proteins associated with cilia for which the occurrence of a RVxP motif has been discussed are PKD1 and PSEN2.
