= Humane Animal Rescue =

Animal welfare organization in Pittsburgh, US

Humane Animal Rescue of Pittsburgh
- Type: Non-Profit
- Founded: 1909 in Pittsburgh, Pennsylvania
- Founder: Elizabeth F. Holmes; M.E. Zydeman; A.M. Wadsworth; R.W. Kenney; Mary Elizabeth Kenney
- Headquarters: 6620 Hamilton Avenue; Pittsburgh, Pennsylvania 15206
- Key people: Ariella Samson, Executive Director
- Website: humaneanimalrescue.org

Humane Animal Rescue of Pittsburgh (HARP), formerly known as the Animal Rescue League of Western Pennsylvania, known commonly as Animal Rescue League Shelter & Wildlife Center (ARL), is an animal welfare organization founded in Pittsburgh, Pennsylvania, in 1909. The ARL is a non-profit organization that offers various services to support both animals and pet owners alike. It is the only animal shelter in the Pittsburgh area that accepts both domestic animals and wildlife. The agency's shelter and clinic are located in Pittsburgh's East Liberty neighborhood, while its wildlife rehabilitation center and boarding kennels are a few miles away in Verona, Pennsylvania. The organization maintains a contract with the city of Pittsburgh and accepts all stray pets that are apprehended by the Animal Control unit.

HARP accepted nearly 10,000 animals in its shelter in 2010 alone. The primary facility in East Liberty celebrated 5,249 adoptions into new homes that year; many more were reclaimed by their owners.

Humane Animal Rescue was formed from the combination of the Animal Rescue League Shelter & Wildlife Center and the Western Pennsylvania Humane Society.

== Mission and open door policy ==
To provide temporary shelter, food, medical attention, and comfort to all abandoned, neglected and injured animals brought to us by the community; to restore lost animals to their owners or seek new homes for them, and educate the public about humane care of animals with a goal of reducing overpopulation.

HARP is an open door shelter. Such a policy means that the organization will accept any animal, regardless of species, age, health, or temperament, every day and does not have a waiting list for admission to its shelter. The shelter has a program to rehabilitate aggressive animals, with the aim of finding homes for them, but is not a no-kill shelter; since most no-kill shelters have a closed door policy.

"Our behavioralists work on certain things like food aggression, getting them to be able to walk on a leash, barking behaviors – things like that", says executive director Dan Rossi.

== History ==
In 1909, five citizens of Pittsburgh, concerned with the well-being of animals in the area, founded the ARL. Their mission was to temporarily house and feed stray animals, to return lost pets with their owners, and seek homes for those left unclaimed. The founders rapidly came to understand the unfortunate reality that not all of the animals in their care could be placed for adoption. Displeased by the cruel euthanasia methods used at the time, the newly formed ARL furthered their mission to provide for a merciful and humane death for old, injured, diseased, or dangerous animals.

Originally incorporated as the Animal Rescue League of Pittsburg, the organization opened its first shelter in May 1910. The shelter was small, but later that year a 16-acre farm called Rosedale was donated to the League. Rosedale's initial use served as overflow housing of dogs and cats that were in the ARL's care. Alleviating some of the space issues, the ARL relocated its quarters to a larger building a few blocks away and contracted a local veterinarian to provide the necessary medical care to the agency's animals.

During its third year in operation, the ARL negotiated a contract with the city of Pittsburgh to provide, "for the arrest, care, and disposal of unlicensed dogs found running at large in the streets." This contract helped to ensure that all stray animals in the city received proper care and treatment. The partnership was also the first of its kind between a local municipality and a voluntary humane organization. For the following 50 years ARL staff members served as the city's "dog catchers."

In midst of World War I, the ARL found itself in a battle with both the city and the US Department of the Interior. Both government agencies mandated that stray cats and dogs be used in trial gas mask development for the war effort. The ARL fiercely opposed this direction until the federal government finally exempted cities with humane societies from the order. Shortly after the end of the war, a pet cemetery was established at the Rosedale campus.

The 1940s brought more changes to the ARL, particularly at Rosedale. A new building was opened at the site for the purpose of boarding owned pets.

Approximately 20 years later, the ARL shelter moved once again to its current facility on Hamilton Avenue. The new building was not only equipped with more kennel space, but also a spay and neuter clinic to alter every adoptable pet. A veterinarian was subsequently hired as a full-time staff member in 1975. The new facilities also brought about a name change for the ARL, now to be known as the Animal Rescue League of Western Pennsylvania.

1997 marked perhaps the largest expansion of the ARL: a wildlife rehabilitation division. The Pennsylvania Wildlife Center was opened at the Rosedale campus allowing the League to provide services to injured wild animals in addition to the domestic animals it already served.

More recently, the ARL expanded its shelter and clinic building in 2000 and opened its Cat Adoption Center on a parcel next to the main shelter in 2010.
