= ARL11 =

Protein-coding gene in the species Homo sapiens

Identifiers
- Aliases: ARL11, ARLTS1, ADP ribosylation factor like GTPase 11
- External IDs: OMIM: 609351; MGI: 2444054; GeneCards: ARL11

Gene location (Human)
Chr.	Chromosome 13 (human)
Band	13q14.2	Start	49,628,507 bp
Band	13q14.2	End	49,633,872 bp

Gene location (Mouse)
Chr.	Chromosome 14 (mouse)
Band	14|14 D1	Start	61,547,202 bp
Band	14|14 D1	End	61,549,385 bp
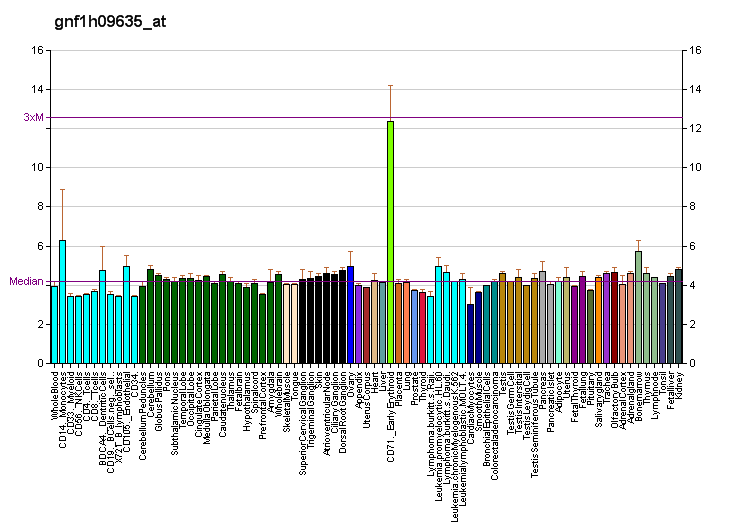
RNA expression pattern
Bgee	Human / Mouse (ortholog); Top expressed in: monocyte; blood; trabecular bone; granulocyte; bone marrow; thymus; lymph node; spleen; appendix; bone marrow cell / Top expressed in: granulocyte; spermatid; bone marrow; testicle; right lobe of liver; pharynx; appendicular skeleton; neck; lung; embryo; More reference expression data
BioGPS	More reference expression data
Gene ontology
Molecular function	nucleotide binding; GTP binding; protein binding
Cellular component	intracellular anatomical structure; cytoplasm; plasma membrane
Biological process	hematopoietic progenitor cell differentiation; intracellular protein transport; vesicle-mediated transport
Sources:Amigo / QuickGO
Orthologs
Databases	NCBI: entry; OMA: entry
Species	Human	Mouse
Entrez	115761	219144
Ensembl	ENSG00000152213	ENSMUSG00000043157
UniProt	Q969Q4	Q6P3A9
RefSeq (mRNA)	NM_138450	NM_177337
RefSeq (protein)	NP_612459	NP_796311
Location (UCSC)	Chr 13: 49.63 – 49.63 Mb	Chr 14: 61.55 – 61.55 Mb
PubMed search
- Wikidata
View/Edit Human	View/Edit Mouse

ADP-ribosylation factor-like protein 11 is a protein that in humans is encoded by the ARL11 gene.
