= ARL15 =

Protein-coding gene in the species Homo sapiens

Identifiers
- Aliases: ARL15, ARFRP2, ADP ribosylation factor like GTPase 15
- External IDs: MGI: 2442308; GeneCards: ARL15

Gene location (Human)
Chr.	Chromosome 5 (human)
Band	5q11.2	Start	53,883,942 bp
Band	5q11.2	End	54,310,582 bp

Gene location (Mouse)
Chr.	Chromosome 13 (mouse)
Band	13|13 D2.2	Start	113,931,041 bp
Band	13|13 D2.2	End	114,293,997 bp
RNA expression pattern
Bgee	Human / Mouse (ortholog); Top expressed in: endothelial cell; renal medulla; visceral pleura; vena cava; Brodmann area 23; Achilles tendon; skin of hip; skin of thigh; parietal pleura; gingival epithelium / Top expressed in: hand; zygote; trigeminal ganglion; secondary oocyte; foot; left lung lobe; hippocampus proper; vestibular labyrinth; subdivision of hippocampus; stria vascularis; More reference expression data
BioGPS	n/a
Gene ontology
Molecular function	nucleotide binding; GTP binding; molecular function
Cellular component	extracellular exosome; intracellular anatomical structure
Biological process	small GTPase mediated signal transduction; biological process
Sources:Amigo / QuickGO
Orthologs
Databases	NCBI: entry; OMA: entry
Species	Human	Mouse
Entrez	54622	218639
Ensembl	ENSG00000185305	ENSMUSG00000042348
UniProt	Q9NXU5	Q8BGR6
RefSeq (mRNA)	NM_019087	NM_172595
RefSeq (protein)	NP_061960	NP_766183
Location (UCSC)	Chr 5: 53.88 – 54.31 Mb	Chr 13: 113.93 – 114.29 Mb
PubMed search
- Wikidata
View/Edit Human	View/Edit Mouse

ADP-ribosylation factor-like 15 is a protein in humans that is encoded by the ARL15 gene.
