= ARL13A =

Protein-coding gene in humans

Identifiers
- Aliases: ARL13A, ARL13, dJ341D10.2, ADP ribosylation factor like GTPase 13A
- External IDs: MGI: 1921698; GeneCards: ARL13A

Gene location (Human)
| Chr. | X chromosome (human) |
| Band | Xq22.1 | Start | 100,969,708 bp |
| Band | Xq22.1 | End | 100,990,831 bp |

Gene location (Mouse)
| Chr. | X chromosome (mouse) |
| Band | X|X E3 | Start | 133,088,250 bp |
| Band | X|X E3 | End | 133,108,777 bp |
RNA expression pattern
| Bgee | Human / Mouse (ortholog); Top expressed in: gonad; testicle; left testis; right testis; gastric mucosa; Achilles tendon; right coronary artery; endometrium; granulocyte; monocyte / Top expressed in: spermatid; seminiferous tubule; embryo; blastocyst; embryo; spermatocyte; neural layer of retina; genital tubercle; More reference expression data |
| BioGPS | n/a |
Gene ontology
| Molecular function | GTP binding; nucleotide binding |
| Cellular component | intracellular anatomical structure; cilium; ciliary membrane; non-motile cilium |
| Biological process | small GTPase mediated signal transduction; receptor localization to non-motile cilium; non-motile cilium assembly |
Sources:Amigo / QuickGO
Orthologs
| Databases | NCBI: entry; OMA: entry |
| Species | Human | Mouse |
| Entrez | 392509 | 74448 |
| Ensembl | ENSG00000174225 | ENSMUSG00000052549 |
| UniProt | Q5H913 | Q9D416 |
| RefSeq (mRNA) | NM_001162491 | NM_028947 |
| RefSeq (protein) | NP_001155963 | NP_083223 |
| Location (UCSC) | Chr X: 100.97 – 100.99 Mb | Chr X: 133.09 – 133.11 Mb |
| PubMed search |
- Wikidata
| View/Edit Human | View/Edit Mouse |

ADP ribosylation factor like GTPase 13A is a protein that in humans is encoded by the ARL13A gene.
