= ARL8B =

Protein-coding gene in the species Homo sapiens

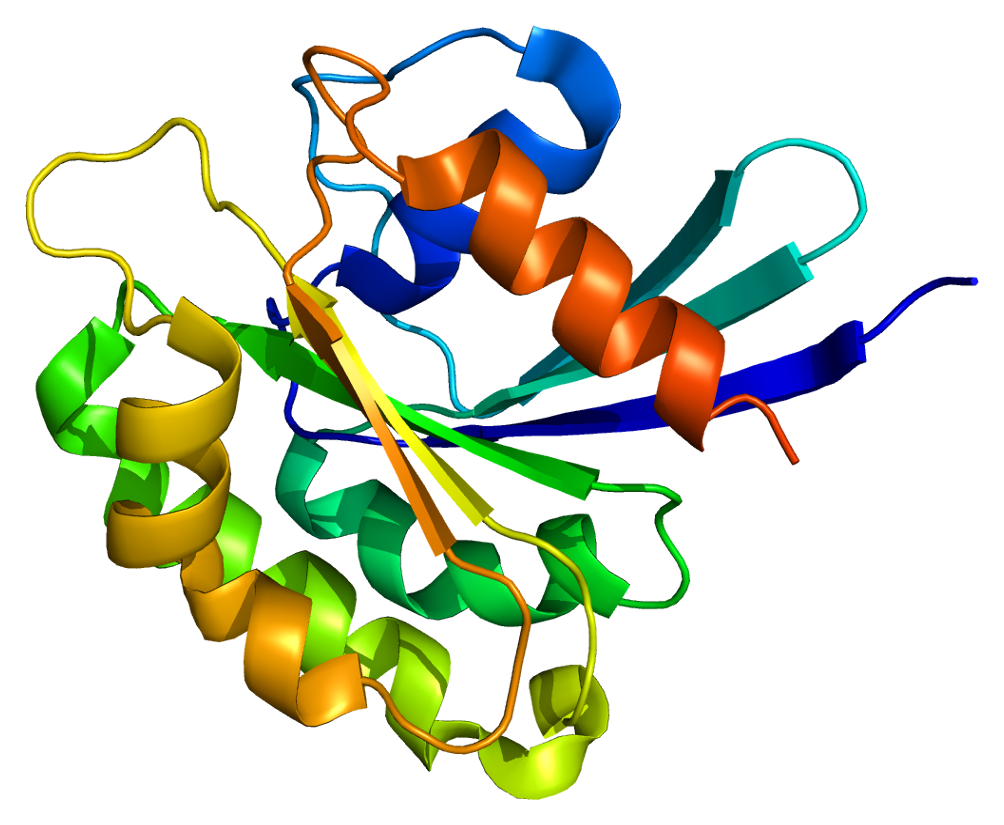

Identifiers
- Aliases: ARL8B, ARL10C, Gie1, ADP ribosylation factor like GTPase 8B
- External IDs: OMIM: 616596; MGI: 1914416; GeneCards: ARL8B
Available structures
PDB	Ortholog search: PDBe RCSB
PDB	List of PDB id codes 2AL7
Enzyme activity
EC #	BRENDA	ExPASy	KEGG	MetaCyc
3.6.5.2	↗	↗	↗	↗

Gene location (Human)
Chr.	Chromosome 3 (human)
Band	3p26.1	Start	5,122,249 bp
Band	3p26.1	End	5,180,911 bp

Gene location (Mouse)
Chr.	Chromosome 6 (mouse)
Band	6|6 E2	Start	108,760,060 bp
Band	6|6 E2	End	108,802,239 bp
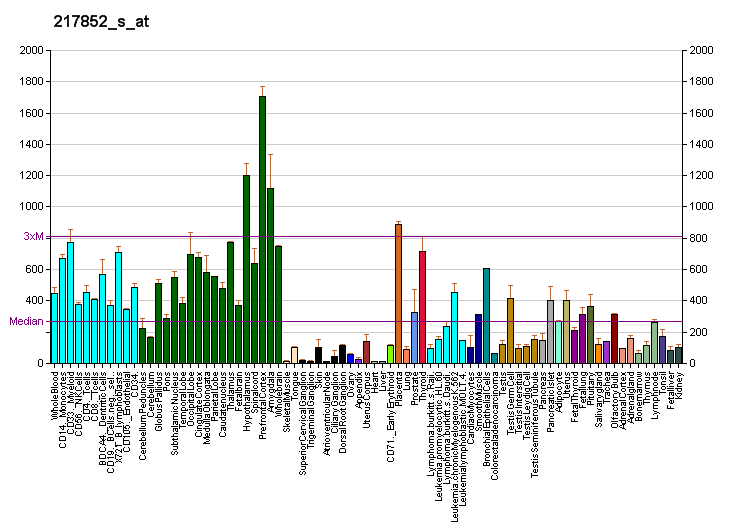
RNA expression pattern
Bgee	Human / Mouse (ortholog); Top expressed in: middle temporal gyrus; Brodmann area 23; lateral nuclear group of thalamus; postcentral gyrus; amniotic fluid; Brodmann area 46; pons; orbitofrontal cortex; gingival epithelium; entorhinal cortex / Top expressed in: dentate gyrus of hippocampal formation granule cell; superior frontal gyrus; muscle of thigh; subiculum; tail of embryo; anterior amygdaloid area; olfactory tubercle; ventral tegmental area; dorsomedial hypothalamic nucleus; prefrontal cortex; More reference expression data
BioGPS	More reference expression data
Gene ontology
Molecular function	nucleotide binding; GDP binding; alpha-tubulin binding; GTP binding; GTPase activity; beta-tubulin binding; protein binding
Cellular component	cytoplasm; endosome; membrane; late endosome membrane; spindle; intracellular anatomical structure; midbody; spindle midzone; lysosome; extracellular exosome; cytoskeleton; lysosomal membrane; vacuolar membrane; axon; synapse; axon cytoplasm; cell junction; cell projection
Biological process	chromosome segregation; small GTPase mediated signal transduction; cell division; cell cycle; lysosome localization; anterograde axonal transport; protein transport
Sources:Amigo / QuickGO
Orthologs
Databases	NCBI: entry; OMA: entry
Species	Human	Mouse
Entrez	55207	67166
Ensembl	ENSG00000134108	ENSMUSG00000030105
UniProt	Q9NVJ2	Q9CQW2
RefSeq (mRNA)	NM_018184	NM_026011
RefSeq (protein)	NP_060654	NP_080287
Location (UCSC)	Chr 3: 5.12 – 5.18 Mb	Chr 6: 108.76 – 108.8 Mb
PubMed search
- Wikidata
View/Edit Human	View/Edit Mouse

ADP-ribosylation factor-like protein 8B is a protein that in humans is encoded by the ARL8B gene.
