= ARL8A =

Protein-coding gene in humans

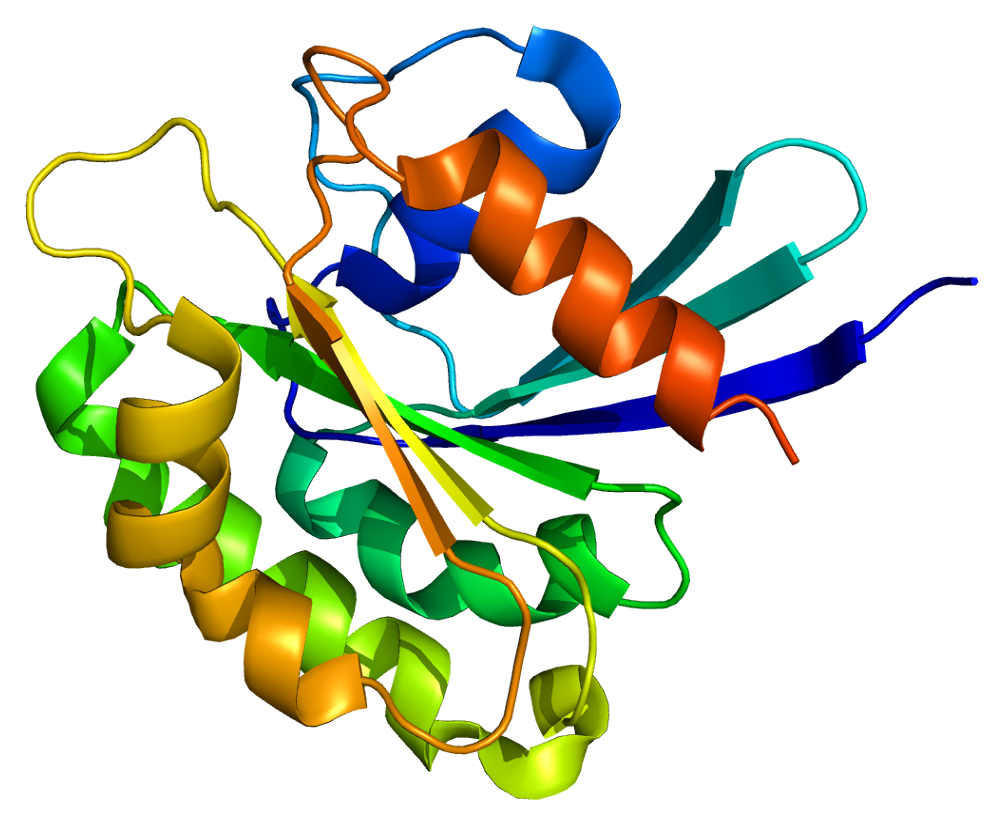

Identifiers
- Aliases: ARL8A, ARL10B, GIE2, ADP ribosylation factor like GTPase 8A
- External IDs: OMIM: 616597; MGI: 1915974; GeneCards: ARL8A
Available structures
PDB	Ortholog search: PDBe RCSB
PDB	List of PDB id codes 1ZD9, 2H18, 4ILE

Gene location (Human)
Chr.	Chromosome 1 (human)
Band	1q32.1	Start	202,133,404 bp
Band	1q32.1	End	202,144,743 bp

Gene location (Mouse)
Chr.	Chromosome 1 (mouse)
Band	1|1 E4	Start	135,074,562 bp
Band	1|1 E4	End	135,084,007 bp
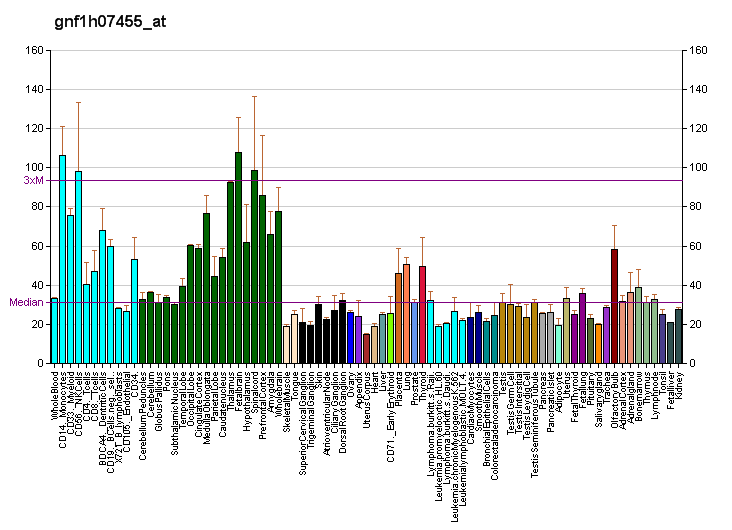
RNA expression pattern
Bgee	Human / Mouse (ortholog); Top expressed in: C1 segment; Brodmann area 9; hypothalamus; ganglionic eminence; substantia nigra; cingulate gyrus; anterior cingulate cortex; inferior ganglion of vagus nerve; putamen; amygdala / Top expressed in: primary visual cortex; superior frontal gyrus; dentate gyrus of hippocampal formation granule cell; granulocyte; dorsomedial hypothalamic nucleus; cerebellar cortex; neural layer of retina; piriform cortex; habenula; subiculum; More reference expression data
BioGPS	More reference expression data
Gene ontology
Molecular function	nucleotide binding; alpha-tubulin binding; GTP binding; protein binding; beta-tubulin binding; GTPase activity
Cellular component	cytoplasm; spindle midzone; lysosomal membrane; endosome; lysosome; midbody; extracellular exosome; intracellular anatomical structure; membrane; late endosome membrane; plasma membrane; azurophil granule membrane; ficolin-1-rich granule membrane; vacuolar membrane; axon cytoplasm; spindle; cytoskeleton; cell junction; axon; cell projection; synapse
Biological process	cell division; small GTPase mediated signal transduction; cell cycle; chromosome segregation; neutrophil degranulation; anterograde axonal transport; protein transport
Sources:Amigo / QuickGO
Orthologs
Databases	NCBI: entry; OMA: entry
Species	Human	Mouse
Entrez	127829	68724
Ensembl	ENSG00000143862	ENSMUSG00000026426
UniProt	Q96BM9	Q8VEH3
RefSeq (mRNA)	NM_138795; NM_001256129	NM_026823
RefSeq (protein)	NP_001243058; NP_620150	NP_081099
Location (UCSC)	Chr 1: 202.13 – 202.14 Mb	Chr 1: 135.07 – 135.08 Mb
PubMed search
- Wikidata
View/Edit Human	View/Edit Mouse

ADP-ribosylation factor-like protein 8A is a protein that in humans is encoded by the ARL8A gene.
