= ARL3 =

Protein-coding gene in the species Homo sapiens

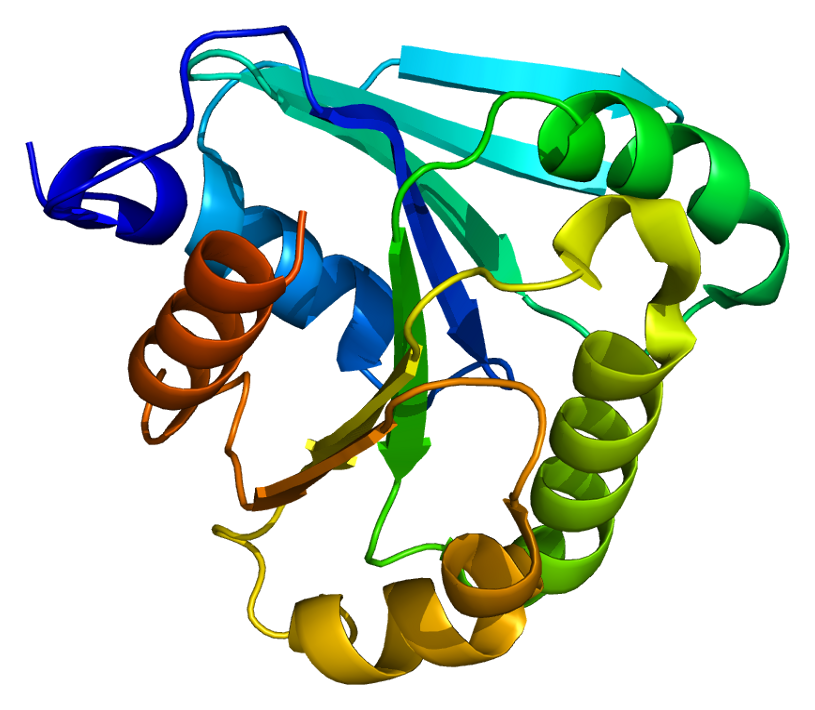

Identifiers
- Aliases: ARL3, ARFL3, ADP ribosylation factor like GTPase 3, JBTS35, RP83
- External IDs: OMIM: 604695; MGI: 1929699; GeneCards: ARL3
Available structures
PDB	Ortholog search: PDBe RCSB
PDB	List of PDB id codes 1FZQ, 3BH6, 3BH7, 4GOJ

Gene location (Human)
Chr.	Chromosome 10 (human)
Band	10q24.32	Start	102,673,731 bp
Band	10q24.32	End	102,714,397 bp

Gene location (Mouse)
Chr.	Chromosome 19 (mouse)
Band	19|19 C3	Start	46,519,535 bp
Band	19|19 C3	End	46,561,637 bp
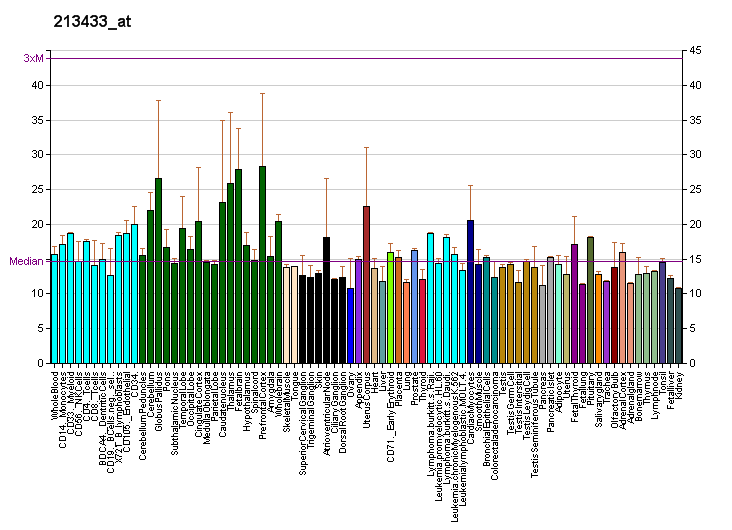

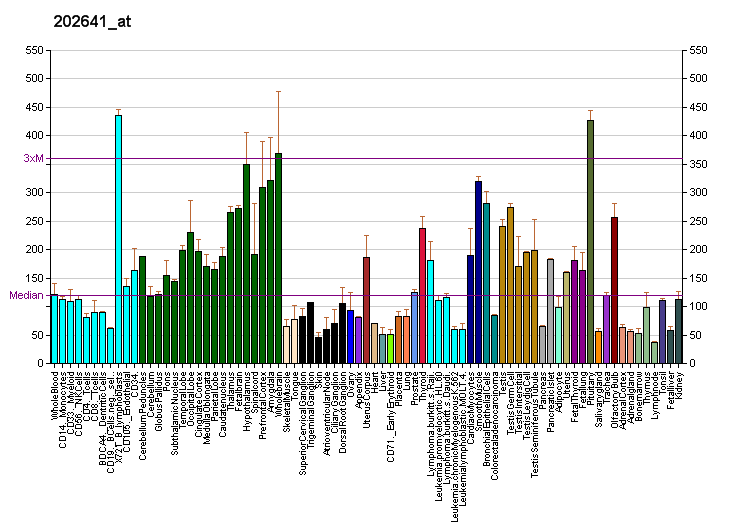
RNA expression pattern
Bgee	Human / Mouse (ortholog); Top expressed in: bronchial epithelial cell; mucosa of paranasal sinus; palpebral conjunctiva; retinal pigment epithelium; pons; pars compacta; pars reticulata; tibia; epithelium of nasopharynx; external globus pallidus / Top expressed in: neural layer of retina; Epithelium of choroid plexus; epithelium of lens; retinal pigment epithelium; motor neuron; medullary collecting duct; fossa; substantia nigra; Rostral migratory stream; olfactory epithelium; More reference expression data
BioGPS	More reference expression data
Gene ontology
Molecular function	nucleotide binding; GDP binding; microtubule binding; GTP binding; metal ion binding; protein binding; GTPase activity; magnesium ion binding; GTPase activating protein binding
Cellular component	cytoplasm; centrosome; Golgi apparatus; cell projection; membrane; Golgi membrane; spindle; intracellular anatomical structure; photoreceptor connecting cilium; microtubule organizing center; midbody; spindle microtubule; cytoplasmic microtubule; extracellular exosome; cytoskeleton; nucleus; cilium; microtubule cytoskeleton
Biological process	cilium assembly; kidney development; intraciliary transport; small GTPase mediated signal transduction; photoreceptor cell development; post-Golgi vesicle-mediated transport; cell division; protein transport; cell cycle; smoothened signaling pathway; transport; mitotic cytokinesis; Golgi to plasma membrane transport; protein localization to cilium; protein localization to ciliary membrane
Sources:Amigo / QuickGO
Orthologs
Databases	NCBI: entry; OMA: entry
Species	Human	Mouse
Entrez	403	56350
Ensembl	ENSG00000138175	ENSMUSG00000025035
UniProt	P36405	Q9WUL7
RefSeq (mRNA)	NM_004311	NM_019718; NM_001355233
RefSeq (protein)	NP_004302	NP_062692; NP_001342162
Location (UCSC)	Chr 10: 102.67 – 102.71 Mb	Chr 19: 46.52 – 46.56 Mb
PubMed search
- Wikidata
View/Edit Human	View/Edit Mouse

ADP-ribosylation factor-like protein 3 is a protein that in humans is encoded by the ARL3 gene.

== Function ==
ADP-ribosylation factor-like 3 is a member of the ADP-ribosylation factor family of GTP-binding proteins. ARL3 binds guanine nucleotides but lacks ADP-ribosylation factor activity.

== Interactions ==
ARL3 has been shown to interact with Protein unc-119 homolog.
