= ARL4A =

Protein-coding gene in the species Homo sapiens

Identifiers
- Aliases: ARL4A, ARL4, ADP ribosylation factor like GTPase 4A
- External IDs: OMIM: 604786; MGI: 99437; GeneCards: ARL4A

Gene location (Human)
Chr.	Chromosome 7 (human)
Band	7p21.3	Start	12,686,856 bp
Band	7p21.3	End	12,690,958 bp

Gene location (Mouse)
Chr.	Chromosome 12 (mouse)
Band	12 B1|12 18.06 cM	Start	40,055,446 bp
Band	12 B1|12 18.06 cM	End	40,088,024 bp
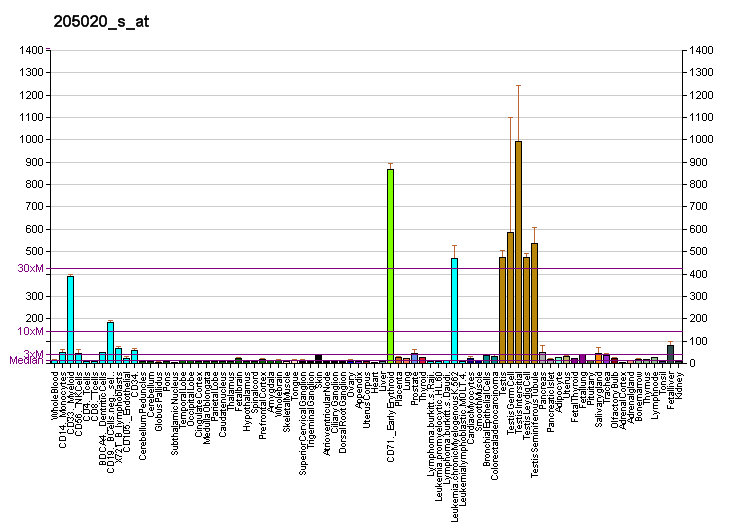
RNA expression pattern
Bgee	Human / Mouse (ortholog); Top expressed in: left testis; right testis; skin of abdomen; olfactory zone of nasal mucosa; mucosa of transverse colon; skin of leg; vagina; Achilles tendon; rectum; bone marrow / Top expressed in: seminiferous tubule; spermatid; spermatocyte; decidua; ascending aorta; brown adipose tissue; gastrula; skin of external ear; white adipose tissue; intercostal muscle; More reference expression data
BioGPS	More reference expression data
Gene ontology
Molecular function	nucleotide binding; GTP binding; protein binding
Cellular component	plasma membrane; nucleolus; intracellular anatomical structure; membrane; nucleus; nucleoplasm; cytoplasm; cytosol
Biological process	brown fat cell differentiation; intracellular protein transport; vesicle-mediated transport
Sources:Amigo / QuickGO
Orthologs
Databases	NCBI: entry; OMA: entry
Species	Human	Mouse
Entrez	10124	11861
Ensembl	ENSG00000122644	ENSMUSG00000047446
UniProt	P40617	P61213
RefSeq (mRNA)	NM_212460; NM_001037164; NM_001195396; NM_005738	NM_001039515; NM_007487
RefSeq (protein)	NP_001032241; NP_001182325; NP_005729; NP_997625	NP_001034604; NP_031513
Location (UCSC)	Chr 7: 12.69 – 12.69 Mb	Chr 12: 40.06 – 40.09 Mb
PubMed search
- Wikidata
View/Edit Human	View/Edit Mouse

ADP-ribosylation factor-like protein 4A is a protein that in humans is encoded by the ARL4A gene.

== Function ==
ADP-ribosylation factor-like 4A is a member of the ADP-ribosylation factor family of GTP-binding proteins. ARL4A is similar to ARL4C and ARL4D and each has a nuclear localization signal and an unusually high guanine nucleotide exchange rate. ARL4A is located in both the nuclear and extranuclear cell compartments. Multiple transcript variants encoding the same protein have been found for this gene.

== Interactions ==
ARL4A has been shown to interact with Karyopherin alpha 2.
