= ARF3 =

Protein-coding gene in the species Homo sapiens

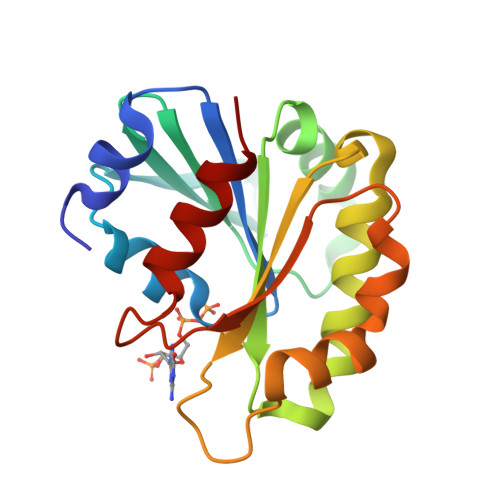

Identifiers
- Aliases: ARF3, ADP ribosylation factor 3
- External IDs: OMIM: 103190; MGI: 99432; GeneCards: ARF3

Gene location (Human)
| Chr. | Chromosome 12 (human) |
| Band | 12q13.12 | Start | 48,935,723 bp |
| Band | 12q13.12 | End | 48,957,487 bp |

Gene location (Mouse)
| Chr. | Chromosome 15 (mouse) |
| Band | 15|15 F1 | Start | 98,634,515 bp |
| Band | 15|15 F1 | End | 98,661,095 bp |
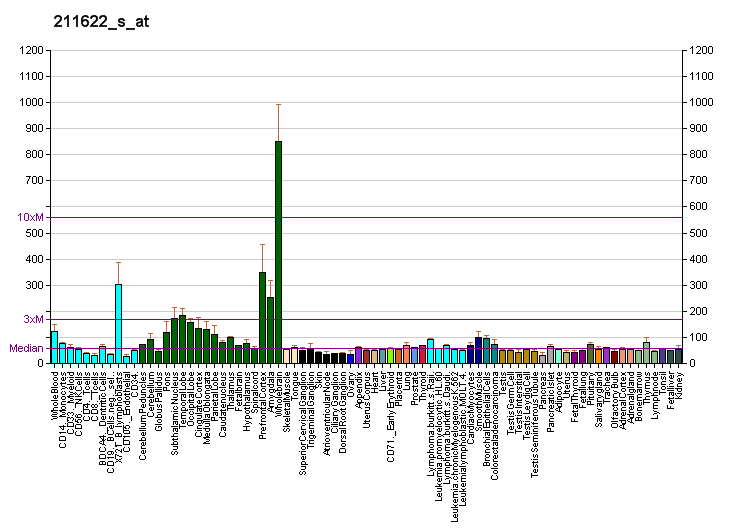

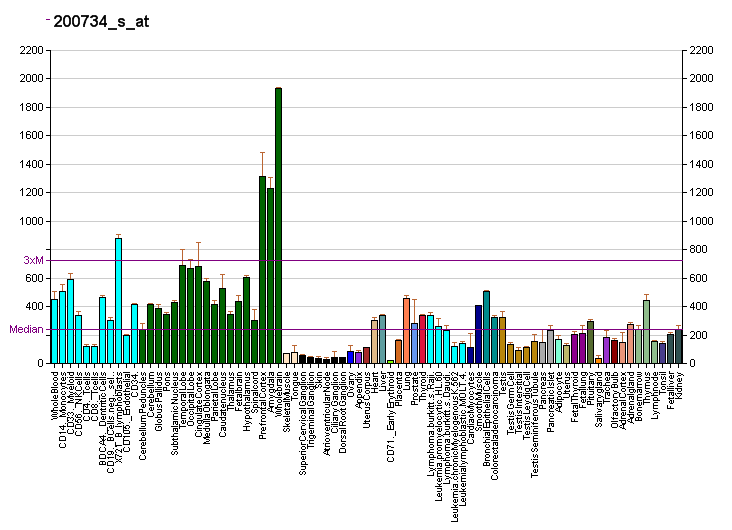

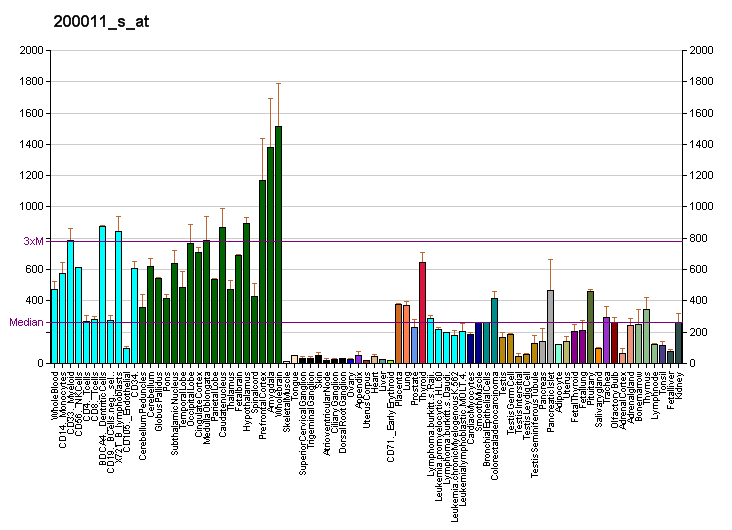
RNA expression pattern
| Bgee | Human / Mouse (ortholog); Top expressed in: prefrontal cortex; entorhinal cortex; postcentral gyrus; Brodmann area 10; superior frontal gyrus; Brodmann area 46; Region I of hippocampus proper; frontal pole; nucleus accumbens; dorsolateral prefrontal cortex / Top expressed in: nucleus accumbens; dorsal striatum; dentate gyrus of hippocampal formation granule cell; olfactory tubercle; prefrontal cortex; superior frontal gyrus; lateral septal nucleus; anterior amygdaloid area; piriform cortex; Region I of hippocampus proper; More reference expression data |
| BioGPS | More reference expression data |
Gene ontology
| Molecular function | nucleotide binding; GTP binding; GTPase activity |
| Cellular component | cytoplasm; perinuclear region of cytoplasm; Golgi membrane; Golgi apparatus; extracellular exosome; intracellular anatomical structure; plasma membrane |
| Biological process | protein transport; phosphatidylinositol biosynthetic process; small GTPase mediated signal transduction; vesicle-mediated transport; retrograde vesicle-mediated transport, Golgi to endoplasmic reticulum; transport; intracellular protein transport; Golgi to plasma membrane transport |
Sources:Amigo / QuickGO
Orthologs
| Databases | NCBI: entry; OMA: entry |
| Species | Human | Mouse |
| Entrez | 377 | 11842 |
| Ensembl | ENSG00000134287 | ENSMUSG00000051853 |
| UniProt | P61204 | P61205 |
| RefSeq (mRNA) | NM_001659 | NM_007478; NM_001355510 |
| RefSeq (protein) | NP_001650 | NP_031504; NP_001342439 |
| Location (UCSC) | Chr 12: 48.94 – 48.96 Mb | Chr 15: 98.63 – 98.66 Mb |
| PubMed search |
- Wikidata
| View/Edit Human | View/Edit Mouse |

ADP-ribosylation factor 3 is a protein that in humans is encoded by the ARF3 gene.

== Function ==
ADP-ribosylation factor 3 (ARF3) is a member of the human ARF gene family. These genes encode small guanine nucleotide-binding proteins that stimulate the ADP-ribosyltransferase activity of cholera toxin and play a role in vesicular trafficking and as activators of phospholipase D. The gene products include 6 ARF proteins and 11 ARF-like proteins and constitute 1 family of the RAS superfamily. The ARF proteins are categorized as class I (ARF1, ARF2, and ARF3), class II (ARF4 and ARF5) and class III (ARF6) and members of each class share a common gene organization. The ARF3 gene contains five exons and four introns.

== Interactions ==
ARF3 has been shown to interact with:

- ARFIP1,
- ARFIP2,
- GGA1,
- GGA3, and
- KIF23.
