= ARF6 =

Protein-coding gene in the species Homo sapiens

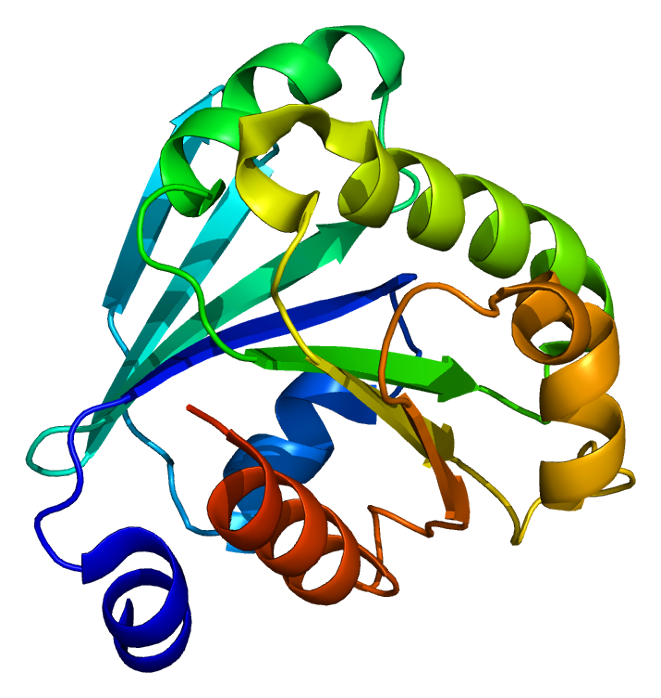

Identifiers
- Aliases: ARF6, ADP-ribosylation factor 6, ADP ribosylation factor 6
- External IDs: OMIM: 600464; MGI: 99435; GeneCards: ARF6
Available structures
PDB	Ortholog search: PDBe RCSB
PDB	List of PDB id codes 1E0S, 2A5D, 2A5F, 2A5G, 2BAO, 2BAU, 2J5X, 2W83, 3LVQ, 3LVR, 4FME, 3N5C, 3PCR, 4KAX
Enzyme activity
EC #	BRENDA	ExPASy	KEGG	MetaCyc
3.6.5.2	↗	↗	↗	↗

Gene location (Human)
Chr.	Chromosome 14 (human)
Band	14q21.3	Start	49,893,079 bp
Band	14q21.3	End	49,897,054 bp

Gene location (Mouse)
Chr.	Chromosome 12 (mouse)
Band	12|12 C2	Start	69,418,924 bp
Band	12|12 C2	End	69,420,557 bp
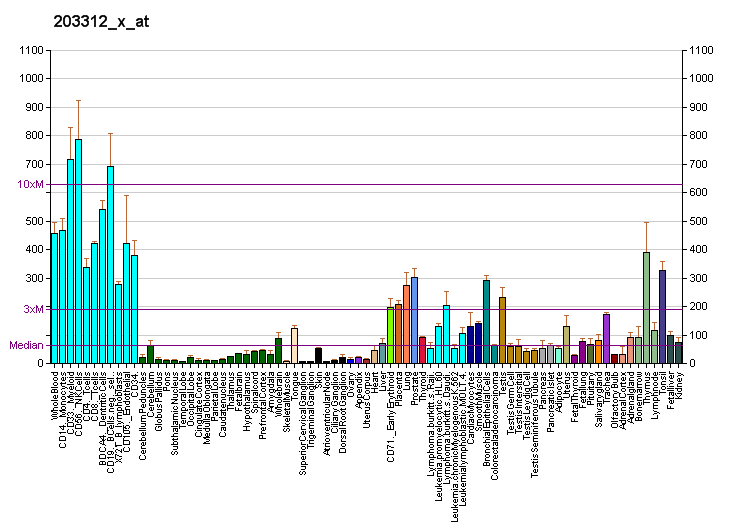

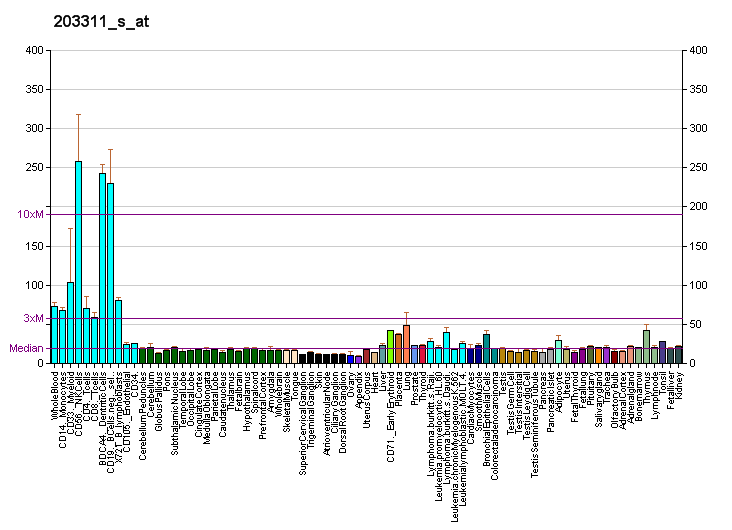
RNA expression pattern
Bgee	Human / Mouse (ortholog); Top expressed in: gingival epithelium; oral cavity; amniotic fluid; buccal mucosa cell; human penis; vulva; germinal epithelium; trabecular bone; mucosa of sigmoid colon; parietal pleura / Top expressed in: conjunctival fornix; cumulus cell; hair follicle; Paneth cell; condyle; endocardial cushion; endothelial cell of lymphatic vessel; seminal vesicula; semi-lunar valve; motor neuron; More reference expression data
BioGPS	More reference expression data
Gene ontology
Molecular function	nucleotide binding; protein N-terminus binding; GTP binding; protein binding; GTPase activity; thioesterase binding
Cellular component	cytoplasm; recycling endosome; endosome; Golgi apparatus; cell projection; membrane; focal adhesion; ruffle; myelin sheath; plasma membrane; endocytic vesicle; intracellular anatomical structure; cell cortex; early endosome; endosome membrane; extracellular exosome; filopodium membrane; recycling endosome membrane; cleavage furrow; cytosol; Flemming body; early endosome membrane; presynapse; glutamatergic synapse
Biological process	establishment of epithelial cell polarity; cell differentiation; regulation of filopodium assembly; positive regulation of actin filament polymerization; ruffle organization; small GTPase mediated signal transduction; regulation of Rac protein signal transduction; nervous system development; negative regulation of dendrite development; cell division; negative regulation of receptor-mediated endocytosis; cell adhesion; protein localization to cell surface; protein transport; protein localization to endosome; cell cycle; liver development; myeloid cell apoptotic process; cortical actin cytoskeleton organization; vesicle-mediated transport; regulation of dendritic spine development; hepatocyte apoptotic process; transport; positive regulation of protein localization to plasma membrane; intracellular protein transport; regulation of neuron projection development; endocytic recycling; synaptic vesicle endocytosis; positive regulation of keratinocyte migration; ruffle assembly; maintenance of postsynaptic density structure; positive regulation of adherens junction organization; regulation of presynapse assembly; cellular response to nerve growth factor stimulus; negative regulation of protein localization to cell surface; positive regulation of protein secretion; positive regulation of protein homodimerization activity
Sources:Amigo / QuickGO
Orthologs
Databases	NCBI: entry; OMA: entry
Species	Human	Mouse
Entrez	382	11845
Ensembl	ENSG00000165527	ENSMUSG00000044147
UniProt	P62330	P62331
RefSeq (mRNA)	NM_001663	NM_007481
RefSeq (protein)	NP_001654	NP_031507
Location (UCSC)	Chr 14: 49.89 – 49.9 Mb	Chr 12: 69.42 – 69.42 Mb
PubMed search
- Wikidata
View/Edit Human	View/Edit Mouse

ADP-ribosylation factor 6 (ARF6) is a member of the ADP ribosylation factor family of GTP-binding proteins. ARF6 has a variety of cellular functions that are frequently involved in trafficking of biological membranes and transmembrane protein cargo. ARF6 has specifically been implicated in endocytosis of plasma membrane proteins and also, to a lesser extent, plasma membrane protein recycling.

== Function ==
This gene encodes a member of the human ARF gene family, which is part of the Ras superfamily. The ARF genes encode small guanine nucleotide-binding proteins that stimulate the ADP-ribosyltransferase activity of cholera toxin and play a role in vesicular trafficking and as activators of phospholipase D. The product of this gene is localized to the plasma membrane, and regulates vesicular trafficking, remodelling of membrane lipids, and signaling pathways that lead to actin remodeling. A pseudogene of this gene is located on chromosome 7.

ARF6 can interact with βarrestin upon receptor activation.

== Interactions ==
ARF6 has been shown to interact with:

- ARRB1
- ARFIP2
- CHRM3
- EXOC5
- KIAA0090
- Rac1
