= ARF1 =

Protein-coding gene in humans

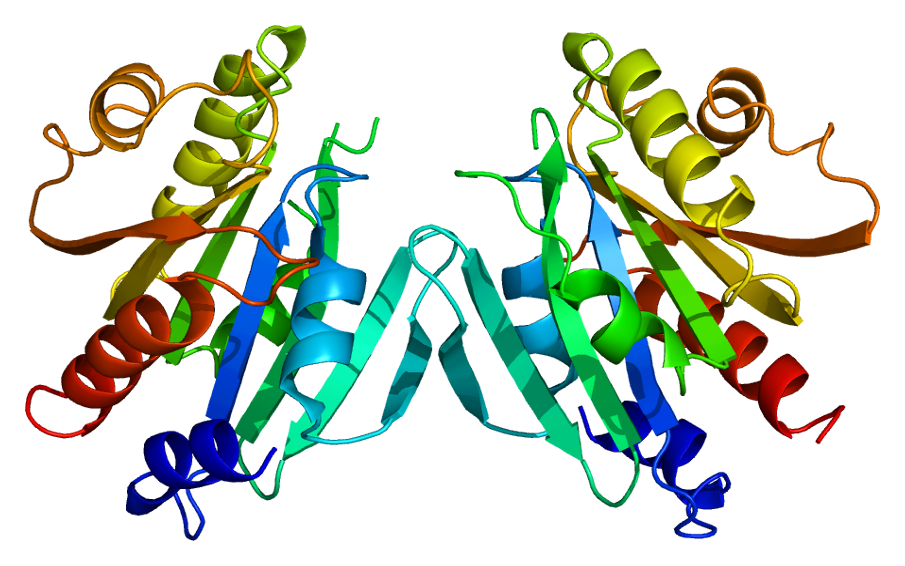

Identifiers
- Aliases: ARF1, ADP ribosylation factor 1, PVNH8
- External IDs: OMIM: 103180; MGI: 99431; GeneCards: ARF1
Available structures
PDB	Ortholog search: PDBe RCSB
PDB	List of PDB id codes 1HUR, 1RE0, 1U81, 3O47, 4HMY, 1R8Q, 1RRG, 1RRF
Enzyme activity
EC #	BRENDA	ExPASy	KEGG	MetaCyc
3.6.5.2	↗	↗	↗	↗

Gene location (Human)
Chr.	Chromosome 1 (human)
Band	1q42.13	Start	228,082,660 bp
Band	1q42.13	End	228,099,212 bp

Gene location (Mouse)
Chr.	Chromosome 11 (mouse)
Band	11|11 B1.3	Start	59,102,238 bp
Band	11|11 B1.3	End	59,119,096 bp
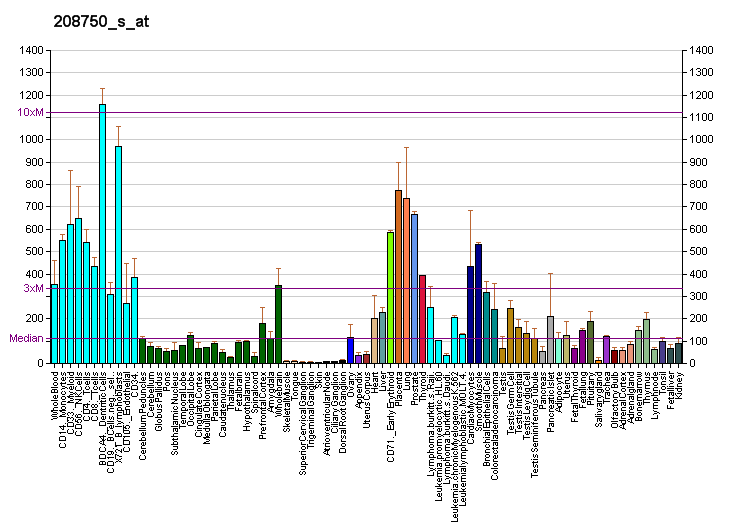
RNA expression pattern
Bgee	Human / Mouse (ortholog); Top expressed in: mucosa of ileum; stromal cell of endometrium; cardiac muscle tissue of right atrium; beta cell; pituitary gland; anterior pituitary; corpus epididymis; right lung; upper lobe of lung; upper lobe of left lung / Top expressed in: zygote; dentate gyrus of hippocampal formation granule cell; yolk sac; ankle joint; tail of embryo; right kidney; primary visual cortex; granulocyte; superior frontal gyrus; lip; More reference expression data
BioGPS	More reference expression data
Gene ontology
Molecular function	phospholipase D activator activity; nucleotide binding; GTP binding; magnesium ion binding; GTPase activity; GDP binding; protein binding; RNA binding; protein domain specific binding; protein heterodimerization activity
Cellular component	extracellular exosome; late endosome; cytoplasm; synapse; trans-Golgi network; Golgi apparatus; cell junction; endomembrane system; peroxisomal membrane; cell leading edge; neuron projection; postsynaptic density; postsynaptic membrane; membrane; focal adhesion; intracellular anatomical structure; perinuclear region of cytoplasm; sarcomere; COPI-coated vesicle; cytosol; Golgi membrane; plasma membrane; protein-containing complex; glutamatergic synapse
Biological process	positive regulation of endocytosis; positive regulation of protein secretion; very-low-density lipoprotein particle assembly; mitigation of host defenses by virus; positive regulation of calcium ion-dependent exocytosis; regulation of receptor internalization; synaptic vesicle budding; small GTPase mediated signal transduction; cellular copper ion homeostasis; long-term depression; antigen processing and presentation of exogenous peptide antigen via MHC class II; Golgi to transport vesicle transport; post-Golgi vesicle-mediated transport; actin filament organization; lysosomal membrane organization; positive regulation of ER to Golgi vesicle-mediated transport; dendritic spine organization; regulation of phospholipid metabolic process; regulation of Arp2/3 complex-mediated actin nucleation; positive regulation of late endosome to lysosome transport; protein transport; phosphatidylinositol biosynthetic process; positive regulation of sodium ion transmembrane transport; vesicle-mediated transport; positive regulation of catalytic activity; positive regulation of dendritic spine development; mitotic cleavage furrow ingression; interleukin-12-mediated signaling pathway; transport; intracellular protein transport; Golgi to plasma membrane transport; postsynaptic actin cytoskeleton organization
Sources:Amigo / QuickGO
Orthologs
Databases	NCBI: entry; OMA: entry
Species	Human	Mouse
Entrez	375	11840
Ensembl	ENSG00000143761	ENSMUSG00000048076
UniProt	P84077	P84078
RefSeq (mRNA)	NM_001658; NM_001024226; NM_001024227; NM_001024228	NM_001130408; NM_007476
RefSeq (protein)	NP_001019397; NP_001019398; NP_001019399; NP_001649	NP_001123880; NP_031502
Location (UCSC)	Chr 1: 228.08 – 228.1 Mb	Chr 11: 59.1 – 59.12 Mb
PubMed search
- Wikidata
View/Edit Human	View/Edit Mouse

ADP-ribosylation factor 1 is a protein that in humans is encoded by the ARF1 gene.

== Function ==
ADP-ribosylation factor 1 (ARF1) is a member of the human ARF gene family. The family members encode small guanine nucleotide-binding proteins that stimulate the ADP-ribosyltransferase activity of cholera toxin and play a role in vesicular trafficking as activators of phospholipase D. The gene products, including 6 ARF proteins and 11 ARF-like proteins, constitute a family of the RAS superfamily. The ARF proteins are categorized as class I (ARF1, ARF2 and ARF3), class II (ARF4 and ARF5) and class III (ARF6), and members of each class share a common gene organization. The ARF1 protein is localized to the Golgi apparatus and has a central role in intra-Golgi transport. Multiple alternatively spliced transcript variants encoding the same protein have been found for this gene.

The major mechanism of action of Brefeldin A is through inhibition of ARF1.

== Interactions ==
ARF1 has been shown to interact with:

- CHRM3,
- COPB1,
- GGA3, and
- PLD2.
