= ARF5 =

Protein-coding gene in the species Homo sapiens

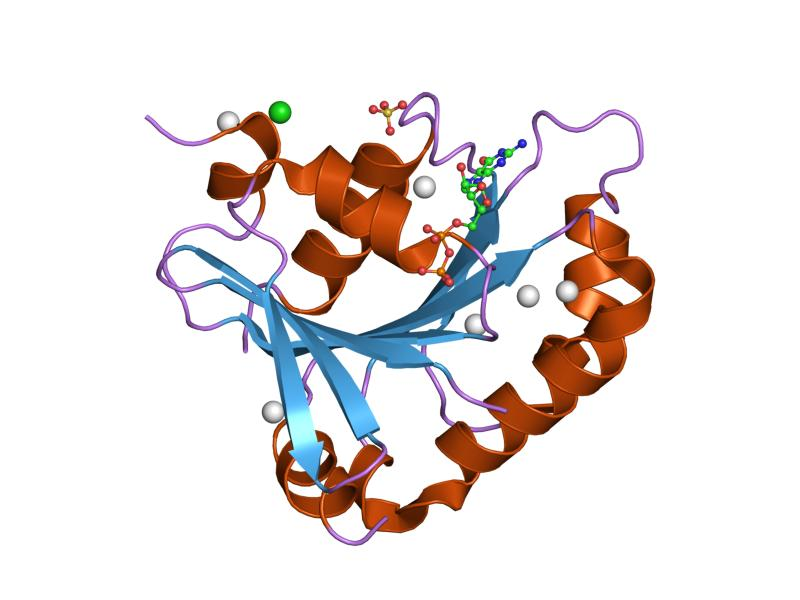

Identifiers
- Aliases: ARF5, ADP ribosylation factor 5
- External IDs: OMIM: 103188; MGI: 99434; GeneCards: ARF5
Available structures
PDB	Ortholog search: PDBe RCSB
PDB	List of PDB id codes 2B6H

Gene location (Human)
Chr.	Chromosome 7 (human)
Band	7q32.1	Start	127,588,386 bp
Band	7q32.1	End	127,591,700 bp

Gene location (Mouse)
Chr.	Chromosome 6 (mouse)
Band	6|6 A3.3	Start	28,423,559 bp
Band	6|6 A3.3	End	28,426,601 bp
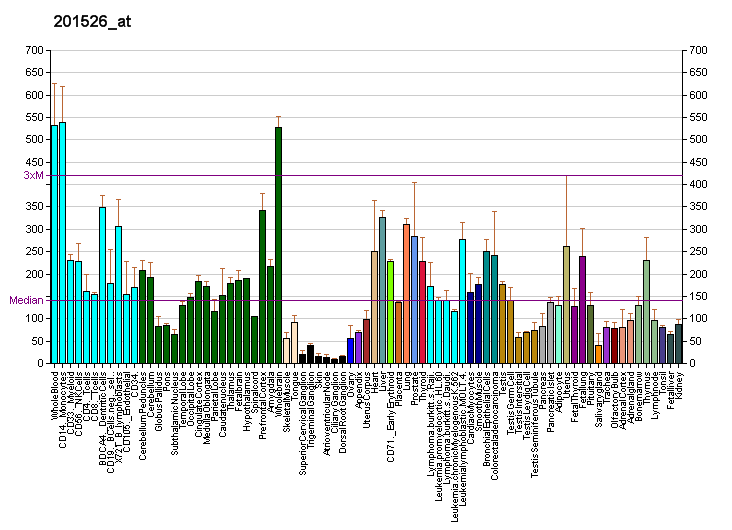
RNA expression pattern
Bgee	Human / Mouse (ortholog); Top expressed in: prefrontal cortex; Brodmann area 9; skin of leg; right frontal lobe; skin of abdomen; body of pancreas; right hemisphere of cerebellum; primary visual cortex; superior frontal gyrus; granulocyte / Top expressed in: lip; dentate gyrus of hippocampal formation granule cell; granulocyte; primary visual cortex; superior frontal gyrus; ventricular zone; perirhinal cortex; right kidney; yolk sac; entorhinal cortex; More reference expression data
BioGPS	More reference expression data
Gene ontology
Molecular function	nucleotide binding; GTP binding; protein binding; GTPase activity
Cellular component	cytoplasm; perinuclear region of cytoplasm; plasma membrane; Golgi apparatus; extracellular exosome; intracellular anatomical structure; membrane
Biological process	protein transport; small GTPase mediated signal transduction; vesicle-mediated transport; retrograde vesicle-mediated transport, Golgi to endoplasmic reticulum; transport; intracellular protein transport; Golgi to plasma membrane transport
Sources:Amigo / QuickGO
Orthologs
Databases	NCBI: entry; OMA: entry
Species	Human	Mouse
Entrez	381	11844
Ensembl	ENSG00000004059	ENSMUSG00000020440
UniProt	P84085	P84084
RefSeq (mRNA)	NM_001662	NM_007480
RefSeq (protein)	NP_001653	NP_031506
Location (UCSC)	Chr 7: 127.59 – 127.59 Mb	Chr 6: 28.42 – 28.43 Mb
PubMed search
- Wikidata
View/Edit Human	View/Edit Mouse

ADP-ribosylation factor 5 is a protein that in humans is encoded by the ARF5 gene.

ADP-ribosylation factor 5 (ARF5) is a member of the human ARF gene family. These genes encode small guanine nucleotide-binding proteins that stimulate the ADP-ribosyltransferase activity of cholera toxin and play a role in vesicular trafficking and as activators of phospholipase D. The gene products include 6 ARF proteins and 11 ARF-like proteins and constitute 1 family of the RAS superfamily. The ARF proteins are categorized as class I (ARF1, ARF2, and ARF3), class II (ARF4 and ARF5) and class III (ARF6). The members of each class share a common gene organization. The ARF5 gene spans approximately 3.2kb of genomic DNA and contains six exons and five introns.

== Interactions ==
ARF5 has been shown to interact with ARFIP2.
