= Endoplasmic reticulum resident protein =

ER retention refers to proteins that are retained in the endoplasmic reticulum, or ER, after folding; these are known as ER resident proteins.

Protein localization to the ER often depends on certain sequences of amino acids located at the N terminus or C terminus. These sequences are known as signal peptides, molecular signatures, or sorting signals.

The classical ER retention signal is the C-terminal KDEL sequence for lumen bound proteins and KKXX (signal sequence is located in cytoplasm) for transmembrane localization. These signals allow for retrieval from the Golgi apparatus by ER retention receptors, effectively maintaining the protein in the ER. Other mechanisms for ER retention are being studied but are not as well characterized as signal retention.

== ER retention receptor proteins ==
- KDELR1
- KDELR2
- KDELR3

== See also ==
- KKXX (amino acid sequence)
- KDEL (amino acid sequence)
- Signal peptide
- Protein targeting
