= Rav (disambiguation) =

Rav (Hebrew: רב) is the Hebrew word for rabbi.

Rav, RAV, or R.A.V. may also refer to:

== Places ==
- Rav, Kutch, a village in Rapar Taluka of Kutch district of Gujarat, India

== People ==
- Rav, a common name for Abba Arikha (175–247), Jewish Talmudist
- Joseph B. Soloveitchik, a rabbi known to many as "the Rav"

== Brands and enterprises ==
- 90.7 RAV FM, the on-air brand of CFU758, a low-power radio station in Thornhill, Ontario
- Reliable AntiVirus, a core technology of Windows Live OneCare
- Toyota RAV4, an automobile
- Real America's Voice, an American right-wing streaming, cable and satellite television channel

== Transport ==
- RAV, the IATA code for Cravo Norte Airport, an airport in Colombia
- RAV, Ravenglass railway station's National Rail station code
- RAV Line, the working name for the Canada Line, a rapid transit line Metro Vancouver, British Columbia

== Other uses ==
- R.A.V. v. City of St. Paul 505 U.S. 377 (1992), a United States Supreme Court case involving freedom of speech
- Rav Aluf, the highest aluf rank in the Israel Defense Forces
- Reweighted approval voting, an alternative name for sequential proportional approval voting
- Ribosome-associated vesicle, a sub compartment of the rough endoplasmic reticulum
