= KDELR =

KDEL (Lys-Asp-Glu-Leu) endoplasmic reticulum protein retention receptors (KDELR) are the members of a group of receptor proteins:

- KDELR1
- KDELR2
- KDELR3
