= TMEM273 =

Protein-coding gene in the species Homo sapiens

Identifiers
- Aliases: TMEM273, chromosome 10 open reading frame 128, C10orf128, transmembrane protein 273
- External IDs: MGI: 1916319; GeneCards: TMEM273

Gene location (Human)
Chr.	Chromosome 10 (human)
Band	10q11.23	Start	49,154,725 bp
Band	10q11.23	End	49,188,585 bp

Gene location (Mouse)
Chr.	Chromosome 14 (mouse)
Band	14|14 B	Start	32,507,920 bp
Band	14|14 B	End	32,539,941 bp
RNA expression pattern
Bgee	Human / Mouse (ortholog); Top expressed in: Achilles tendon; C1 segment; apex of heart; palpebral conjunctiva; gallbladder; smooth muscle tissue; subcutaneous adipose tissue; spleen; lymph node; visceral pleura / Top expressed in: granulocyte; bone marrow; spleen; calvaria; stroma of bone marrow; white adipose tissue; duodenum; blood; dentate gyrus of hippocampal formation granule cell; muscle of thigh; More reference expression data
BioGPS	n/a
Orthologs
Databases	NCBI: entry; OMA: entry
Species	Human	Mouse
Entrez	170371	69069
Ensembl	ENSG00000204161	ENSMUSG00000041707
UniProt	Q5T292; Q5T290	E9PVZ2
RefSeq (mRNA)	NM_001010863; NM_001288740; NM_001288741; NM_001288742; NM_001288743 NM_001353330; NM_001353331	NM_001163616
RefSeq (protein)	NP_001010863; NP_001275669; NP_001275670; NP_001275671; NP_001275672 NP_001340259; NP_001340260	NP_001157088
Location (UCSC)	Chr 10: 49.15 – 49.19 Mb	Chr 14: 32.51 – 32.54 Mb
PubMed search
- Wikidata
View/Edit Human	View/Edit Mouse

Transmembrane protein 273 (TMEM273) aka C10orf128, is a protein which in humans is encoded by the TMEM273 gene. This protein is found within the topological domain as TMEM273 is a single-pass type I membrane protein. Although the function TMEM273 is relatively novel within the scientific community, existing research has shown that the protein may mediate histone trimethylation modifications, immunosuppression, and macrophage chemotaxis inhibition. TMEM273 expression is ubiquitous and is associated with various diseases and illnesses. Recent studies have revealed likely links to lung adenocarcinomas and acute myeloid leukemia

== Gene ==
This gene is located on chromosome 10, long arm, region 1, band 1, sub-band 23 (10q11.23), and oriented on the minus strand in Homo sapiens, and contains 7 exons. The gene spans 33,656 base pairs. A common alias of TMEM273 is C10orf128. The locus of TMEM273 is denoted by the red line in the figure below.

TMEM273 Genomic Location on Chromosome 10

== mRNA ==
TMEM273 gene encodes 7 transcript variants. Transcript variant 2 contains an alternate exon in the central coding region, which results in a frameshift, compared to variant 1. However, the encoded isoform 2 has a longer and more distinct C-terminus. Transcript variant 2 is 1601 nt long, contains 7 exons, and is considered the MANE Select (most representative) variant.

Transcript Variant	Accession #	Length (nt)	Exons	Protein Isofom	Accession #	Length (aa)
Transcript Variant 1	NM_001010863.4	1522	6	1 precursor	NP_001010863.1	105
Transcript Variant 2	NM_001288740.3	1601	7	2 precursor	NP_001275669.1	129
Transcript Variant 3	NM_001288741.3	1491	5	Isoform 3	NP_001275670.1	91
Transcript Variant 4	NM_001288742.3	1841	5	Isoform 4	NP_001275671.1	123
Transcript Variant 5	NM_001288743.3	2029	7	Isoform 5	NP_001275672.1	172
Transcript Variant 6	NM_001353330.2	1679	7	Isoform 6	NP_001340259.1	155
Transcript Variant 7	NM_001353331.2	1872	6	Isoform 7	NP_001340260.1	111

=== Conceptual Translation ===
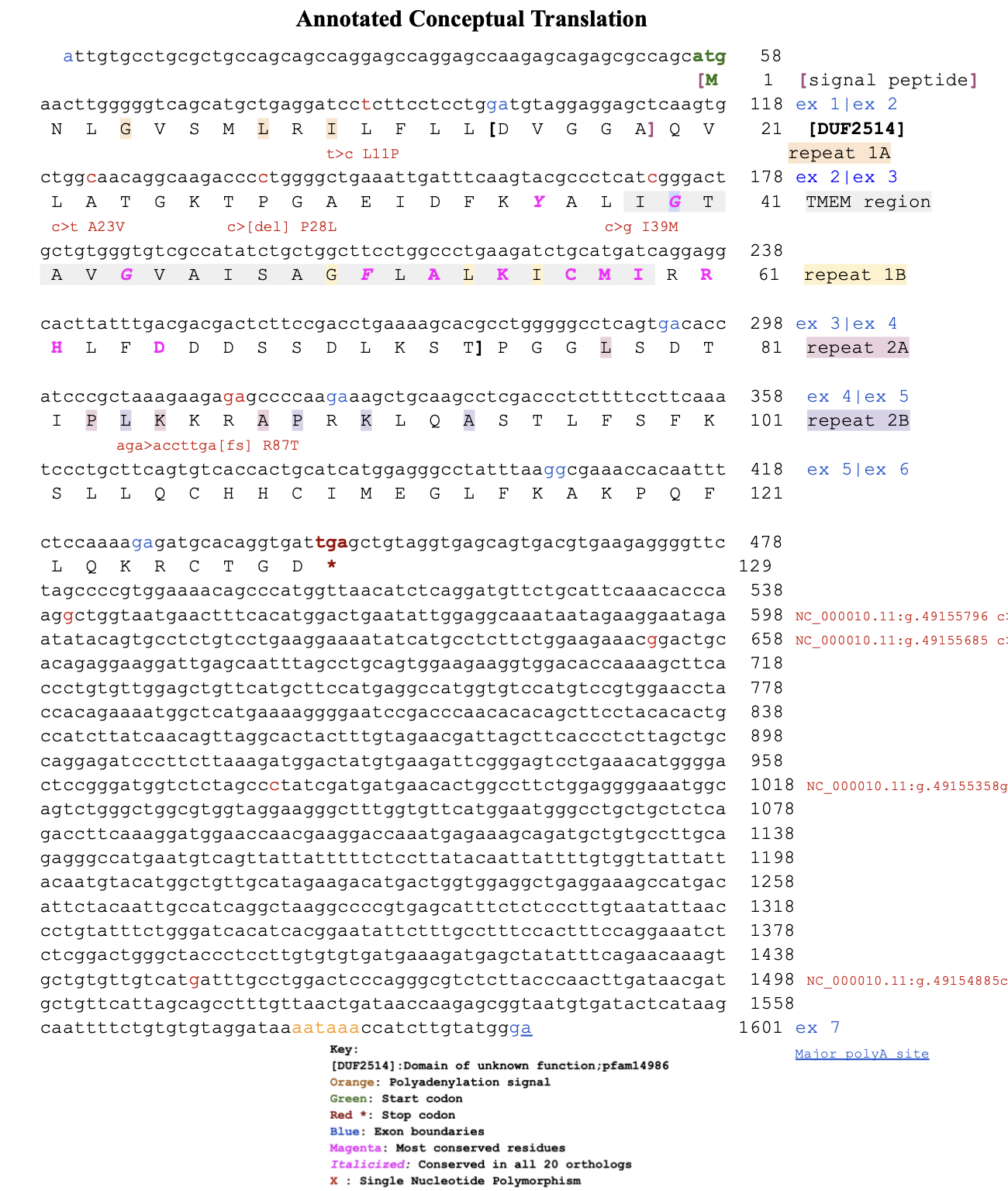
Annotated Conceptual Translation of Human TMEM273 Protein Isoform 2

Conceptual translation of the Human TMEM273 isoform 2 protein begins with the 5' UTR and ends with the 3' UTR. Between the untranslated regions lies the coding sequence. The figure is annotated with start and stop codons, exon boundaries, highly conserved regions among distant orthologs, internal repeats, domains of unknown function (DUF regions), signal peptides, transmembrane regions, poly-A sites, and single nucleotide polymorphisms.

== Protein ==
TMEM273 isoform 2 contains 129 amino acids and has an approximate molecular weight of 14 kDa with an isoelectric point of 9.5.

=== Expression ===
TMEM 273 expression is ubiquitous and variable among tissues. It has the highest expression in the lungs, spleen, and uterus respectively for total RNA in normal tissue. Expression appears to be lower in the brain, skeletal muscle, liver, and in endocrine glands. This suggests that TMEM273 is likely not highly involved in the processes of these tissues.

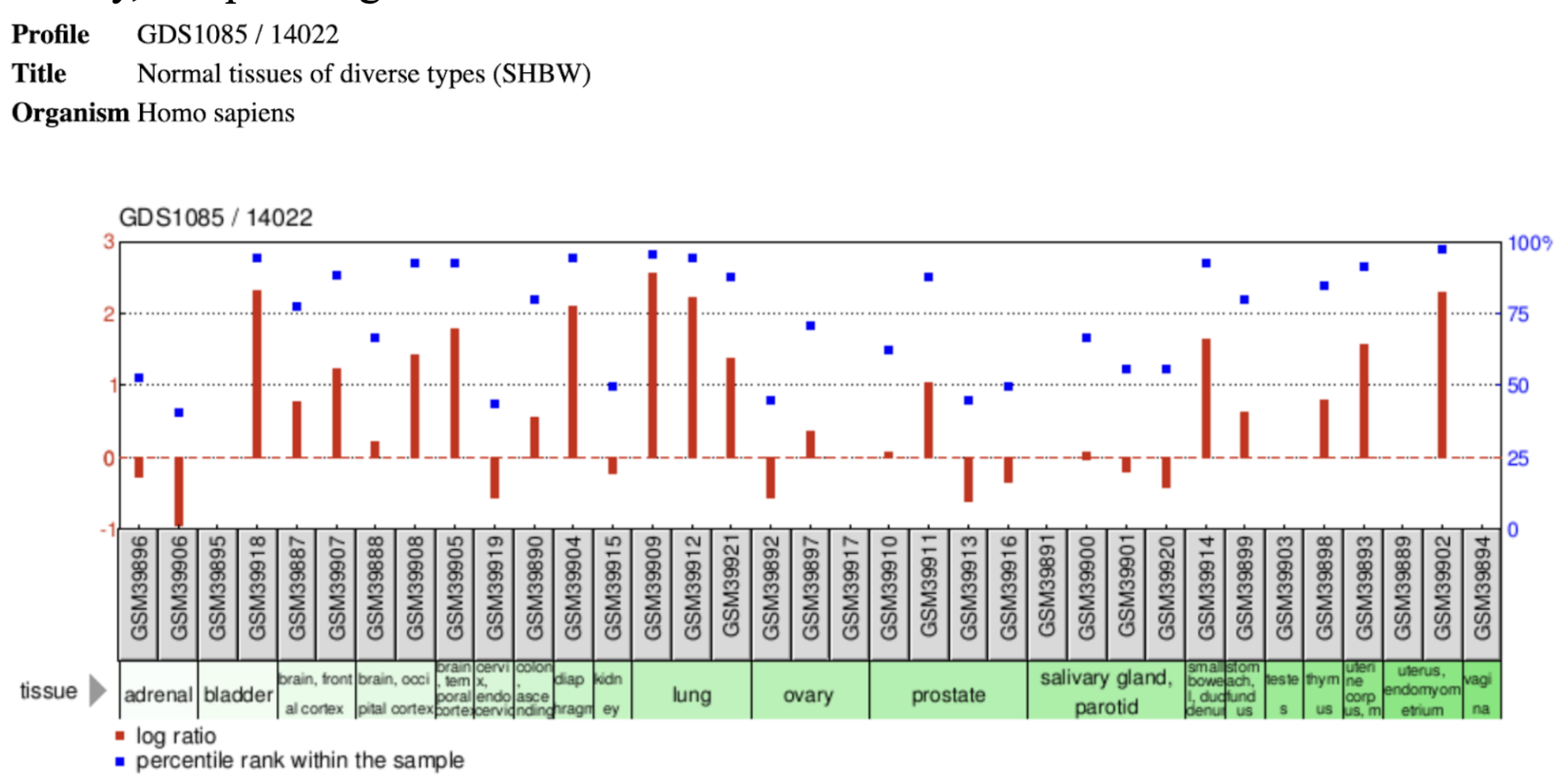
Human TMEM273 Microarray tissue expression from NCBI Geo

==== Expression in abnormal tissue ====
TMEM273 is highly expressed in lung adenocarcinomas, colorectal cancers, and acute myeloid leukemia .

=== Subcellular localization ===
TMEM273 is predominantly localized in the cell membrane, with transmembrane association. The protein also has nuclear, endoplasmic reticulum, and mitochondrion subcellular localization, but with lower confidence.

=== Structure ===
==== Secondary structure ====
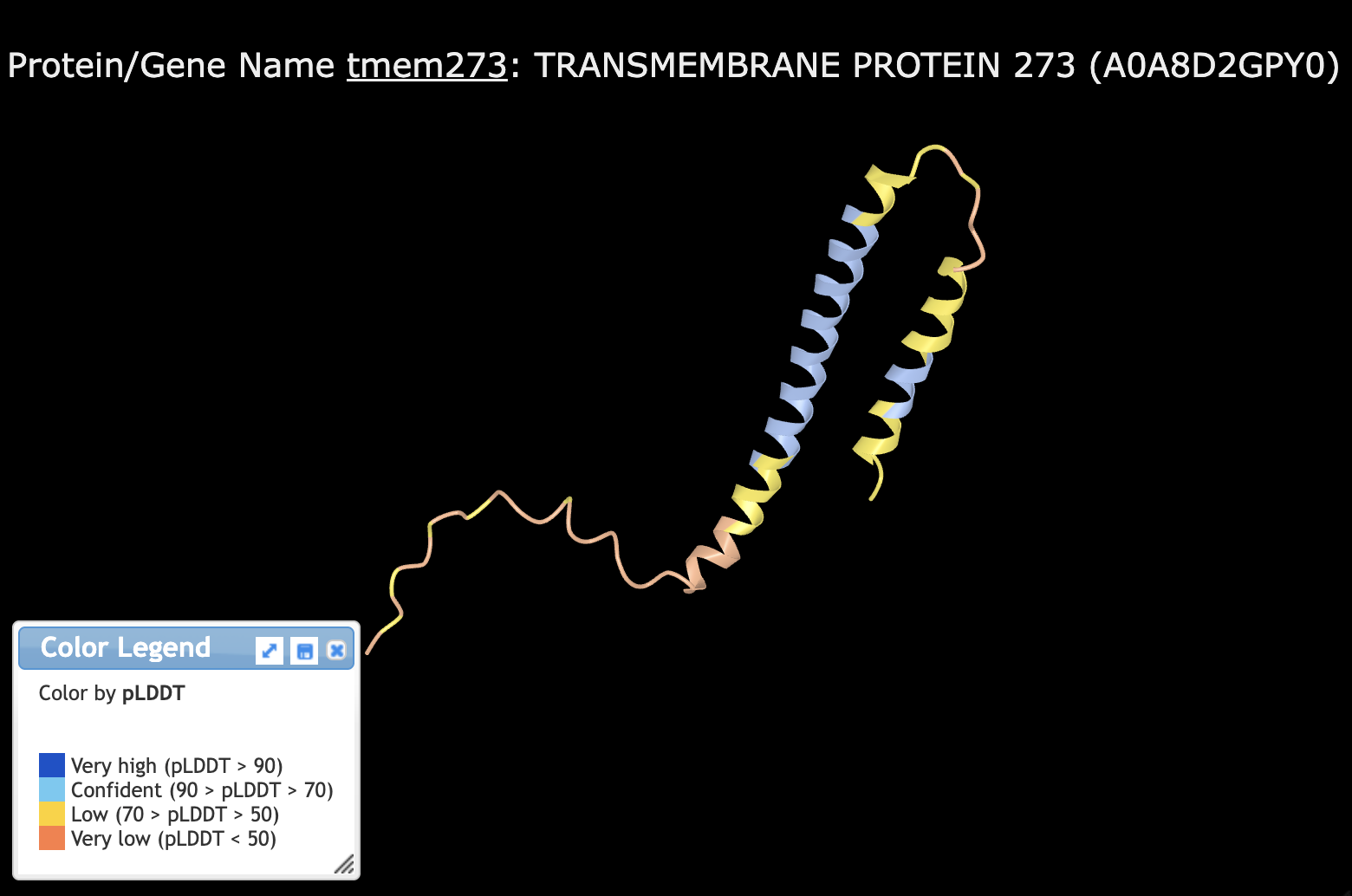
Human TMEM 273 Tertiary Structure

Secondary structure analyses yield that TMEM273 Isoform 2 contains 2 alpha helices and 2 beta sheets, although, these are not in agreement with the predicted tertiary structure via the AlphaFold database.

==== Tertiary structure ====
TMEM273 contains no disulfide bond linkages.

=== Motifs ===
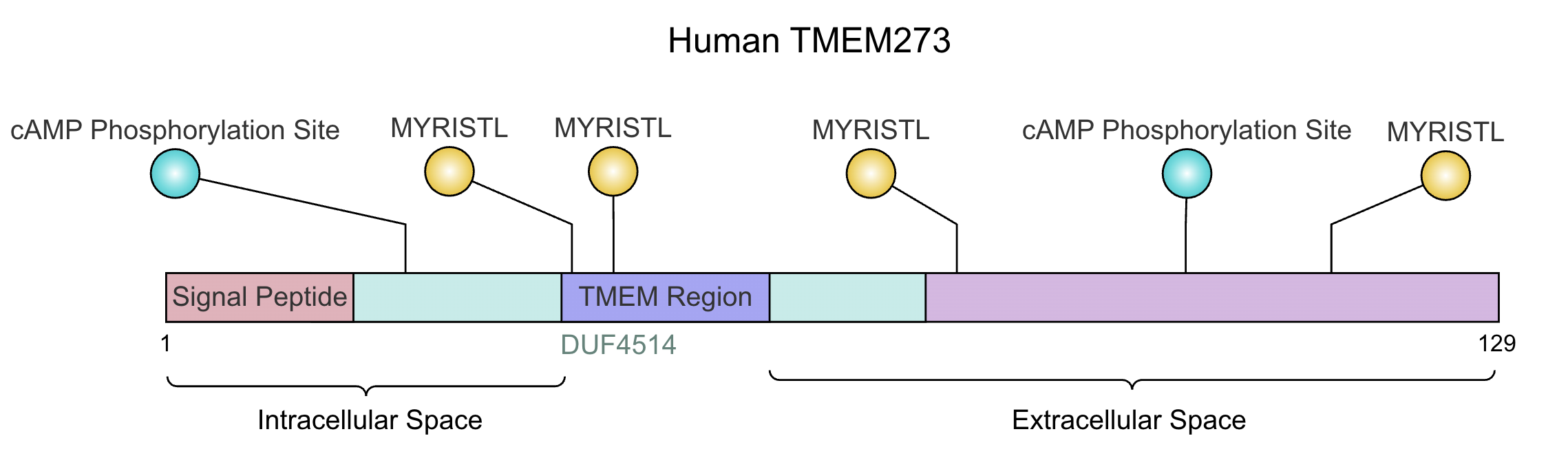
Schematic Representation of Human TMEM273

Motif	Position	Description
MYRISTYL	40..45; 44..49; 77..82; 113..118	PS00008, N-myristoylation site.
CAMP_PHOSPHO_SITE	124..127	PS00004, cAMP- and cGMP-dependent protein kinase phosphorylation site.
PKC_PHOSPHO_SITE	24..26; 99..101	PS00005, Protein kinase C phosphorylation site.
DUF4515	15..74	PF14986, Domain of unknown function (DUF4514)

=== Post-Translational Modifications ===
TMEM273 is predicted to undergo several phosphorylations and myristoylations.

=== Interacting Proteins ===
V-set and transmembrane domain containing 4 (VSTM4), Anthrax toxin receptor-like (ANTXRL), and Arf-GAP with GTPase (AGAP6) are experimentally verified via SNP array to interact with TMEM273. VSTM4 localizes to the extracellular region and plasma membrane of cells, which is consistent with the localization of TMEM273. VSTM4 is involved in endothelial cell proliferation, retina blood vessel maintenance, and vasculature development. ANTXRL also localizes to the plasma membrane and is involved in metal ion binding. AGAP6 localizes to the cytosol and nucleus and enables GTPase activator activity.

== Evolutionary history and homology ==
The TMEM gene family is very large and consists of integral membrane proteins serving vastly different functions. In addition to their wide variety of functions, TMEM proteins are expressed in many different organ types, and their mediation in physiological processes makes them attractive proteins to study disease etiology. TMEM273 first appeared approximately 462 million years ago in Chondrichthyes (cartilaginous fish). NCBI pBLAST yielded 2 splice isoforms of TMEM273 in the sevengill sharpnose shark, one of the most distantly related orthologs.

Class	Common Name	Genus and species	Taxonomic Group	Date of Divergence (MYA)	Sequence Length aa	% Sequence Identity	% Sequence Similarity	Accession #
Mammalia	Human	Homo sapiens	Hominidae	0	129	100	100	NP_001275669.1
	Chimpanzee	Pan troglodytes	Hominidae	6.4	127	96.9	97.7	PNI21926.1
	Ugandan red colobus	Piliocolobus tephrosceles	Cercopithecidae	28.8	128	59.1	63.1	XP_023085927.1
	Arctic fox	Vulpes lagopus	Canidae	94	115	53.4	64.9	XP_041586396.1
	Mouse	Mus musculus	Muridae	87	95	44.2	49.6	NP_001157088.1
	Sugar glider	Petaurus breviceps papuanus	Petauridae	160	116	40.1	52.6	XP_068923340.1
	Tammar wallaby	Notamacropus eugenii	Macropodidae	160	81	37.8	43.7	XP_072483585.1
	Blue whale	Balaenoptera musculus	Balaenopteridae	94	143	37.2	48.1	XP_036683970.1
Aves/Reptilia	Whooping crane	Grus americana	Gruidae	319	103	23.4	36.9	XP_054688426.1
	Chinese softshell turtle	Pelodiscus sinensis	Trionychidae	319	104	21.1	36.6	XP_025037933.1
	African ostrich	Struthio camelus	Struthionidae	319	152	20.7	34.1	XP_068806302.1
	Greater sage-grouse	Centrocercus urophasianus	Phasianidae	319	103	20.3	34.3	XP_042674525.1
Amphibia	Two-lined Caecilian	Rhinatrema bivittatum	Rhinatrematidae	352	95	24.6	38.8	XP_029466624.1
	African bullfrog	Pyxicephalus adspersus	Pyxicephalidae	352	110	21.5	41	XP_072281286.1
Bony Fish	American shad	Alosa sapidissima	Clupeidae	429	118	25.2	45.9	XP_041942188.1
	European eel	Anguilla anguilla	Anguillidae	429	96	24.8	39.1	XP_035258627.1
	Channel Catfish	Ictalurus punctatus	Ictaluridae	429	89	21.7	35.7	XP_017339287.1
Cartilaginous Fish	Australian ghostshark	Callorhinchus milii	Callorhinchidae	462	101	23.2	38.4	XP_007902766.1
	Lesser electric ray	Narcine bancroftii	Narcinidae	462	92	19.3	34.3	XP_069741440.1
	Sharpnose sevengill shark	Heptranchias perlo	Hexanchidae	462	96	18.6	32.1	XP_067828468.1

=== Phylogeny ===
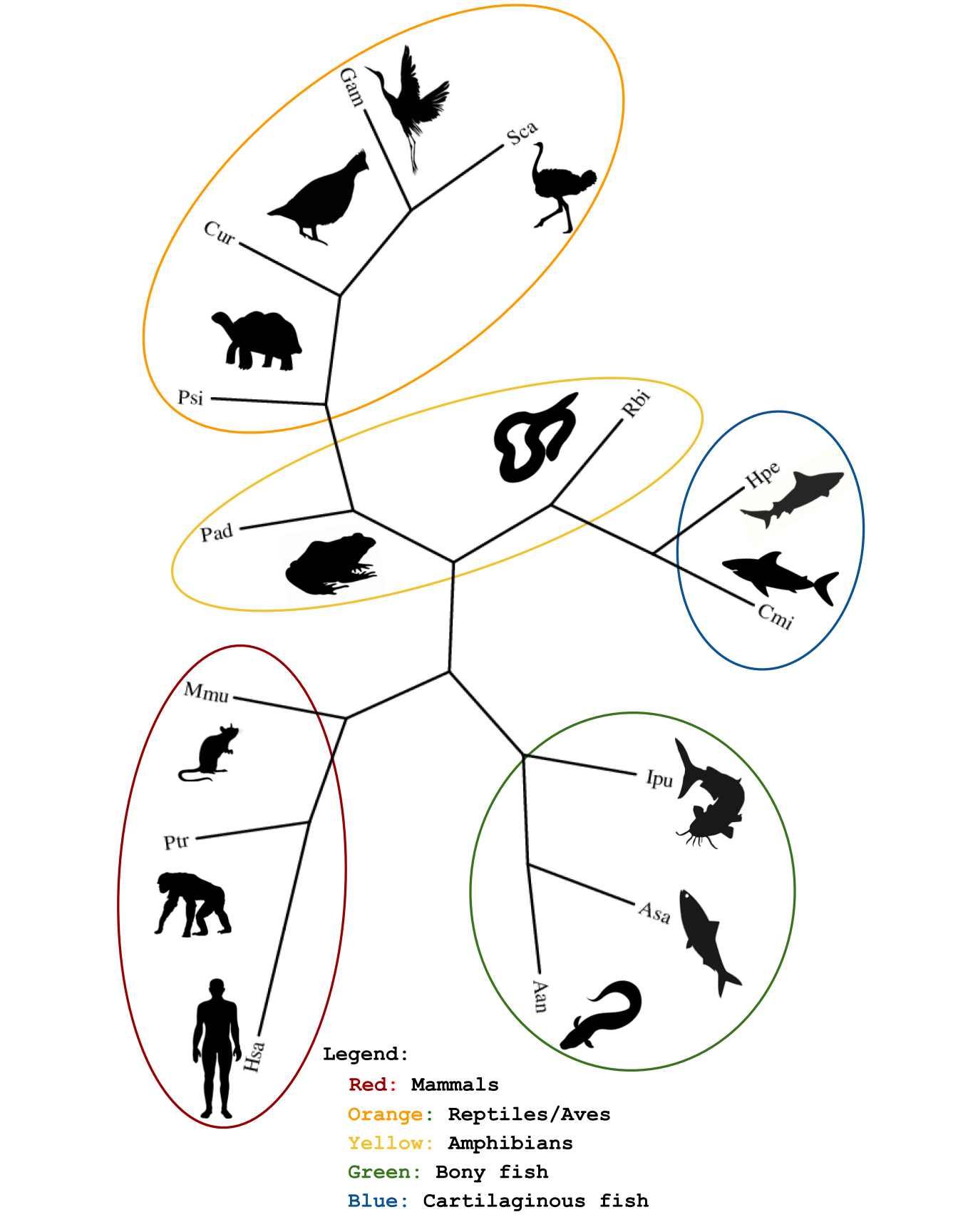
Unrooted Phylogenetic Tree of Orthologs of TMEM273

=== Divergence ===
TMEM273 exhibits a higher evolutionary rate than cytochrome c. This is consistent with patterns seen in other rapidly evolving proteins such as fibrinogen alpha.

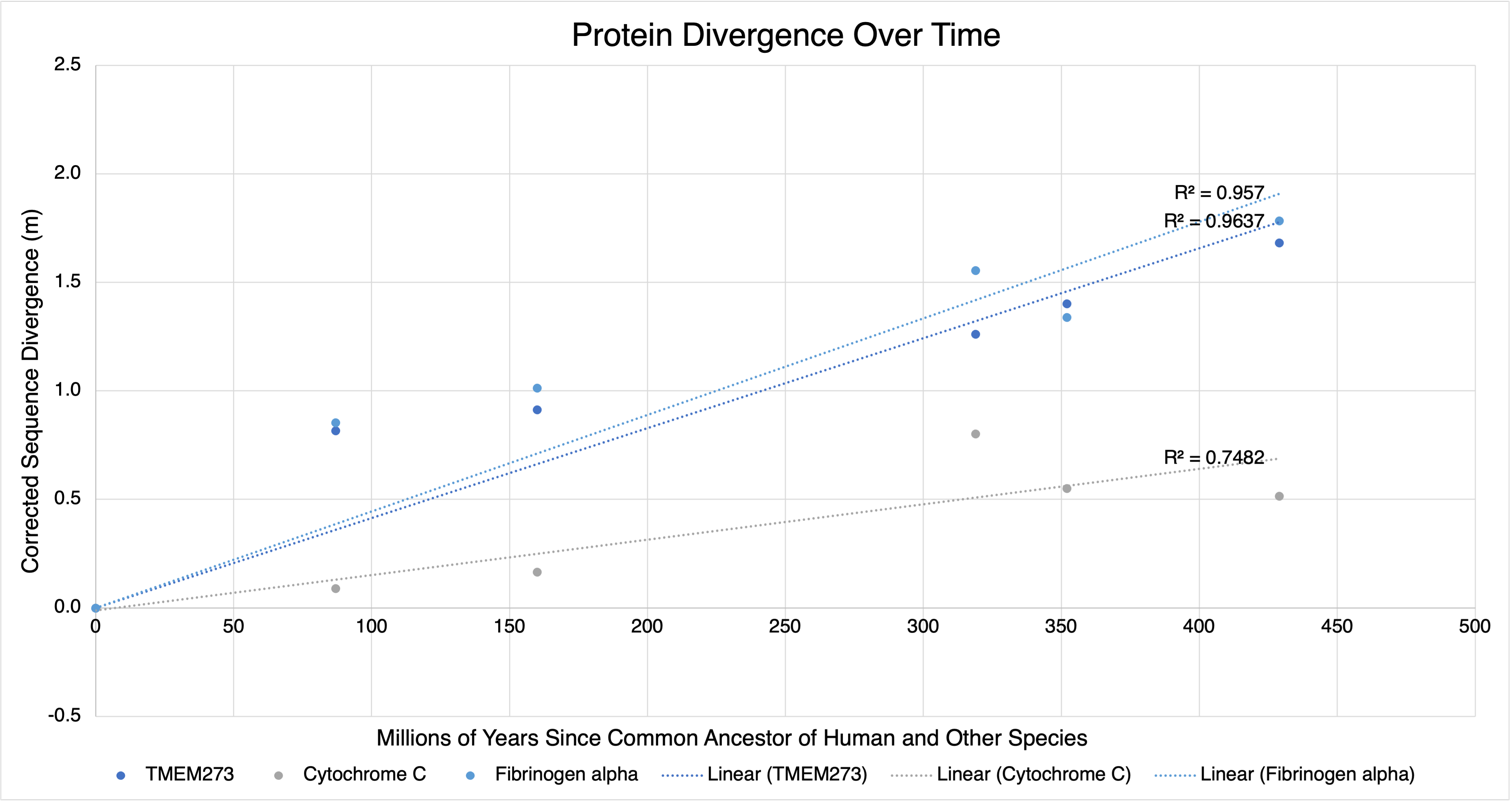
Corrected Sequence Divergence of TMEM273, Cytochrome C, and Fibrinogen Alpha Over Time

== Clinical significance ==
Investigation of p53 mutation-based prognostic risk signatures for acute myeloid leukemia (AML) found TMEM273 to be a potential prognostic biomarker for patients with AML. Although this data is not fully extrapolated, an additional study into FMS-like tyrosine kinase 3 (FLT3) found TMEM273 to be expressed in FLT3-mutated AML. FLT3 is essential to hematopoiesis, and mutations in this gene are commonly seen in AML. Therefore it is possible that TMEM273's link to AML is a result of its mediation of FLT3.

In a study targeting Ebola-associated genes within the human genome, TMEM273 was found to be a signal peptide expressed in blood plasma, indicating that the protein may play a role in controlling protein secretion and trafficking. Another study investigating surrogate biomarkers for protective immunity against Chlamydia trachomatis revealed TMEM273 to be a prerequisite for interleukin-13 (IL-13) production by CD4 clones, suggesting the protein to be a T-Cell biomarker. Specifically, TMEM273 was prominent in the CD4 and CD8 signatures of the genital tract. The implication that TMEM273 is a T-Cell biomarker could potentially illuminate why the protein is, prevalent in many different types of malignant tissue.

An investigation into the prognosis of patients with lung adenocarcinoma (LUAD) found that poor prognosis was consistently related to histone hypotrimethylation level, decreased secretion of chemokines, macrophage chemotaxis inhibition, and immunosuppression; A TMEM-based signature was found to be closely related to these prognoses. The TMEM signature includes TMEM273, TMEM125 and TMEM163. The involvement of these proteins in mediating histone trimethylation modifications, immunosuppression, and macrophage chemotaxis inhibition is likely the cause of this result.
