= TMEM143 =

Protein-coding gene in humans

Identifiers
- Aliases: TMEM143, transmembrane protein 143
- External IDs: MGI: 1917459; GeneCards: TMEM143

Gene location (Human)
Chr.	Chromosome 19 (human)
Band	19q13.33	Start	48,332,356 bp
Band	19q13.33	End	48,364,059 bp

Gene location (Mouse)
Chr.	Chromosome 7 (mouse)
Band	7|7 B3	Start	45,546,365 bp
Band	7|7 B3	End	45,566,837 bp
RNA expression pattern
Bgee	Human / Mouse (ortholog); Top expressed in: muscle of thigh; apex of heart; Skeletal muscle tissue of biceps brachii; Skeletal muscle tissue of rectus abdominis; gastrocnemius muscle; left ventricle; right ventricle; right auricle of heart; right lobe of liver; right adrenal gland / Top expressed in: interventricular septum; muscle of thigh; yolk sac; myocardium of ventricle; skeletal muscle tissue; brown adipose tissue; intercostal muscle; upper arm; triceps brachii muscle; soleus muscle; More reference expression data
BioGPS	n/a
Gene ontology
Molecular function	molecular function
Cellular component	mitochondrion; integral component of membrane; membrane
Biological process	biological process
Sources:Amigo / QuickGO
Orthologs
Databases	NCBI: entry; OMA: entry
Species	Human	Mouse
Entrez	55260	70209
Ensembl	ENSG00000161558	ENSMUSG00000002781
UniProt	Q96AN5	Q8VD26
RefSeq (mRNA)	NM_001303538; NM_001303539; NM_001303540; NM_018273	NM_144801
RefSeq (protein)	NP_001290467; NP_001290468; NP_001290469; NP_060743	NP_659050
Location (UCSC)	Chr 19: 48.33 – 48.36 Mb	Chr 7: 45.55 – 45.57 Mb
PubMed search
- Wikidata
View/Edit Human	View/Edit Mouse

TMEM143 (Transmembrane protein 143) is a protein that in humans is encoded by TMEM143 gene. TMEM143, a dual-pass protein (two transmembrane domains), is predicted to reside in the mitochondria and high expression has been found in both human skeletal muscle and the heart. Interaction with other proteins indicate that TMEM143 could potentially play a role in tumor suppression/expression and cancer regulation.

== Gene ==
Located on the negative strand of human DNA, TMEM143 spans 31,882 base pairs on human chromosome 19 (19q13.33), neighbored by genes Coiled-coil domain containing 114 (CCDC114) and ER lumen protein-retaining receptor 1 (KDELR1).

== Transcript ==
In humans, there are five transcript variants encoded by TMEM143 gene (1–5). Variant 1 is the longest mRNA transcript, with a coding region of 2577 nucleotides (nt) and a total of 8 exons, and possibly most indicative of function. Compared to variant 1, variant 2 (2472 nt, 424 amino acid protein) and variant 3 (2382nt, 394 amino acid protein) lack an in-frame exon in the 5' coding region while variant 4 (2277 nt, 359 amino acid protein) lacks two in-frame exons in the 5' coding region, all leading to an N-terminally truncated protein. Transcript variant 5 is a non-coding RNA, approximately 2231 nt long, resulting in a transcript candidate for nonsense-mediated mRNA.

== Protein ==
There are four protein isoforms, corresponding to a matching variant. Variant 1 codes for isoform a (the longest protein), and variants 2, 3, 4 code for isoforms b, c, and d, respectively. TMEM143 isoform a is 459 amino acids in length, has a molecular weight of 51.6 kDa and an isoelectric point of 9.7 in humans. A domain of unknown function (DUF3754) is present within which two transmembrane domains reside, 24 and 16 amino acids in length, both helical in nature.

Scheme of TMEM143 protein: gray markers correspond to phosphorylation sites, red markers correspond to kinase-specific phosphorylation sites, and green sections signify transmembrane domains; DUF3754 is also illustrated

The transmembrane domains encompass the uncharged region present at amino acids 278 to 302. A predicted mitochondrial target peptide resides at the N-terminus spanning 52 amino acids before the cleavage site between amino acids M-51 and G-52. In addition, phosphorylation sites, both general and kinase-specific, were predicted to be found throughout the protein, indicating the location of the protein inside the cell.

== Homology ==
=== Orthologs ===
Orthologs have been identified in more than 85 vertebrate species. No TMEM143 orthologs have yet to be identified in birds.

There are currently 85 ortholog species, however all exist as vertebrates only (with the exception of birds), the most distant being Latimeria chalumnae (coelacanth). DUF3754 appears in a majority of the orthologs, a generally conserved region, with slight amino acid alterations to the sequence. This domain has been found in organisms as diverse as bacteria and archaea, however there are no known orthologs in either organismal domain.

=== Paralogs ===
There are no known paralogs for the human TMEM143 sequence.

== Expression and function ==
=== Tissue presence ===
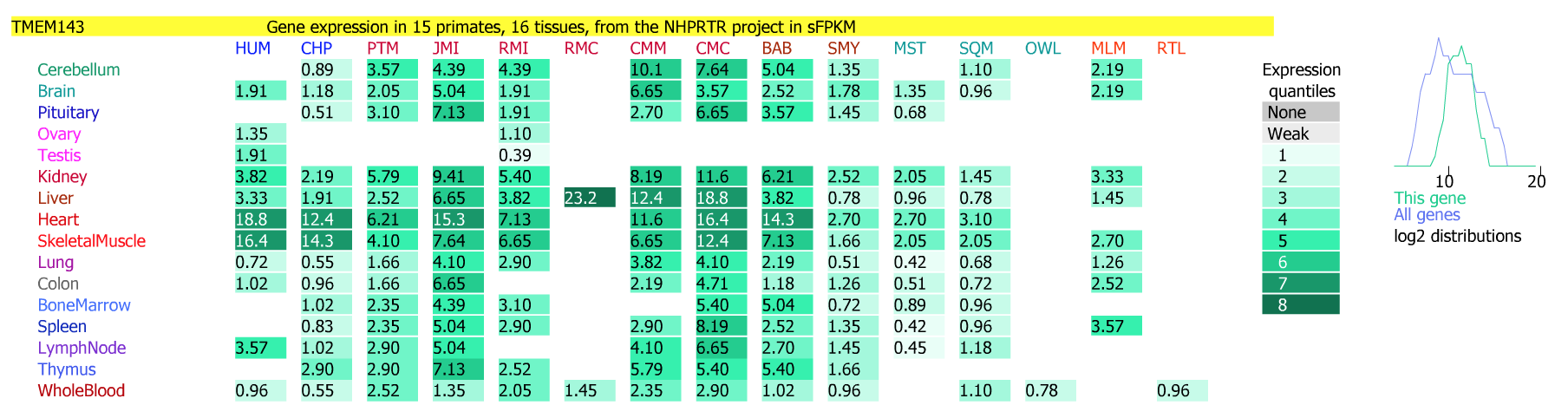
TMEM143 expression in Humans and other primates; In humans, the heart and skeletal muscle exhibit high expression (18.8 and 16.4, respectively)

Possible human expression of TMEM143 protein occurs in Jurkat cells (T lymphocyte). Organelle association puts TMEM143 in the mitochondria as an integral protein in the membrane, as well as the predicted of presence in the plasma membrane, endoplasmic reticulum, extracellular matrix and the Golgi apparatus.

High expression has been found in the heart and skeletal muscle, as indicated through human expression profiling. Microarray expression of normal human tissues also predict expression in the heart and skeletal muscle, a 95-97 percentile rank (amongst other tissues tested for normal human expression of TMEM143).

=== Interactions ===
Through text mining, TMEM143 is shown to have interactions with seven different proteins in humans: Zinc finger protein 541 (ZNF541), DNA-damage inducible 1 homolog 2 (DD12), Paraneoplastic Ma antigen family-like 2 (PNMAL2), Kelch-like 31(JLHL31), Chromosome 14 open reading frame 28 (C14orf28), Chromosome 14 open reading frame 28 (TRIN71), and Cytoplasmic polyadenylation element binding protein 2 (CPEB).

ZNF541 and PNMAL2, in relation to TMEM143, have been documented as having a role in the allelic loss of q13.3 of chromosome 19. This loss results in documented cases of malignant gliomas, neuroblastomas, and ovarian carcinomas, all suggesting a tumor suppression gene or genes in this region. While TMEM143 is not directly referred to in research in this area, it is present in this region on the chromosome, indicating a potential functional role in humans.

Interactions between TMEM143 and DD12, JLHL31, C14orf28, TRIN71, and CPEB (in humans) have been documented through microarray data. Illustrating predicted gene regulation with different microRNA (miRNA) under ionizing radiation conditions, TMEM143 and DD12, JLHL31, C14orf28, TRIN71, and CPEB all share predicted regulatory miRNAs. TMEM143 has also been found to be associated with adipocyte differentiation. Along with other genes, TMEM143 has been documented as a PPARγ (peroxisome proliferator-activated receptor gamma) target. This indicates the possibility of TMEM143 participation in lipid metabolic pathways and lipid cell differentiation
