= Vesicular transport protein =

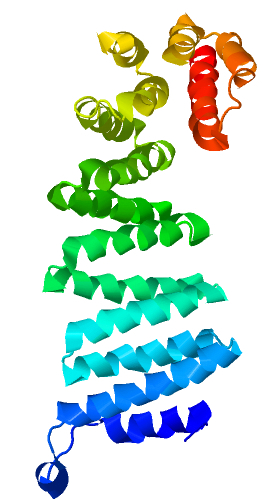
Crystal structure of the vesicular transport protein

A vesicular transport protein, or vesicular transporter, is a membrane protein that regulates or facilitates the movement of specific molecules across a vesicle's membrane. As a result, vesicular transporters govern the concentration of molecules within a vesicle.

== Types ==
Examples include:

- Archain
- ARFs
- Clathrin
- Caveolin
- Dynamin and related proteins, such as the EHD protein family
- Rab proteins
- SNAREs
- Vesicular transport adaptor proteins e.g. Sorting nexins
- Synaptotagmin
- TRAPP complex
- Synaptophysin
- Auxilin

== Pathways ==
There are multiple pathways, each using its own coat and GTPase.

- COP 1 (Cytosolic coat protein complex ) : retrograde transport; Golgi → Endoplasmic reticulum
- COP 2 (Cytosolic coat protein complex ) : anterograde transport; RER →cis-Golgi
- Clathrin : trans-Golgi → Lysosomes, Plasma membrane → Endosomes (receptor-mediated endocytosis)

== See also ==
- Membrane transport protein
- Wikipedia:MeSH D12.776#MeSH D12.776.543.990 --- vesicular transport proteins
