= ACTL7A =

Protein-coding gene in the species Homo sapiens

Identifiers
- Aliases: ACTL7A, actin like 7A
- External IDs: OMIM: 604303; MGI: 1343051; GeneCards: ACTL7A
Available structures
PDB	Ortholog search: PDBe RCSB
PDB	List of PDB id codes 2XQN

Gene location (Human)
Chr.	Chromosome 9 (human)
Band	9q31.3	Start	108,862,266 bp
Band	9q31.3	End	108,863,756 bp

Gene location (Mouse)
Chr.	Chromosome 4 (mouse)
Band	4 B3|4 31.66 cM	Start	56,743,413 bp
Band	4 B3|4 31.66 cM	End	56,744,925 bp
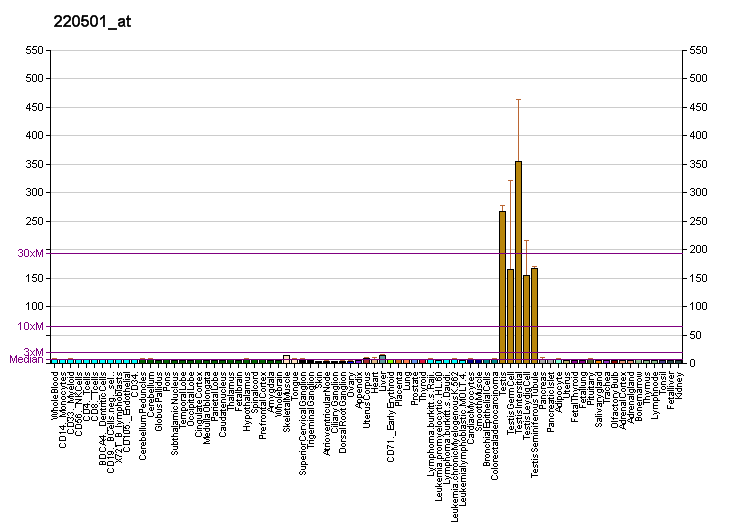
RNA expression pattern
Bgee	Human / Mouse (ortholog); Top expressed in: left testis; right testis; sperm; testicle; metanephros; tail of epididymis; embryo; right coronary artery; human musculoskeletal system; muscular system / Top expressed in: spermatid; seminiferous tubule; spermatocyte; embryo; upper arm; triceps brachii muscle; islet of Langerhans; More reference expression data
BioGPS	More reference expression data
Gene ontology
Molecular function	structural constituent of cytoskeleton; protein binding
Cellular component	cytoplasm; male germ cell nucleus; Golgi apparatus; motile cilium; cytoskeleton; nucleus; protein-containing complex
Biological process	cytoskeleton organization
Sources:Amigo / QuickGO
Orthologs
Databases	NCBI: entry; OMA: entry
Species	Human	Mouse
Entrez	10881	11470
Ensembl	ENSG00000187003	ENSMUSG00000070979
UniProt	Q9Y615	Q9QY84
RefSeq (mRNA)	NM_006687	NM_009611
RefSeq (protein)	NP_006678	NP_033741
Location (UCSC)	Chr 9: 108.86 – 108.86 Mb	Chr 4: 56.74 – 56.74 Mb
PubMed search
- Wikidata
View/Edit Human	View/Edit Mouse

Actin-like protein 7A is a protein that in humans is encoded by the ACTL7A gene.

The protein encoded by this gene is a member of a family of actin-related proteins (ARPs) which share significant amino acid sequence identity to conventional actins. Both actins and ARPs have an actin fold, which is an ATP-binding cleft, as a common feature. The ARPs are involved in diverse cellular processes, including vesicular transport, spindle orientation, nuclear migration and chromatin remodeling. This gene (ACTL7A), and related gene, ACTL7B, are intronless, and are located approximately 4 kb apart in a head-to-head orientation within the familial dysautonomia candidate region on 9q31. Based on mutational analysis of the ACTL7A gene in patients with this disorder, it was concluded that it is unlikely to be involved in the pathogenesis of dysautonomia. The ACTL7A gene is expressed in a wide variety of adult tissues, however, its exact function is not known.
