= VAT1 =

Protein-coding gene in the species Homo sapiens

Identifiers
- Aliases: VAT1, VATI, vesicle amine transport 1
- External IDs: OMIM: 604631; MGI: 1349450; HomoloGene: 36200; GeneCards: VAT1; OMA:VAT1 - orthologs

Gene location (Human)
| Chr. | Chromosome 17 (human) |
| Band | 17q21.31 | Start | 43,014,607 bp |
| Band | 17q21.31 | End | 43,025,123 bp |

Gene location (Mouse)
| Chr. | Chromosome 11 (mouse) |
| Band | 11|11 D | Start | 101,349,571 bp |
| Band | 11|11 D | End | 101,357,056 bp |
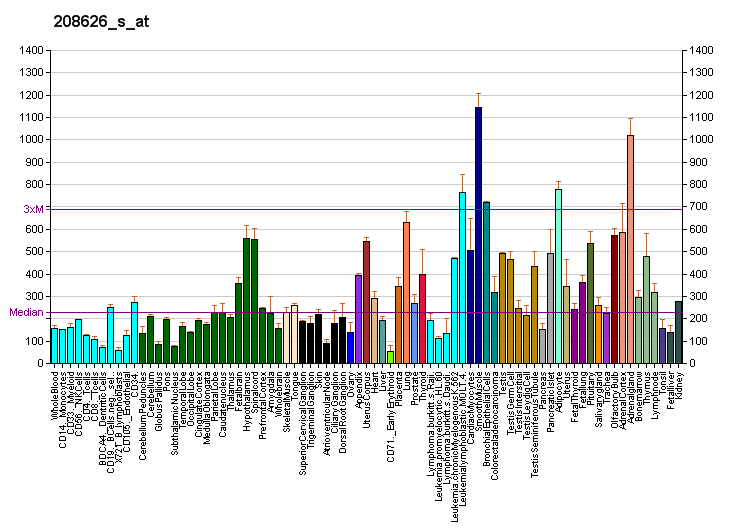
RNA expression pattern
| Bgee | Human / Mouse (ortholog); Top expressed in: right adrenal cortex; stromal cell of endometrium; left adrenal cortex; skin of leg; tendon of biceps brachii; canal of the cervix; right lung; islet of Langerhans; left ovary; right ovary / Top expressed in: lip; dorsomedial hypothalamic nucleus; ciliary body; decidua; aortic valve; otic vesicle; suprachiasmatic nucleus; supraoptic nucleus; gastrula; ascending aorta; More reference expression data |
| BioGPS | More reference expression data |
Gene ontology
| Molecular function | oxidoreductase activity; zinc ion binding |
| Cellular component | cytoplasm; integral component of membrane; mitochondrial outer membrane; extracellular exosome; membrane; mitochondrion; extracellular region; azurophil granule lumen |
| Biological process | negative regulation of mitochondrial fusion; neutrophil degranulation |
Sources:Amigo / QuickGO
Orthologs
| Species | Human | Mouse |
| Entrez | 10493 | 26949 |
| Ensembl | ENSG00000108828 | ENSMUSG00000034993 |
| UniProt | Q99536 | Q62465 |
| RefSeq (mRNA) | NM_006373 | NM_012037 |
| RefSeq (protein) | NP_006364; NP_006364.2 | NP_036167 |
| Location (UCSC) | Chr 17: 43.01 – 43.03 Mb | Chr 11: 101.35 – 101.36 Mb |
| PubMed search |
- Wikidata
| View/Edit Human | View/Edit Mouse |

Synaptic vesicle membrane protein VAT-1 homolog is a protein that in humans is encoded by the VAT1 gene.

Synaptic vesicles are responsible for regulating the storage and release of neurotransmitters in the nerve terminal. The protein encoded by this gene is an abundant integral membrane protein of cholinergic synaptic vesicles and is thought to be involved in vesicular transport. It belongs to the quinone oxidoreductase subfamily of zinc-containing alcohol dehydrogenase proteins.

In melanocytic cells VAT1 gene expression may be regulated by MITF.

== See also ==
- Acetylcholine, the neurotransmitter in cholinergic synaptic vesicles
