= C-terminus =

Type of an amino acid chain end

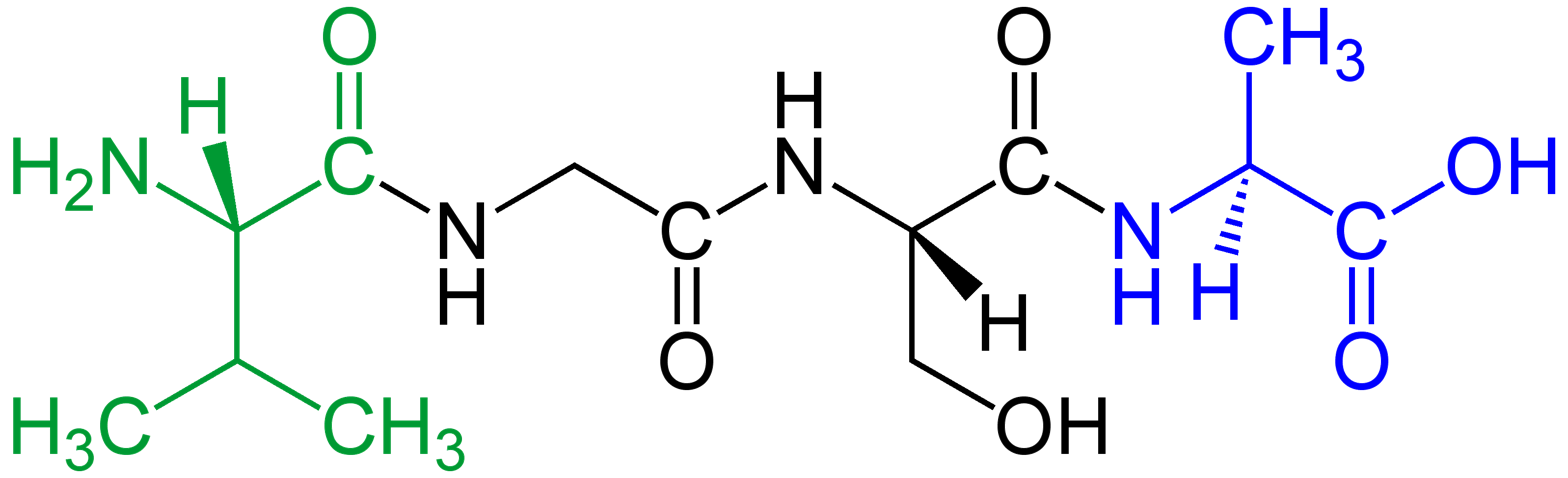
A tetrapeptide (example: Val-Gly-Ser-Ala) with green highlighted N-terminal α-amino acid (example: L-valine) and blue marked C-terminal α-amino acid (example: L-alanine).

The C-terminus (also known as the carboxyl-terminus, carboxy-terminus, C-terminal tail, carboxy tail, C-terminal end, or COOH-terminus) is the end of an amino acid chain (protein or polypeptide), terminated by a free carboxyl group (-COOH). When the protein is translated from messenger RNA, it is created from N-terminus to C-terminus. The convention for writing peptide sequences is to put the C-terminal end on the right and write the sequence from N- to C-terminus.

== Chemistry ==
Each amino acid has a carboxyl group and an amine group. Amino acids link to one another to form a chain by a dehydration reaction which joins the amine group of one amino acid to the carboxyl group of the next. Thus polypeptide chains have an end with an unbound carboxyl group, the C-terminus, and an end with an unbound amine group, the N-terminus. Proteins are naturally synthesized starting from the N-terminus and ending at the C-terminus.

== Function ==
=== C-terminal retention signals ===
While the N-terminus of a protein often contains targeting signals, the C-terminus can contain retention signals for protein sorting. The most common ER retention signal is the amino acid sequence -KDEL (Lys-Asp-Glu-Leu) or -HDEL (His-Asp-Glu-Leu) at the C-terminus. This keeps the protein in the endoplasmic reticulum and prevents it from entering the secretory pathway.

=== Peroxisomal targeting signal ===
The sequence -SKL (Ser-Lys-Leu) or similar near C-terminus serves as peroxisomal targeting signal 1, directing the protein into peroxisome.

=== C-terminal modifications ===
The C-terminus of proteins can be modified posttranslationally, most commonly by the addition of a lipid anchor to the C-terminus that allows the protein to be inserted into a membrane without having a transmembrane domain.

==== Prenylation ====
One form of C-terminal modification is prenylation. During prenylation, a farnesyl- or geranylgeranyl-isoprenoid membrane anchor is added to a cysteine residue near the C-terminus. Small, membrane-bound G proteins are often modified this way.

==== GPI anchors ====
Another form of C-terminal modification is the addition of a phosphoglycan, glycosylphosphatidylinositol (GPI), as a membrane anchor. The GPI anchor is attached to the C-terminus after proteolytic cleavage of a C-terminal propeptide. The most prominent example for this type of modification is the prion protein.

==== Methylation ====
C-terminal leucine is methylated at carboxyl group by enzyme leucine carboxyl methyltransferase 1 in vertebrates, forming methyl ester.

=== C-terminal domain ===
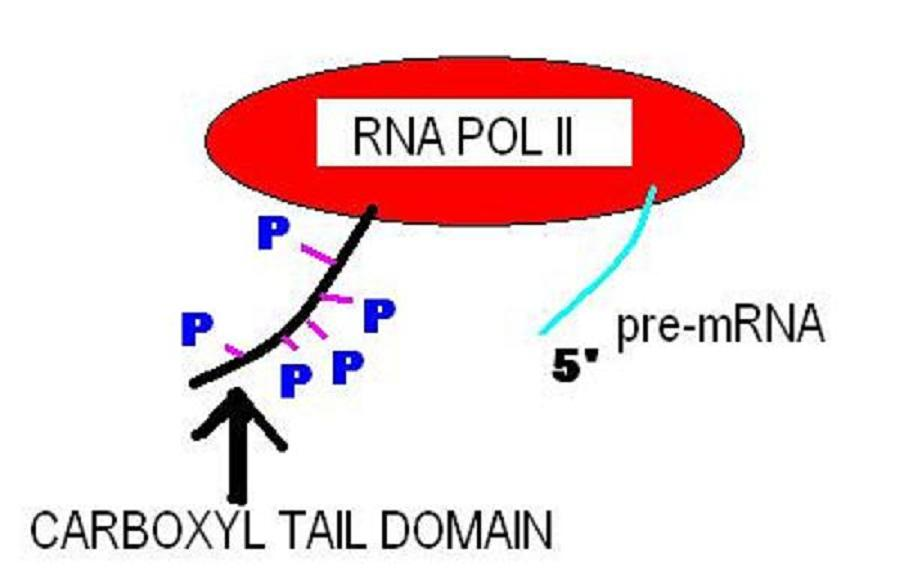
RNA POL II in action.

The C-terminal domain of some proteins has specialized functions. In humans, the CTD of RNA polymerase II typically consists of up to 52 repeats of the sequence Tyr-Ser-Pro-Thr-Ser-Pro-Ser. This allows other proteins to bind to the C-terminal domain of RNA polymerase in order to activate polymerase activity. These domains are then involved in the initiation of DNA transcription, the capping of the RNA transcript, and attachment to the spliceosome for RNA splicing.

== See also ==
- N-terminus
- TopFIND, a scientific database covering proteases, their cleavage site specificity, substrates, inhibitors and protein termini originating from their activity
