= COPI =

Protein complex

Identifiers
- Symbol: COPI_C
- Pfam: PF06957
- InterPro: IPR010714
Available protein structures:
- PDB: IPR010714 PF06957 (ECOD; PDBsum)
- AlphaFold: IPR010714; PF06957

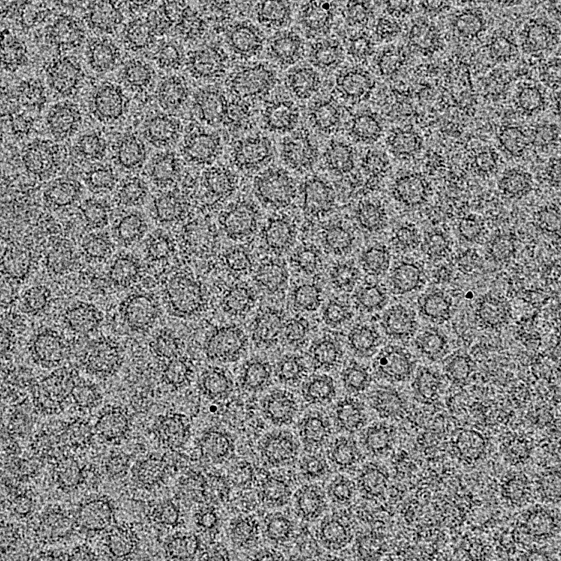
Electron micrograph of in vitro–formed COPI-coated vesicles. Average vesicle diameter at the membrane level is 60 nm.

COPI is a coatomer, a protein complex that coats vesicles transporting proteins from the cis end of the Golgi complex back to the rough endoplasmic reticulum (ER), where they were originally synthesized, and between Golgi compartments. This type of transport is retrograde transport, in contrast to the anterograde transport associated with the COPII protein. The name "COPI" refers to the specific coat protein complex that initiates the budding process on the cis-Golgi membrane. The coat consists of large protein subcomplexes that are made of seven different protein subunits, namely α, β, β', γ, δ, ε and ζ.

== Coat proteins ==
Coat protein, or COPI, is an ADP ribosylation factor (ARF)-dependent protein involved in membrane traffic. COPI was first identified in retrograde traffic from the cis-Golgi to the rough endoplasmic reticulum (ER) and is the most extensively studied of ARF-dependent adaptors. COPI consists of seven subunits which compose the heteroheptameric protein complex.

The primary function of adaptors is the selection of cargo proteins for their incorporation into nascent carriers. Cargo containing the sorting motifs KKXX and KXKXX interact with COPI to form carriers which are transported from the cis-Golgi to the ER. Current views suggest that ARFs are also involved in the selection of cargo for incorporation into carriers.

== Budding process ==
ADP ribosylation factor (ARF) is a GTPase involved in membrane traffic. There are 6 mammalian ARFs which are regulated by over 30 guanine nucleotide exchange factors (GEFs) and GTPase activating proteins (GAPs). ARF is post-translationally modified at the N-terminus by the addition of the fatty acid myristate.

ARF cycles between GTP and GDP-bound conformations. In the GTP-bound form, ARF conformation changes such that the myristate and hydrophobic N-terminal become more exposed and associate with the membrane. The interconversion between GTP and GDP bound states is mediated by ARF GEFs and ARF GAPs. At the membrane, ARF-GTP is hydrolyzed to ARF-GDP by ARF GAPs. Once in the GDP-bound conformation, ARF converts to a less hydrophobic conformation and dissociates from the membrane. Soluble ARF-GDP is converted back to ARF-GTP by GEFs.

1. Luminal proteins: Proteins found in the lumen of the Golgi complex that need to be transported to the lumen of the ER contain the signal peptide KDEL. This sequence is recognized by a membrane-bound KDEL receptor. In yeast, this is ERD2P and in mammals it is KDELR. This receptor then binds to an ARF-GEF, a class of guanine nucleotide exchange factors. This protein in turn binds to the ARF. This interaction causes ARF to exchange its bound GDP for GTP. Once this exchange is made ARF binds to the cytosolic side of the cis-Golgi membrane and inserts the myristoylated N-terminal amphipathic alpha-helix into the membrane.
2. Membrane proteins: Transmembrane proteins which reside in the ER contain sorting signals in their cytosolic tails which direct the protein to exit the Golgi and return to the ER. These sorting signals, or motifs, typically contain the amino acid sequence KKXX or KXKXX, which interact with COPI subunits α-COP and β'-COP. The order in which adaptor proteins associate with cargo, or adaptor proteins associate with ARFs is unclear, however, in order to form a mature transport carrier coat protein, adaptor, cargo, and ARF must all associate.

Membrane deformation and carrier budding occurs following the collection of interactions described above. The carrier then buds off of the donor membrane, in the case of COPI this membrane is the cis-Golgi, and the carrier moves to the ER where it fuses with the acceptor membrane and its content is expelled.

== Structure ==
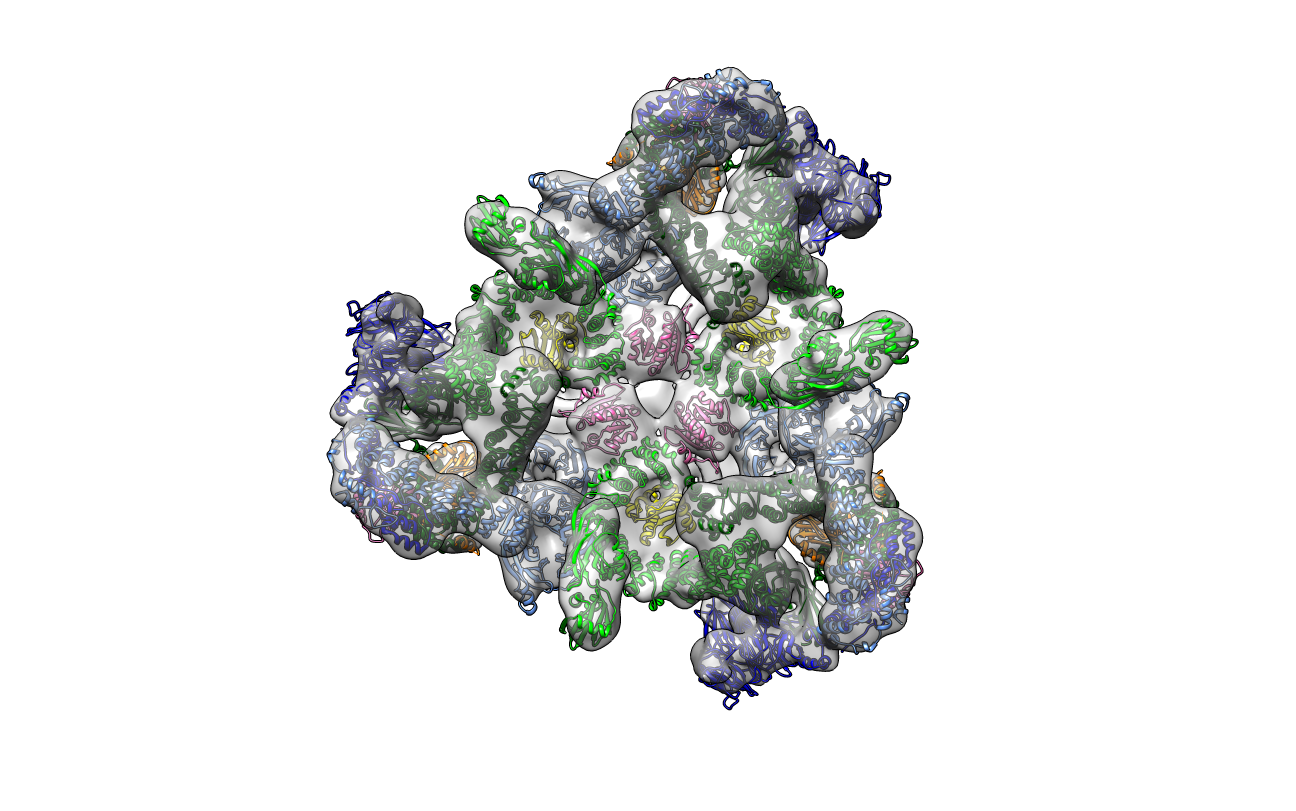
The COPI triad. Color scheme: membrane - gray; Arf1 - pink; gamma-COP - light green; beta-COP, dark green; zeta-COP - yellow; delta-COP - orange; betaprime-COP - light blue; alpha-COP - dark blue

On the surface of a vesicle COPI molecules form symmetric trimers ("triads"). The curved triad structure positions the Arf1 molecules and cargo binding sites proximal to the membrane. The β′- and α-COP subunits form an arch over the γζβδ-COP subcomplex, orienting their N-terminal domains such that the K(X)KXX cargo-motif binding sites are optimally positioned against the membrane. Thus β′- and α-COP do not form a cage or lattice as in COPII and clathrin coats as previously suggested; instead, they are linked to one another via the γζβδ-COP subcomplexes, forming an interconnected assembly. The triads are linked together with contacts of variable valence making up four different types of contacts.

== See also ==
- Clathrin-coated vesicles
- ER-to-Golgi transport
- Exomer
