= KKXX (amino acid sequence) =

Sequence in the structure of a protein

KKXX and for some proteins XKXX is a target peptide motif located in the C terminus in the amino acid structure of a protein responsible for retrieval of endoplasmic reticulum (ER) membrane proteins to and from the Golgi apparatus. These ER membrane proteins are transmembrane proteins that are then embedded into the ER membrane after transport from the Golgi. This motif is exclusively cytoplasmic and interacts with the COPI protein complex to target the ER from the cis end of the Golgi apparatus by retrograde transport.

The abbreviation KKXX is formed by the corresponding standard abbreviations for lysine (K) and any amino acid (X). This letter system was defined by the IUPAC and IUBMB in 1983, and is as follows:

- K—Lysine
- K—Lysine
- X— any amino acid
- X— any amino acid

== See also ==
- ER retention
- KDEL (amino acid sequence)
- COPI
- Signal peptide
- Protein targeting
