= Archain =

Chemical compound

archain 1

Identifiers
- Symbol: ARCN1
- Alt. symbols: COPD
- NCBI gene: 372
- HGNC: 649
- OMIM: 600820
- RefSeq: NM_001655
- UniProt: P48444

Other data
- Locus: Chr. 11 q23.3
Search for
- Structures: Swiss-model
- Domains: InterPro

Archain, also called Coatomer subunit delta is a human protein that is encoded by the ARCN1 gene, also called COPD which is located on chromosome 11.

Archain is part of the COPI coatomer complex.
