= Rav, Kutch =

Village in Gujarat, India

Coordinates: 23.666847°N 70.569359°E

Rav is a village of three hamlets; Rav Moti, Rav Nani and Temple; in an open plain, located nineteen miles from Chobari, in Rapar Taluka of Kutch district of Gujarat, India.

== Ravechi Mata temple ==
There is a temple dedicated to Ravechi Mata on the bank of a large pond, built in 1821 (Samvat 1878) at a cost of £633 (24,000 Kutch koris). The temple is 30 feet long 17 broad and 54 high with two domed porches, the first 7 feet square and the second 14 feet by 7, and a shrine 14 feet by 13 raised on a platform 44 feet high. In the shrine, smeared with red paint and butter and with five other images at her side, is a large statue of Ravechi Mata and opposite it Naklank or the Horse incarnation standing on three legs on a pillar. The goddess is highly venerated by the people of Vagad region of Kutch. Out of the temple income about 500 cows are maintained, and travelers are fed daily with milk, curds, and bread. The old temple, a range of finely carved nine-domed shrines with porches built by the Pandavas, is said to have been destroyed by the troops of one of the Babi chiefs. At the corner of the courtyard wall is a memorial stone with an inscription dated 1271 (Samvat 1328).
