= KDEL (amino acid sequence) =

Target peptide sequence

KDEL is a target peptide sequence motif in mammals and plants located on the C-terminal end of the amino acid structure of a protein. The KDEL sequence prevents a protein from being secreted from the endoplasmic reticulum (ER) and facilitates its return if it is accidentally exported.

A protein with a functional KDEL motif will be retrieved from the Golgi apparatus by retrograde transport to the ER lumen. It also targets proteins from other locations (such as the cytoplasm) to the ER. Proteins can only leave the ER after this sequence has been cleaved off.

The abbreviation KDEL is formed by the corresponding letters to each amino acid. This letter system was defined by the IUPAC and IUBMB in 1983, and is as follows:

- K—Lysine
- D—Aspartic acid
- E—Glutamic acid
- L—Leucine

Therefore, the KDEL sequence in three letter code is: Lys-Asp-Glu-Leu.

The soluble resident protein will remain in the ER as long as it contains a KDEL signal sequence on the C-terminal end of the protein. However, since vesicle budding is such a dynamic process, and there is a high concentration of soluble proteins in the ER, soluble proteins are inadvertently transported to the cis-golgi via COPII coated vesicles. The transportation mechanism of proteins containing the KDEL signal sequence is facilitated by KDEL receptors attached to COPII and COPI vesicles.

== KDEL receptors ==
Above is a video of HeLa cells that were treated with 160μg/ml of eGFP-RTA. Video starts 30-minutes after toxin treatment, 45 frames/hour.

KDEL receptors initiate the mechanism by which proteins are transported from the Golgi to the ER. These proteins were originally from the ER and they escaped into the cis-Golgi. The KDEL signal sequence is recognized by KDEL receptors, which are commonly located in the cis-Golgi, lysosomes, and secretory vesicles. These receptors are recycled during each transport cycle. KDEL receptor binding is dependent on pH, in which the ligand (target protein) binds strongly to the receptor in the cis-Golgi due to the unique low pH (6, in in vitro experiments pH 5 shows strongest binding) characteristic of the biochemical environment of the cis-Golgi network. As the vesicle that contains the KDEL receptor reaches the ER, the receptor is inactive due to the high pH (7.2-7.4) of the ER, resulting in the release of the target protein/ligand.

A study conducted by Becker et al. demonstrated through experimentation and simulation that KDEL receptors/cargo clustering at the cell surface is caused by the transport of cargo-synchronized receptors from and to the plasma membrane. The video on the right demonstrates an experiment conducted by Becker et al. demonstrating the dynamics of the KDEL receptor clustering's time dependence with a full experiment from start to finish (60 minutes). Within the paper, the authors note the importance of understanding the mechanism of action of the receptor clustering and dynamic reorganization because of its potential understanding to use for designing targeted therapeutics.

== Equivalent in yeasts and plants ==
The similar sequence HDEL performs the same function in yeasts, while plants are known to utilize both KDEL and HDEL signaling sequences.

The abbreviation HDEL follows the same notation as KDEL:

- H—Histidine
- D—Aspartic acid
- E—Glutamic acid
- L—Leucine

Three letter code is: His-Asp-Glu-Leu.

== See also ==
- ER retention
- KKXX (amino acid sequence)
- Endoplasmic reticulum protein retention receptors
  - KDELR1
  - KDELR2
  - KDELR3
