= ARFGAP1 =

Protein-coding gene in the species Homo sapiens

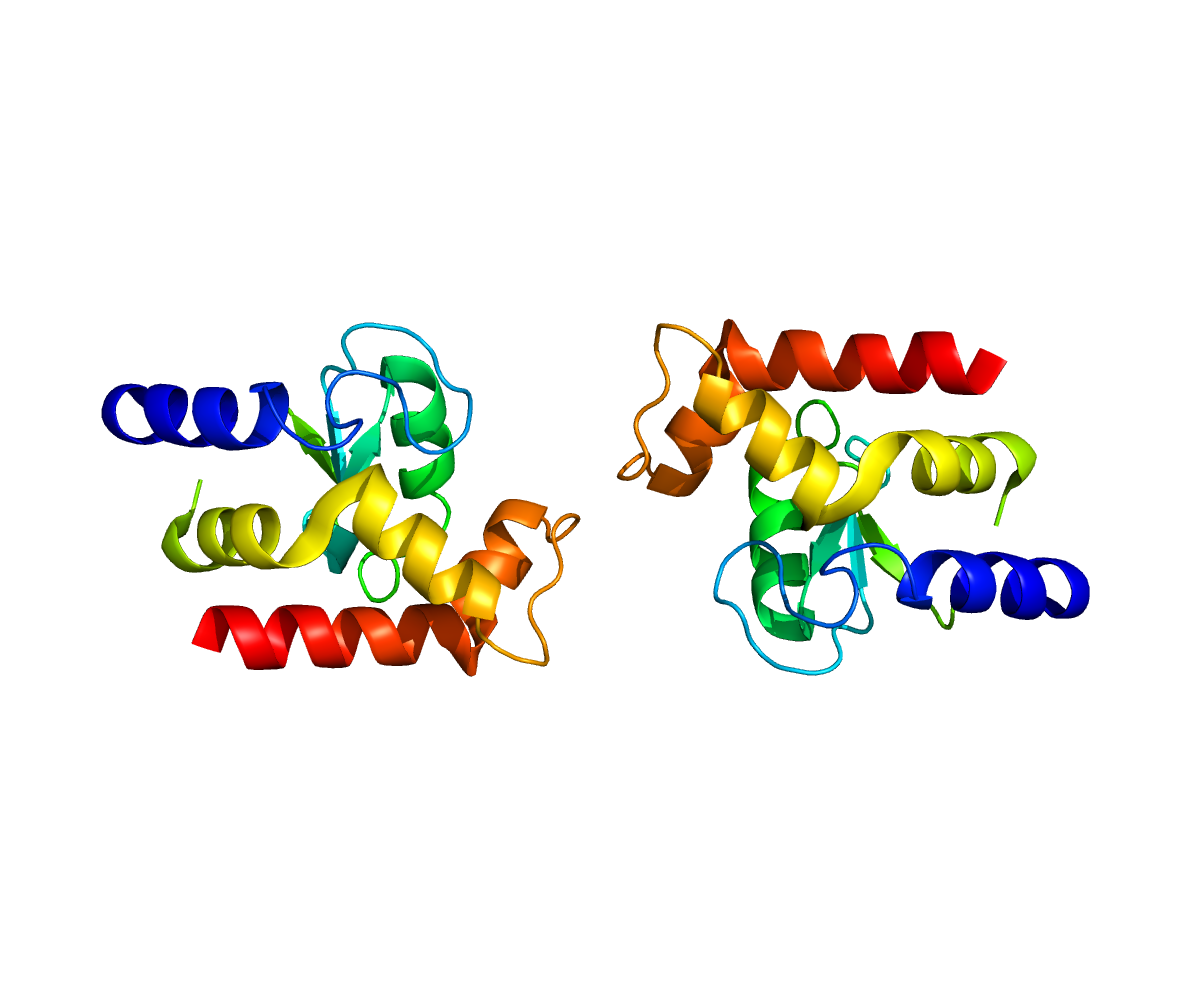

Identifiers
- Aliases: ARFGAP1, ARF1GAP, HRIHFB2281, ADP ribosylation factor GTPase activating protein 1
- External IDs: OMIM: 608377; MGI: 2183559; GeneCards: ARFGAP1
Available structures
PDB	Ortholog search: PDBe RCSB
PDB	List of PDB id codes 3O47, 3DWD

Gene location (Human)
Chr.	Chromosome 20 (human)
Band	20q13.33	Start	63,272,785 bp
Band	20q13.33	End	63,289,790 bp

Gene location (Mouse)
Chr.	Chromosome 2 (mouse)
Band	2 H4|2 103.53 cM	Start	180,609,018 bp
Band	2 H4|2 103.53 cM	End	180,624,319 bp
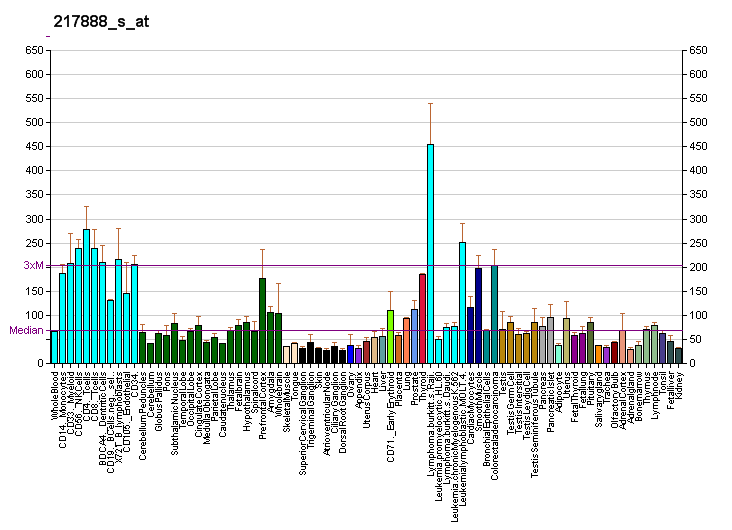
RNA expression pattern
Bgee	Human / Mouse (ortholog); Top expressed in: anterior pituitary; gastric mucosa; stromal cell of endometrium; right hemisphere of cerebellum; right uterine tube; right lobe of thyroid gland; body of uterus; canal of the cervix; left lobe of thyroid gland; right ovary / Top expressed in: fossa; internal carotid artery; condyle; external carotid artery; dentate gyrus of hippocampal formation granule cell; primary visual cortex; superior frontal gyrus; neural layer of retina; otic vesicle; gastrula; More reference expression data
BioGPS	More reference expression data
Gene ontology
Molecular function	metal ion binding; GTPase activator activity; protein binding
Cellular component	cytoplasm; synapse; Golgi apparatus; cytosol; postsynaptic density; Golgi membrane
Biological process	endoplasmic reticulum to Golgi vesicle-mediated transport; regulation of endocytosis; IRE1-mediated unfolded protein response; retrograde vesicle-mediated transport, Golgi to endoplasmic reticulum; protein transport; vesicle-mediated transport; positive regulation of GTPase activity; regulation of ARF protein signal transduction
Sources:Amigo / QuickGO
Orthologs
Databases	NCBI: entry; OMA: entry
Species	Human	Mouse
Entrez	55738	228998
Ensembl	ENSG00000101199	ENSMUSG00000027575
UniProt	Q8N6T3	Q9EPJ9
RefSeq (mRNA)	NM_001281482; NM_001281483; NM_001281484; NM_018209; NM_175609	NM_001177706; NM_001177707; NM_001177708; NM_001177709; NM_001177710 NM_145760; NM_001363035; NM_001363036; NM_001363037; NM_001374670
RefSeq (protein)	NP_001268411; NP_001268412; NP_001268413; NP_060679; NP_783202	NP_001171177; NP_001171178; NP_001171179; NP_001171180; NP_001171181 NP_665703; NP_001349964; NP_001349965; NP_001349966; NP_001361599
Location (UCSC)	Chr 20: 63.27 – 63.29 Mb	Chr 2: 180.61 – 180.62 Mb
PubMed search
- Wikidata
View/Edit Human	View/Edit Mouse

ADP-ribosylation factor GTPase-activating protein 1 is an enzyme that in humans is encoded by the ARFGAP1 gene. Two transcript variants encoding different isoforms have been found for this gene.

== Function ==
The protein encoded by this gene is a GTPase-activating protein (GAP) which associates with the Golgi apparatus and which interacts with ADP-ribosylation factor 1 (ARF1). The encoded protein promotes hydrolysis of ARF1-bound GTP and is required for the dissociation of coat proteins from Golgi-derived membranes and vesicles. Dissociation of the coat proteins is required for the fusion of these vesicles with target compartments. The activity of this protein is stimulated by phosphoinositides and inhibited by phosphatidylcholine.

The protein has two amphipathic lipid packing sensor motifs (ALPS), that let the protein sense the curvature of the membrane (<30 nm) or lipid packing defects, and in this way evaluate if the vesicle is mature and ready for coat disassembly.

== Interactions ==
ARFGAP1 has been shown to interact with KDELR1 and LRRK2.
