= Ribosome-associated vesicle =

Newly discovered cellular organelle

Ribosome-associated vesicles (RAVs), are novel sub-compartments of the rough endoplasmic reticulum, a membranous cellular network that is important for the synthesis and transport of proteins. RAVs have been observed via multiple imaging techniques and appear as discrete spherical vesicles that are associated with actively translated ribosomes. It is hypothesized that RAVs may arise from structural and/or functional changes in local membrane curvature along the rough endoplasmic reticulum's tubular membrane network.

== Discovery ==
RAVs were first identified in the pancreatic β-cell-derived INS-1E cells of rats, using a combination of live-cell super-resolution stimulated-emission-depletion microscopy (STED) and highly-inclined thin illumination (HiLO), with high-speed, three-dimensional (3D) wide-field imaging. This approach was integrated with in situ cryo-electron tomography (Cryo-ET) and cryo-correlative light and electron microscopy (Cryo-CLEM) to visualize ER network dynamics, including relationships with other intracellular organelles, including mitochondria.

== Characteristics ==
Classically, ER tubules tend to be highly curved and free of ribosomes, whereas ER sheets lack curvature but have ribosomes. In contrast, RAVs are formed from highly curved structures with ribosomes. RAVs are also known to be dynamic, moving throughout the cell over distances as long as 5 μm. These vesicular structures are primarily found in the cell periphery near microtubule tracks and the ER reticular network. Furthermore, RAVs and ER interact closely via direct contacts.

RAVs have been characterized in multiple cell types across different organs. This includes primary human fibroblasts, mouse embryonic fibroblasts, and human BE(2)-M17 cells, a dopamine-secreting, neuron-derived cell line. Carter, et al., were able to apply their findings to primary rat cortical neurons, as well. Similar to pancreatic cells, neuronal RAVs are also highly dynamic and show movement along the length of dendrites. Live imaging studies show RAVs in both neurons and INS1-1E cells stalling at times, consistent with other dynamic intracellular structures that stall upon recruitment to sites of local translation.

== Proposed function ==
It is hypothesized that RAVs may represent a novel mechanism by which secretory cells can answer to the demanding workload of protein synthesis, due to the dynamic nature of RAVs. The hybrid morphology of the RAVs is thought to serve as a way for the secretory cells to harness the protein production of the rough ER combined with the mobility of the tubular smooth ER.

Studies have suggested that local translation may play a critical role in activity-dependent synaptic plasticity and neuron remodelling. While thousands of mRNAs are trafficked to dendrites for site-specific translation, the machinery for this translation has yet to be fully elucidated. Carter, et al., propose that RAVs may facilitate site-specific local translation in neurons by coupling cell activity and protein synthesis, consistent with other dynamic intracellular structures that stall upon recruitment to sites of local translation.
