= HDEL (amino acid sequence) =

HDEL is a target peptide sequence in plants and yeasts located on the C-terminal end of the amino acid structure of a protein. The HDEL sequence prevents a protein from being secreted from the endoplasmic reticulum (ER) and facilitates its return if it is accidentally exported.

The similar sequence KDEL performs the same function in animals, while plants are known to utilize both KDEL and HDEL signaling sequences.

The abbreviation HDEL is as follows.

- H—Histidine
- D—Aspartic acid
- E—Glutamic acid
- L—Leucine

Three letter code is: His-Asp-Glu-Leu.
