= KDELR2 =

Protein-coding gene in the species Homo sapiens

Identifiers
- Aliases: KDELR2, ELP-1, ERD2.2, KDEL endoplasmic reticulum protein retention receptor 2, OI21, ELP1
- External IDs: OMIM: 609024; MGI: 1914163; GeneCards: KDELR2

Gene location (Human)
Chr.	Chromosome 7 (human)
Band	7p22.1	Start	6,445,953 bp
Band	7p22.1	End	6,484,190 bp

Gene location (Mouse)
Chr.	Chromosome 5 (mouse)
Band	5|5 G2	Start	143,389,593 bp
Band	5|5 G2	End	143,407,656 bp
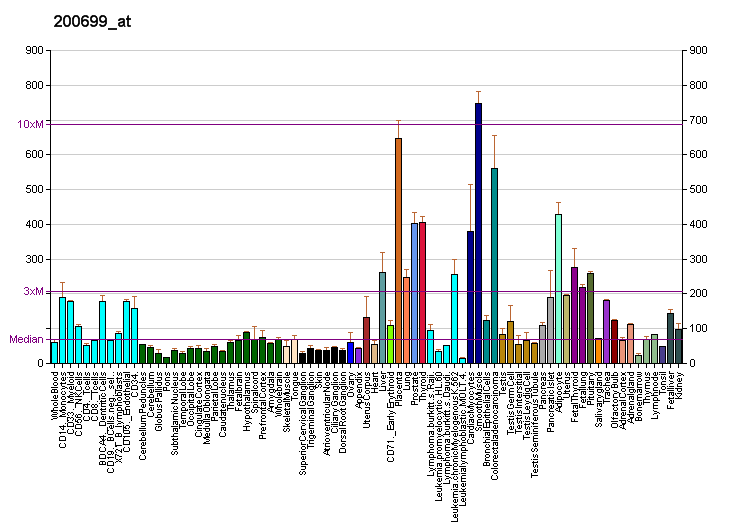

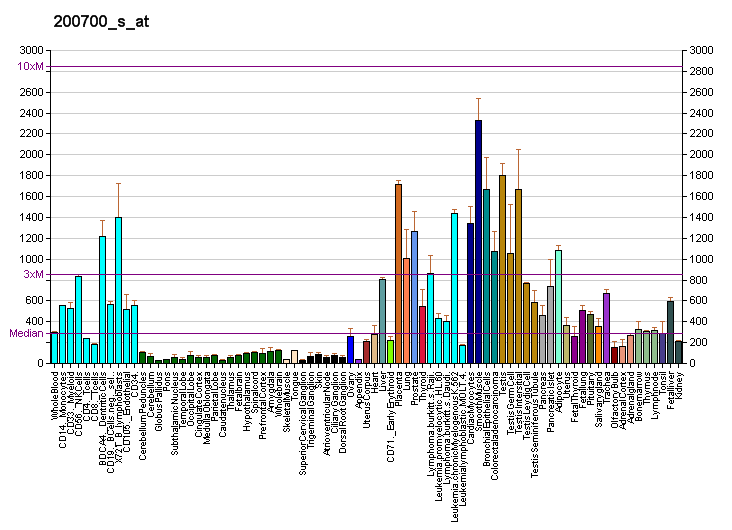

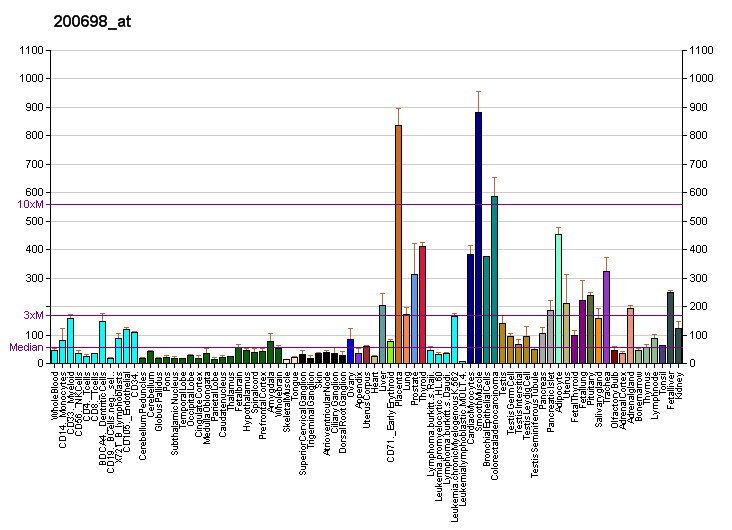
RNA expression pattern
Bgee	Human / Mouse (ortholog); Top expressed in: stromal cell of endometrium; tibia; mucosa of sigmoid colon; Achilles tendon; rectum; pylorus; smooth muscle tissue; cartilage tissue; jejunal mucosa; pericardium / Top expressed in: ascending aorta; aortic valve; umbilical cord; migratory enteric neural crest cell; molar; seminal vesicula; Gonadal ridge; vas deferens; gallbladder; gastrula; More reference expression data
BioGPS	More reference expression data
Gene ontology
Molecular function	KDEL sequence binding; ER retention sequence binding
Cellular component	integral component of membrane; cis-Golgi network; Golgi apparatus; endoplasmic reticulum; membrane; endoplasmic reticulum membrane; Golgi membrane; transport vesicle; COPI-coated vesicle membrane; cytoplasmic vesicle
Biological process	protein transport; protein retention in ER lumen; intracellular protein transport; vesicle-mediated transport; retrograde vesicle-mediated transport, Golgi to endoplasmic reticulum; endoplasmic reticulum to Golgi vesicle-mediated transport
Sources:Amigo / QuickGO
Orthologs
Databases	NCBI: entry; OMA: entry
Species	Human	Mouse
Entrez	11014	66913
Ensembl	ENSG00000136240	ENSMUSG00000079111
UniProt	P33947	Q9CQM2
RefSeq (mRNA)	NM_006854; NM_001100603	NM_025841
RefSeq (protein)	NP_001094073; NP_006845	NP_080117
Location (UCSC)	Chr 7: 6.45 – 6.48 Mb	Chr 5: 143.39 – 143.41 Mb
PubMed search
- Wikidata
View/Edit Human	View/Edit Mouse

ER lumen protein retaining receptor 2 is a protein that in humans is encoded by the KDELR2 gene.

Retention of resident soluble proteins in the lumen of the endoplasmic reticulum (ER) is achieved in both yeast and animal cells by their continual retrieval from the cis-Golgi, or a pre-Golgi compartment. Sorting of these proteins is dependent on a C-terminal tetrapeptide signal, lys-asp-glu-leu (KDEL) in animal cells and his-asp-glu-leu (HDEL) in S. cerevisiae. This process is mediated by a receptor that recognizes, and binds the tetrapeptide-containing protein, and returns it to the ER. In yeast, the sorting receptor encoded by a single gene, ERD2, is a seven-transmembrane protein. Unlike yeast, several human homologs of the ERD2 gene, constituting the KDEL receptor gene family, have been described. KDELR2 was the second member of the family to be identified, and it encodes a protein which is 83% identical to the KDELR1 gene product.

== Clinical significance ==
Pathogenic variants in KDELR2 have been linked to Osteogenesis imperfecta.

== See also ==
- KDELR1
- KDELR3
