= KDELR3 =

Protein-coding gene in the species Homo sapiens

Identifiers
- Aliases: KDELR3, ERD2L3, KDEL endoplasmic reticulum protein retention receptor 3
- External IDs: MGI: 2145953; GeneCards: KDELR3

Gene location (Human)
Chr.	Chromosome 22 (human)
Band	22q13.1	Start	38,468,078 bp
Band	22q13.1	End	38,483,447 bp

Gene location (Mouse)
Chr.	Chromosome 15 (mouse)
Band	15|15 E1	Start	79,400,612 bp
Band	15|15 E1	End	79,411,940 bp
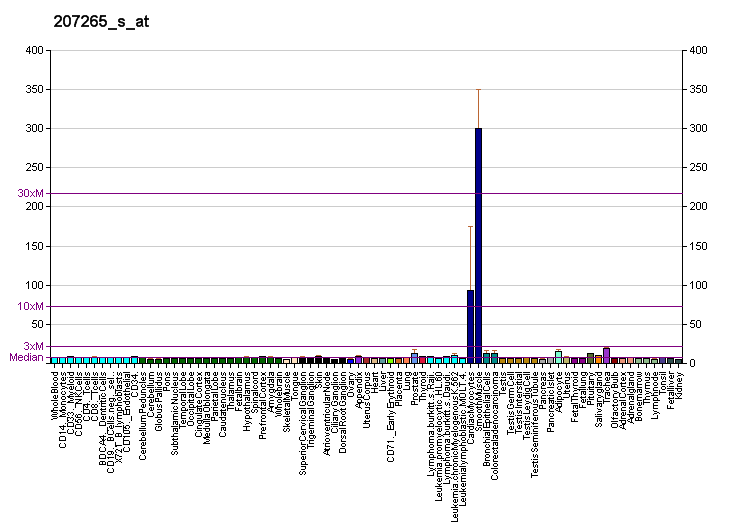

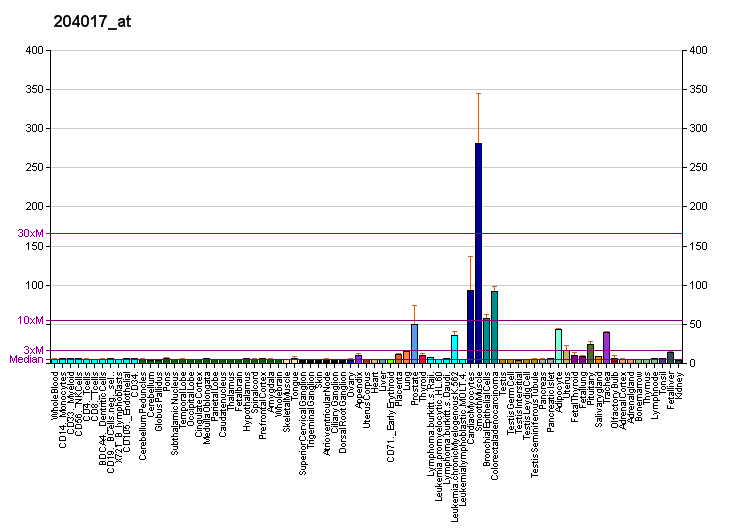
RNA expression pattern
Bgee	Human / Mouse (ortholog); Top expressed in: tibia; parotid gland; periodontal fiber; stromal cell of endometrium; pancreatic ductal cell; jejunal mucosa; skin of hip; mucosa of sigmoid colon; parietal pleura; germinal epithelium / Top expressed in: calvaria; efferent ductule; molar; body of femur; umbilical cord; dermis; ascending aorta; ankle joint; decidua; fossa; More reference expression data
BioGPS	More reference expression data
Gene ontology
Molecular function	ER retention sequence binding; KDEL sequence binding
Cellular component	integral component of membrane; endoplasmic reticulum membrane; membrane; transport vesicle; Golgi membrane; endoplasmic reticulum; Golgi apparatus; cis-Golgi network; COPI-coated vesicle membrane; cytoplasmic vesicle
Biological process	protein transport; protein retention in ER lumen; IRE1-mediated unfolded protein response; vesicle-mediated transport; retrograde vesicle-mediated transport, Golgi to endoplasmic reticulum; endoplasmic reticulum to Golgi vesicle-mediated transport
Sources:Amigo / QuickGO
Orthologs
Databases	NCBI: entry; OMA: entry
Species	Human	Mouse
Entrez	11015	105785
Ensembl	ENSG00000100196	ENSMUSG00000010830
UniProt	O43731	Q8R1L4
RefSeq (mRNA)	NM_016657; NM_006855	NM_134090
RefSeq (protein)	NP_006846; NP_057839	NP_598851
Location (UCSC)	Chr 22: 38.47 – 38.48 Mb	Chr 15: 79.4 – 79.41 Mb
PubMed search
- Wikidata
View/Edit Human	View/Edit Mouse

ER lumen protein retaining receptor 3 is a protein that in humans is encoded by the KDELR3 gene.

Retention of resident soluble proteins in the lumen of the endoplasmic reticulum (ER) is achieved in both yeast and animal cells by their continual retrieval from the cis-Golgi, or a pre-Golgi compartment. Sorting of these proteins is dependent on a C-terminal tetrapeptide signal, lys-asp-glu-leu (KDEL) in animal cells and his-asp-glu-leu (HDEL) in S. cerevisiae. This process is mediated by a receptor that recognizes, and binds the tetrapeptide-containing protein, and returns it to the ER. In yeast, the sorting receptor encoded by a single gene, ERD2, is a seven-transmembrane protein. Unlike yeast, several human homologs of the ERD2 gene, constituting the KDEL receptor gene family, have been described. KDELR3 was the third member of the family to be identified, and it encodes a protein highly homologous to KDELR1 and KDELR2 proteins. Two transcript variants of KDELR3 that arise by alternative splicing, and encode different isoforms of KDELR3 receptor, have been described.

== See also ==
- KDELR1
- KDELR2
