= Endoplasmic reticulum =

Cell organelle that processes proteins

Cell biology
- Animal cell diagram
- Components of a typical animal cell: 1. Nucleolus; 2. Nucleus; 3. Ribosome (dots as part of 5); 4. Vesicle; 5. Rough endoplasmic reticulum 6. Golgi apparatus (or, Golgi body); 7. Cytoskeleton; 8. Smooth endoplasmic reticulum 9. Mitochondrion; 10. Vacuole; 11. Cytosol (fluid that contains organelles; with which, comprises cytoplasm); 12. Lysosome; 13. Centrosome; 14. Cell membrane

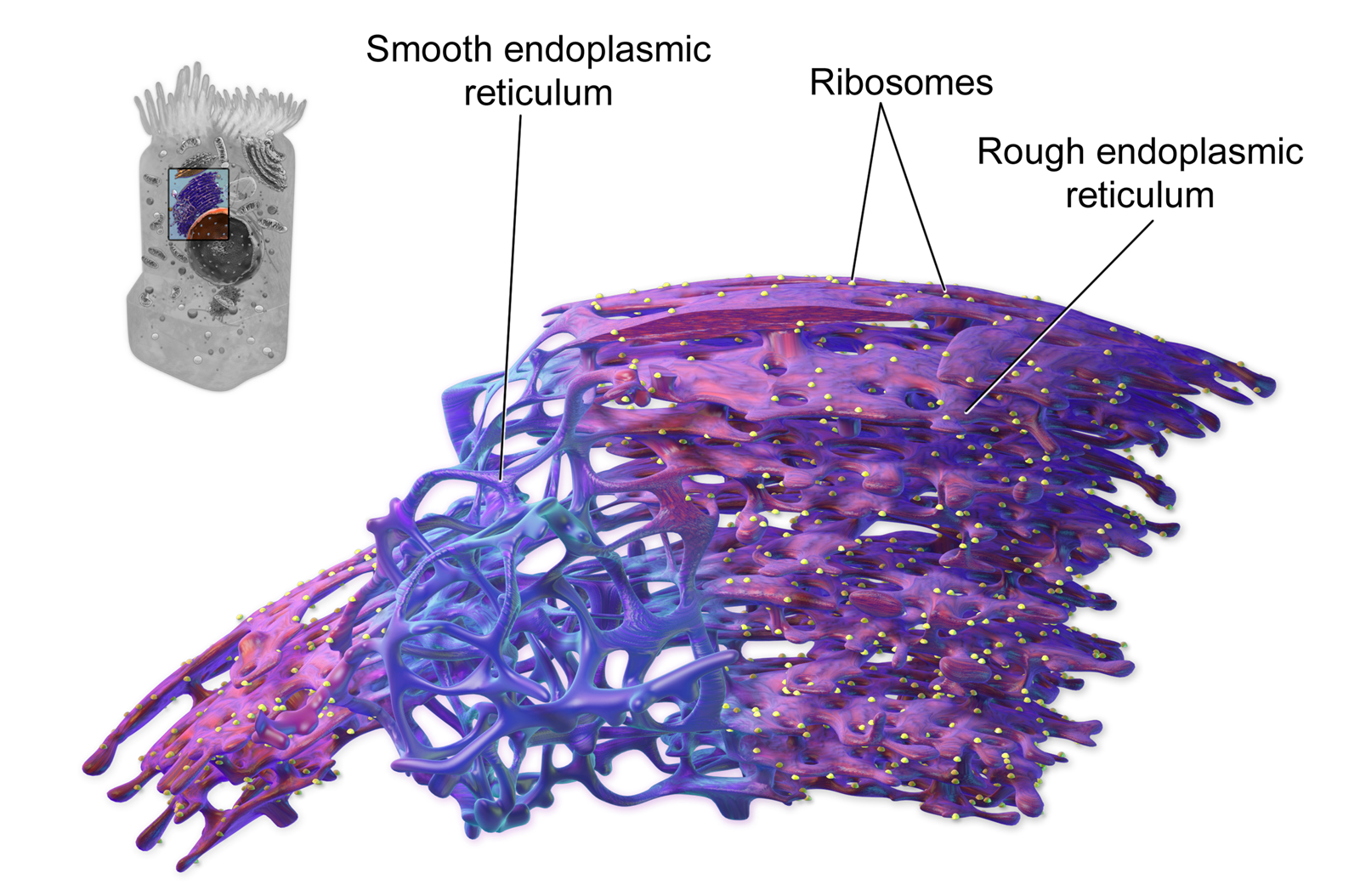
3D rendering of endoplasmic reticulum

The endoplasmic reticulum (ER) is a part of a transportation system of the eukaryotic cell, and has many other important functions such as protein folding. The word endoplasmic means "within the cytoplasm", and reticulum is Latin for "little net". It is a type of organelle made up of two subunits – rough endoplasmic reticulum (RER), and smooth endoplasmic reticulum (SER). The endoplasmic reticulum is found in most eukaryotic cells and forms an interconnected network of flattened, membrane-enclosed sacs known as cisternae in the RER, and tubular structures in the SER. The membranes of the ER are continuous with the outer nuclear membrane. The endoplasmic reticulum is not found in red blood cells, or spermatozoa.

There are two types of ER that share many of the same proteins and engage in certain common activities such as the synthesis of certain lipids and cholesterol. Different types of cells contain different ratios of the two types of ER depending on the activities of the cell. RER is found mainly toward the nucleus of the cell and SER towards the cell membrane or plasma membrane of the cell.

The outer (cytosolic) face of the RER is studded with ribosomes that are the sites of protein synthesis. The RER is especially prominent in cells such as hepatocytes. The SER lacks ribosomes and functions in lipid synthesis but not metabolism, the production of steroid hormones, and detoxification. The SER is especially abundant in mammalian liver and gonad cells.

The ER was observed by light microscopy by Charles Garnier in 1897, who coined the term ergastoplasm. The lacy membranes of the endoplasmic reticulum were first seen by electron microscopy in 1945 by Keith R. Porter, Albert Claude, and Ernest F. Fullam.

== Structure ==
1 Nucleus 2 Nuclear pore 3 Rough endoplasmic reticulum (RER) 4 Smooth endoplasmic reticulum (SER) 5 Ribosome on the rough ER 6 Proteins that are transported 7 Transport vesicle 8 Golgi apparatus 9 Cis face of the Golgi apparatus 10 Trans face of the Golgi apparatus 11 Cisternae of the Golgi apparatus

The general structure of the endoplasmic reticulum is a network of membranes called cisternae. These sac-like structures are held together by the cytoskeleton. The phospholipid membrane encloses the cisternal space (or lumen), which is continuous with the perinuclear space but separate from the cytosol. The functions of the endoplasmic reticulum can be summarized as the synthesis and export of proteins and membrane lipids, but varies between ER and cell type and cell function. The quantity of both rough and smooth endoplasmic reticulum in a cell can slowly interchange from one type to the other, depending on the changing metabolic activities of the cell. Transformation can include embedding of new proteins in membrane as well as structural changes. Changes in protein content may occur without noticeable structural changes.

=== Rough endoplasmic reticulum ===
A 2-minute animation showing how a protein destined for the secretory pathway is synthesized and secreted into the rough endoplasmic reticulum, which appears at the upper right approximately halfway through the animation

The surface of the rough endoplasmic reticulum (often abbreviated RER or rough ER; also called granular endoplasmic reticulum) is studded with protein-manufacturing ribosomes giving it a "rough" appearance (hence its name). The binding site of the ribosome on the rough endoplasmic reticulum is the translocon. However, the ribosomes are not a stable part of this organelle's structure as they are constantly being bound and released from the membrane. A ribosome only binds to the RER once a specific protein-nucleic acid complex forms in the cytosol. This special complex forms when a free ribosome begins translating the mRNA of a protein destined for the secretory pathway. The first 5–30 amino acids polymerized encode a signal peptide, a molecular message that is recognized and bound by a signal recognition particle (SRP). Translation pauses and the ribosome complex binds to the RER translocon where translation continues with the nascent (new) protein forming into the RER lumen and/or membrane. The protein is processed in the ER lumen by an enzyme (a signal peptidase), which removes the signal peptide. Ribosomes at this point may be released back into the cytosol; however, non-translating ribosomes are also known to stay associated with translocons.

The membrane of the rough endoplasmic reticulum is in the form of large double-membrane sheets that are located near, and continuous with, the outer layer of the nuclear envelope. The double membrane sheets are stacked and connected through several right- or left-handed helical ramps, the "Terasaki ramps", giving rise to a structure resembling a parking garage. Although there is no continuous membrane between the endoplasmic reticulum and the Golgi apparatus, membrane-bound transport vesicles shuttle proteins between these two compartments. Vesicles are surrounded by coating proteins called COPI and COPII. COPII targets vesicles to the Golgi apparatus and COPI marks them to be brought back to the rough endoplasmic reticulum. The rough endoplasmic reticulum works in concert with the Golgi complex to target new proteins to their proper destinations. The second method of transport out of the endoplasmic reticulum involves areas called membrane contact sites, where the membranes of the endoplasmic reticulum and other organelles are held closely together, allowing the transfer of lipids and other small molecules.

The rough endoplasmic reticulum is key in multiple functions:

- Manufacture of lysosomal enzymes with a mannose-6-phosphate marker added in the cis-Golgi network.
- Manufacture of secreted proteins, either secreted constitutively with no tag or secreted in a regulatory manner involving clathrin and paired basic amino acids in the signal peptide.
- Integral membrane proteins that stay embedded in the membrane as vesicles exit and bind to new membranes. Rab proteins are key in targeting the membrane; SNAP and SNARE proteins are key in the fusion event.
- Initial glycosylation as assembly continues. This is N-linked (O-linking occurs in the Golgi).
  - N-linked glycosylation: If the protein is properly folded, oligosaccharyltransferase recognizes the AA sequence NXS or NXT (with the S/T residue phosphorylated) and adds a 14-sugar backbone (2-N-acetylglucosamine, 9-branching mannose, and 3-glucose at the end) to the side-chain nitrogen of Asn.

The RER has ribosomes while the SER does not.

=== Smooth endoplasmic reticulum ===
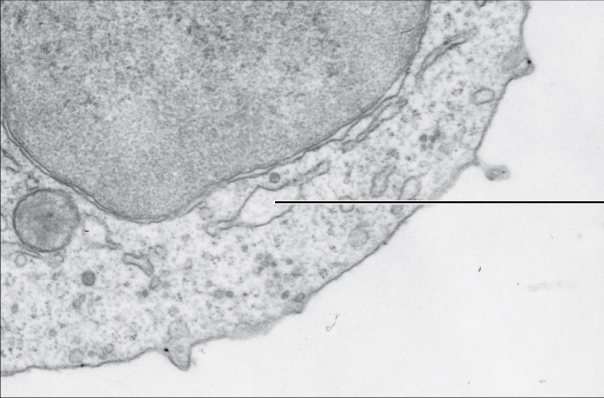
Electron micrograph showing smooth ER (arrow) in mouse tissue, at 110,510× magnification

In most cells the smooth endoplasmic reticulum (abbreviated SER) is scarce. Instead there are areas where the ER is partly smooth and partly rough: the transitional ER. The transitional ER gets its name because it contains ER exit sites, areas where the transport vesicles, which contain lipids and proteins made in the ER, detach from the ER and start moving to the Golgi apparatus. Specialized cells can have a lot of smooth endoplasmic reticulum and in these cells the smooth ER has many functions. It synthesizes lipids, phospholipids, and steroids. Cells which secrete these products, such as those in the testes, ovaries, and sebaceous glands, have an abundance of smooth endoplasmic reticulum. It also carries out the metabolism of carbohydrates, detoxification of natural metabolism products and of alcohol and drugs, attachment of receptors on cell membrane proteins, and steroid metabolism. In muscle cells, it regulates calcium ion concentration. Smooth endoplasmic reticulum is found in a variety of cell types (both animal and plant), and it serves different functions in each. The smooth endoplasmic reticulum also contains the enzyme glucose-6-phosphatase, which converts glucose-6-phosphate to glucose, a step in gluconeogenesis. It is connected to the nuclear envelope and consists of tubules that are located near the cell periphery. These tubes sometimes branch forming a network that is reticular in appearance. In some cells, there are dilated areas like the sacs of rough endoplasmic reticulum. The network of smooth endoplasmic reticulum allows for an increased surface area to be devoted to the action or storage of key enzymes and the products of these enzymes.

==== Sarcoplasmic reticulum ====
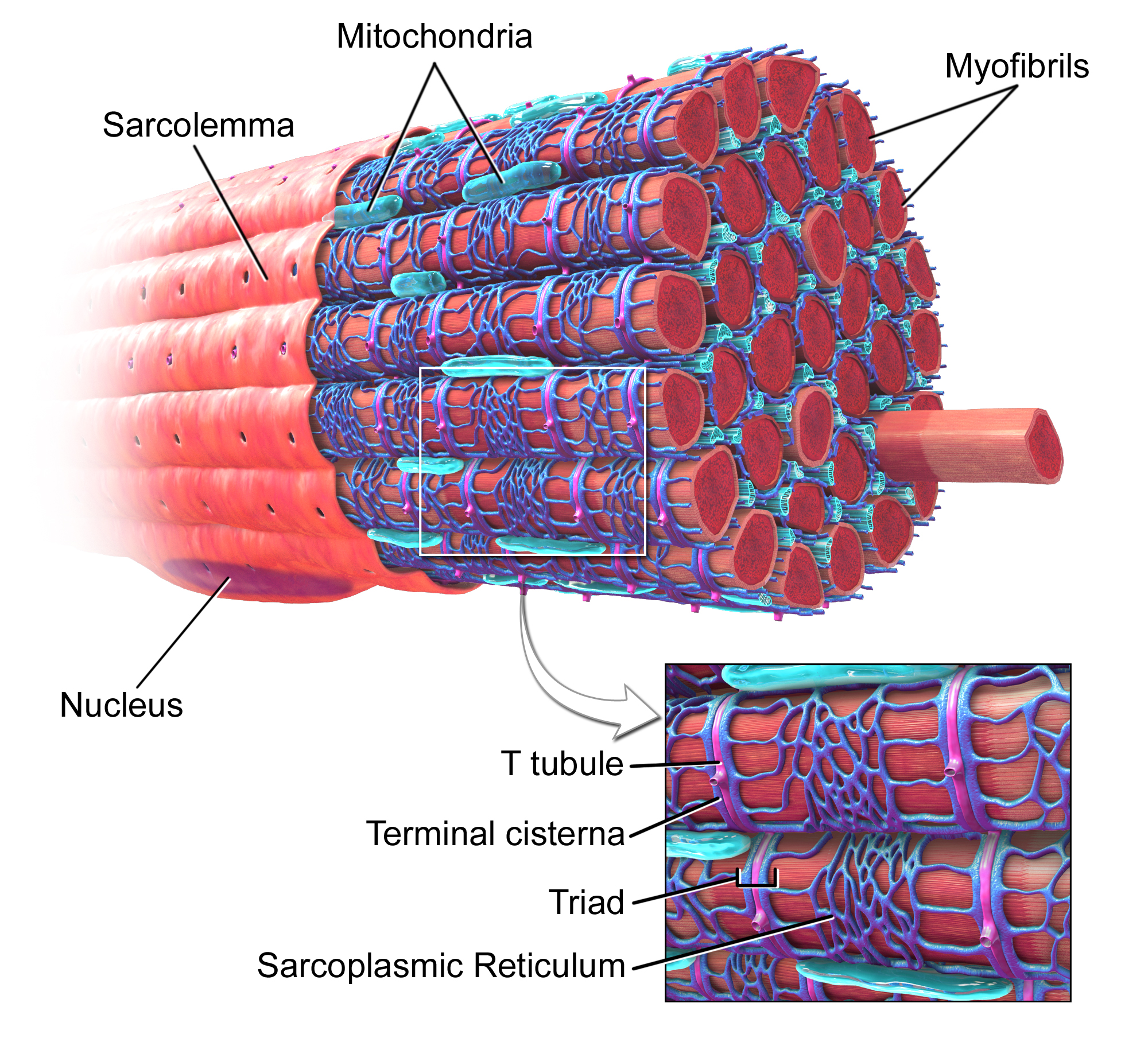
Skeletal muscle fiber, with sarcoplasmic reticulum colored in blue

The sarcoplasmic reticulum (SR), from the Greek σάρξ sarx ("flesh"), is smooth ER found in muscle cells. The only structural difference between this organelle and the smooth endoplasmic reticulum is the composition of proteins they have, both bound to their membranes and drifting within the confines of their lumens. This fundamental difference is indicative of their functions: The endoplasmic reticulum synthesizes molecules, while the sarcoplasmic reticulum stores calcium ions and pumps them out into the sarcoplasm when the muscle fiber is stimulated. After their release from the sarcoplasmic reticulum, calcium ions interact with contractile proteins that utilize ATP to shorten the muscle fiber. The sarcoplasmic reticulum plays a major role in excitation-contraction coupling.

== Functions ==
The endoplasmic reticulum serves many general functions, including the folding of protein molecules in sacs called cisternae and the transport of synthesized proteins in vesicles to the Golgi apparatus. Rough endoplasmic reticulum is also involved in protein synthesis. Correct folding of newly made proteins is made possible by several endoplasmic reticulum chaperone proteins, including protein disulfide isomerase (PDI), ERp29, the Hsp70 family member BiP/Grp78, calnexin, calreticulin, and the peptidylprolyl isomerase family. Only properly folded proteins are transported from the rough ER to the Golgi apparatus – unfolded proteins cause an unfolded protein response as a stress response in the ER. Disturbances in redox regulation, calcium regulation, glucose deprivation, and viral infection or the over-expression of proteins can lead to endoplasmic reticulum stress response (ER stress), a state in which the folding of proteins slows, leading to an increase in unfolded proteins. This stress is emerging as a potential cause of damage in hypoxia/ischemia, insulin resistance, and other disorders.

=== Protein transport ===
Secretory proteins, mostly glycoproteins, are moved across the endoplasmic reticulum membrane. Proteins that are transported by the endoplasmic reticulum throughout the cell are marked with an address tag called a signal sequence. The N-terminus (one end) of a polypeptide chain (i.e., a protein) contains a few amino acids that work as an address tag, which are removed when the polypeptide reaches its destination. Nascent peptides reach the ER via the translocon, a membrane-embedded multiprotein complex. Proteins that are destined for places outside the endoplasmic reticulum are packed into transport vesicles and moved along the cytoskeleton toward their destination. In human fibroblasts, the ER is always co-distributed with microtubules and the depolymerisation of the latter cause its co-aggregation with mitochondria, which are also associated with the ER.

The endoplasmic reticulum is also part of a protein sorting pathway. It is, in essence, the transportation system of the eukaryotic cell. The majority of its resident proteins are retained within it through a retention motif. This motif is composed of four amino acids at the end of the protein sequence. The most common retention sequences are KDEL for lumen-located proteins and KKXX for transmembrane proteins. However, variations of KDEL and KKXX do occur, and other sequences can also give rise to endoplasmic reticulum retention. It is not known whether such variation can lead to sub-ER localizations. There are three KDEL (1, 2 and 3) receptors in mammalian cells, and they have a very high degree of sequence identity. The functional differences between these receptors remain to be established.

=== Bioenergetics regulation of ER ATP supply by a CaATiER mechanism ===
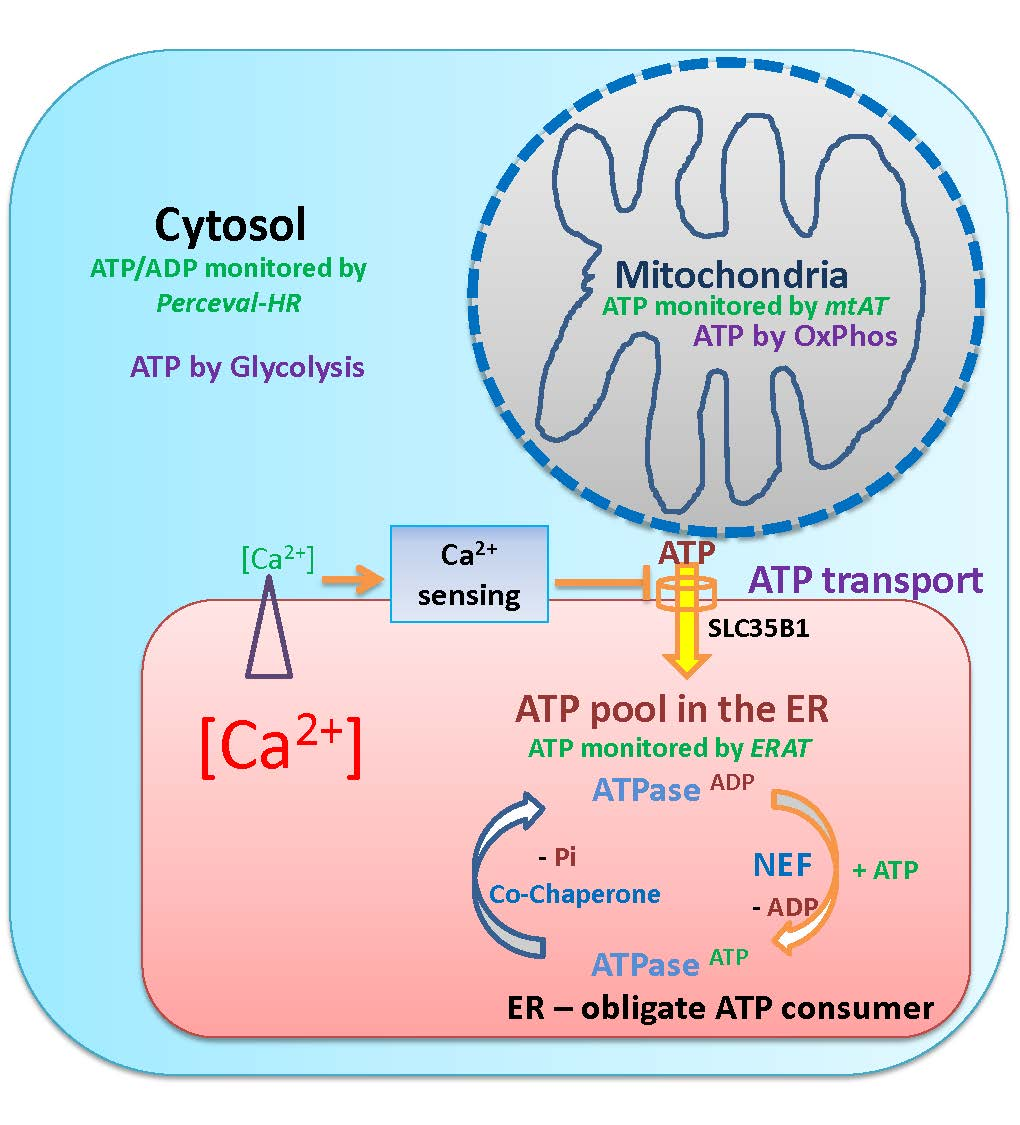
Ca2+-antagonized transport into the endoplasmic reticulum (CaATiER) model

The endoplasmic reticulum does not harbor an ATP-regeneration machinery, and therefore requires ATP import from mitochondria. The imported ATP is vital for the ER to carry out its house keeping cellular functions, such as for protein folding and trafficking.

The ER ATP transporter, SLC35B1/AXER, was recently cloned and characterized, and the mitochondria supply ATP to the ER through a Ca^{2+}-antagonized transport into the ER (CaATiER) mechanism. The CaATiER mechanism shows sensitivity to cytosolic Ca^{2+} ranging from high nM to low μM range, with the Ca^{2+}-sensing element yet to be identified and validated.

=== Membrane contact sites and cell migration ===
Beyond its biosynthetic and homeostatic roles, the endoplasmic reticulum is highly dynamic and forms membrane contact sites with other organelles and the plasma membrane, supporting lipid exchange, Ca^{2+} signalling and spatial control of signalling pathways. In migrating cells, ER–plasma membrane contact sites can become polarized, forming rear-to-front gradients that help maintain front–back polarity and directional migration. In epithelial monolayers, ER architecture can be reorganized by tissue edge curvature, influencing epithelial migration modes and tissue remodelling dynamics.

== Clinical significance ==
Increased and supraphysiological ER stress in pancreatic β cells disrupts normal insulin secretion, leading to hyperinsulinemia and consequently peripheral insulin resistance associated with obesity in humans. Human clinical trials also suggested a causal link between obesity-induced increase in insulin secretion and peripheral insulin resistance.

Abnormalities in XBP1 lead to a heightened endoplasmic reticulum stress response and subsequently causes a higher susceptibility for inflammatory processes that may even contribute to Alzheimer's disease. In the colon, XBP1 anomalies have been linked to the inflammatory bowel diseases including Crohn's disease.

The unfolded protein response (UPR) is a cellular stress response related to the endoplasmic reticulum. The UPR is activated in response to an accumulation of unfolded or misfolded proteins in the lumen of the endoplasmic reticulum. The UPR functions to restore normal function of the cell by halting protein translation, degrading misfolded proteins, and activating the signaling pathways that lead to increasing the production of molecular chaperones involved in protein folding. Sustained overactivation of the UPR has been implicated in prion diseases as well as several other neurodegenerative diseases and the inhibition of the UPR could become a treatment for those diseases.

== See also ==
- Ribosome-associated vesicle
