= Halperin–Birk syndrome =

Halpein–Birk syndrome
- Other names: HLBKS
- Specialty: Neurodevelopmental
- Symptoms: Intrauterine growth retardation, developmental delay, spastic quadriplegia with profound contractures, dysmorphism, microcephaly and agenesis of the corpus callosum
- Usual onset: Congenital
- Causes: SEC31 gene LOF mutation
- Prognosis: Early lethality

Halperin–Birk syndrome (HLBKS) is a rare autosomal recessive neurodevelopmental disorder caused by a null mutation in the SEC31A gene. Signs and symptoms include intrauterine growth retardation, marked developmental delay, spastic quadriplegia with profound contractures, dysmorphism, and optic nerve atrophy with no eye fixation. Brain MRI demonstrated microcephaly and agenesis of the corpus callosum.

The syndrome was first described in 2019 by Dr. Daniel Halperin and Prof. Ohad Birk at the Morris Kahn Laboratory for Human Genetics, Ben Gurion University of the Negev.

== Signs and symptoms ==
=== Inheritance ===
- Autosomal recessive

Autosomal recessive inheritance

=== Growth ===
- Intrauterine growth retardation
- Failure to thrive

=== Head & neck ===
- Head
  - Microcephaly
- Face
  - Triangular face
  - Pointed face
  - Micrognathia
- Ears
  - Hearing impairment
- Eyes
  - Cataracts, congenital
  - Optic atrophy
  - Lack of fixation
  - Visual impairment
  - Long eyelashes
- Mouth
  - High-arched palate Thick lips

=== Respiratory ===
- Recurrent aspiration

=== Gastrointestinal ===
- Gastroesophageal reflux

=== Skeletal ===
- Contractures
- Skull deformities
- Hip dislocation
- Clubfoot

=== Muscle, soft tissues ===
- Hypertonia

=== Neurologic ===
- Globally impaired development
- Impaired intellectual development
- Inability to walk
- Inability to speak
- Spastic quadriplegia
- Hyperreflexia
- Seizures
- Pseudobulbar palsy
- EEG abnormalities
- Semilobar holoprosencephaly seen on brain MRI
- Absent corpus callosum
- Colpocephaly

== Causes ==
Halperin–Birk syndrome describes a severe autosomal recessive neurodevelopmental disorder caused by a loss of function mutation in SEC31A, a component of the coat protein complex II (COPII). SEC31A (transcript variant 1; NM_ 001318120), also known as KIAA0905 and SEC31-related protein A (SEC31L1), encodes the transport protein SEC31A, a 1220 amino acid protein that is highly conserved through evolution. It contains multiple WD repeats near the N-terminus and conserved proline-rich region in its C-terminal. SEC31A is a component of the COPII protein complex, responsible for vesicle budding from the endoplasmic reticulum (ER). It has been demonstrated to be highly expressed in the notochord, optic tectum, otic vesicle, cleithrum, and fin during embryogenesis. Its importance to neuronal and craniofacial development has been demonstrated mainly through its efficient coupling with SEC13 and the SEC23-SEC31A interface. Failure to recruit SEC31A results in severe secretion defects of procollagen, and an enlarged ER, in line with aberrant protein secretion.

== Mechanism ==
The COP-II complex comprises five highly conserved proteins, among these SEC31A, creating small membrane vesicles that originate from the ER. Budding of these vesicles is essential in the cellular trafficking pathway, through which membrane and luminal cargo proteins are transported from their site of synthesis to other cellular compartments. This machinery assembles hierarchically, driven by the initial recruitment and activation of the small GTPase SAR1, which exists in a soluble cytoplasmic form when in its GDP-bound state. SAR1 is promoted by SEC12, a membrane-bound GEF that catalyzes GDP/GTP exchange. Once tightly anchored into the ER membrane, the active GTP-bound SAR1 recruits the SEC23-SEC24 heterodimer to form the inner "pre-budding" complex, capable of engaging cargo through interactions between SEC24 and multiple ER export motifs. Finally, the SEC13–SEC31A hetero-tetramer is recruited to promote coat polymerization, membrane curvature, and eventually membrane fission. With the full complement of the COP-II complex, the extruded membrane is separated from the ER membrane to form an intact vesicle.

Most mammalian COP-II complex subunits have one or more paralogues with partially redundant functions, as the loss of selected copies often results in a genetic disease. The mammalian repertoire consists of two SAR1 paralogs, SAR1A and SAR1B; two SEC23 paralogs, SEC23A and SEC23B; four SEC24 paralogs, SEC24A, SEC24B, SEC24C, and SEC24D; a single SEC13 and two SEC31 paralogs: SEC31A, comprising part of the SEC13/SEC31 hetero-tetramer, and SEC31B. The repertoire of COP-II paralogs available in mammals could contribute to a wide variety of COP-II coats, thus facilitating selective cargo transport in a tissue-specific manner. Alternative splicing could further contribute to the COP-II vesicle and cargo selection diversity.

Associated diseases/phenotypes with mutations in the COP-II complex genes described to date (2021)
Yeast COP-II	Mammalian COP-II	Organism	Associated disease/phenotypes	OMIM
SAR1p	SAR1A			
	SAR1B	Human	Chylomicron retention (CMRD)/Anderson's disease	246700
SEC23p	SEC23A	Human	Cranio-lenticulo-sutural dysplasia (CLSD)	607812
		Zebrafish	Skeletal and craniofacial development defects	
	SEC23B	Human	Congenital dyserythropoietic anemia type II (CDAII)	610512
		Zebrafish	Aberrant erythrocyte development	
SEC24p	SEC24A	Arabidopsis thaliana	Secretory and Golgi proteins accumulate in ER	
	SEC24B	Mice	Neural tube defects and craniorachischisis	
	SEC24C	Mice	Embryonic lethality	
	SEC24D	Human	Osteogenesis imperfecta-like syndrome	607186
		Zebrafish	Craniofacial dysmorphology, defects in trafficking of ECM proteins including type II collagen	
		Medaka	Skeletal and facial development defects	
		Mice	Early embryonic lethality	
SEC13p	SEC13	Zebrafish	Defects in proteoglycan deposition cause CLSD-like phenotype	
SEC31p	SEC31A	Human	Halperin–Birk syndrome	618615
	SEC31B			

== Molecular genetics ==
CRISPR/Cas9-mediated knockdown of the SEC31A gene in human SH-SY5Y neuroblastoma cells resulted in the failure of the cells to expand to generate viable clones. In addition, knockdown of the gene in HEK293 cells increased susceptibility to ER stress compared to controls. These results suggest that enhanced ER stress response is likely part of the molecular mechanism of the human disease.

== Diagnosis ==
There is no specific test to diagnose HLBKS other than exome/genome sequencing.

== Treatment ==
Currently, there are no genetic therapies specifically targeting the underlying cause of HLBKS. However, following the identification of the syndrome, a preimplantation genetic diagnosis (PGD) can be offered when one or both genetic parents are carriers of a mutation in this gene.

== Research ==
=== Animal model ===
In-vivo C. elegans experiments have demonstrated that SEC31A-deficient mutants are embryonically lethal due to various developmental defects. Halperin et al. (2019) found that complete loss of Sec31a in Drosophila was embryonically lethal and associated with eye and brain development defects, consistent with abnormal neurodevelopment.
