= Coatomer =

Protein complex that coats membrane-bound transport vesicles

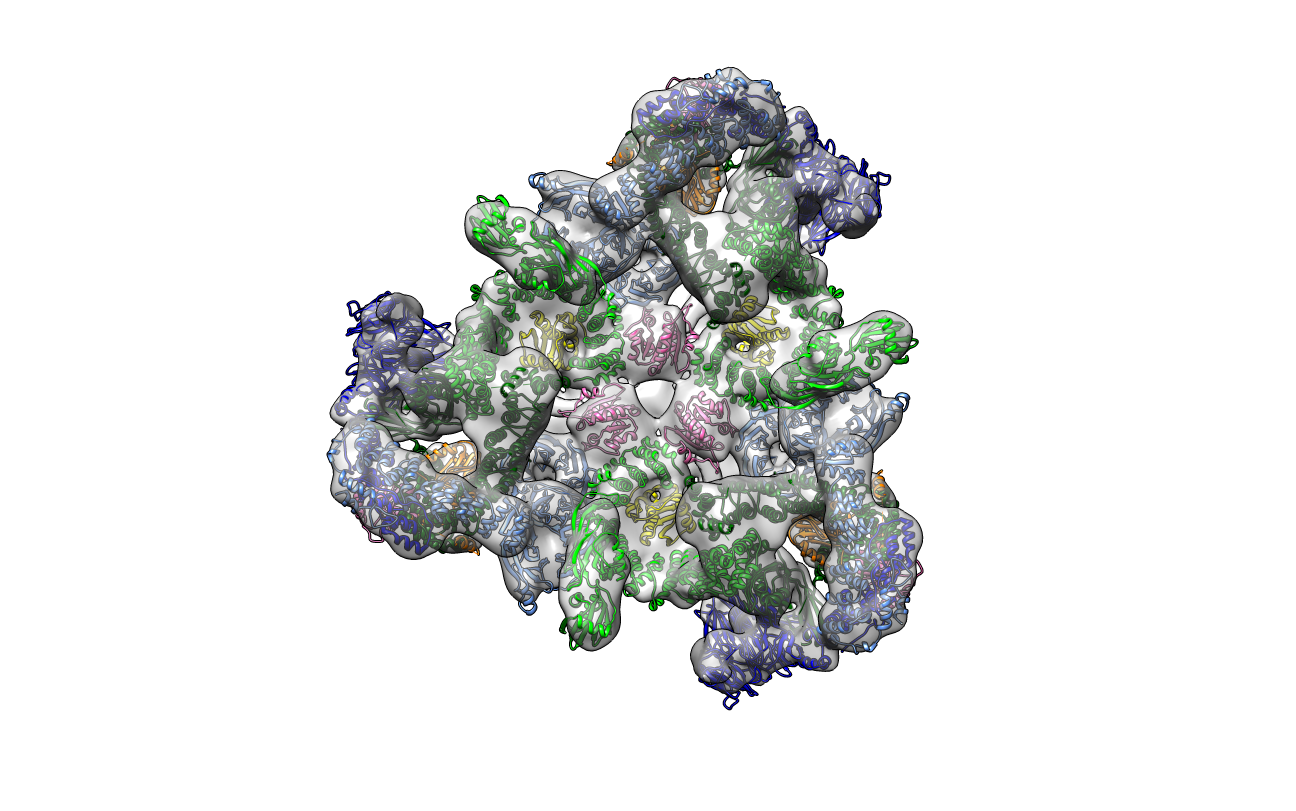
The COPI triad

The coatomer is a protein complex that coats membrane-bound transport vesicles. Two types of coatomers are known:

- COPI (retrograde transport from trans-Golgi network to cis-Golgi network and endoplasmic reticulum)
- COPII (anterograde transport from ER to the cis-Golgi)

Coatomers are functionally analogous and evolutionarily homologous to clathrin adaptor proteins, also known as adaptins, which regulate endocytosis from the plasma membrane and transport from the trans-Golgi network to lysosomes.

== Structure ==
The coatomer protein complex is made up of seven nonidentical protein subunits. These seven nonidentical protein subunits are part of two protein subcomplexes. The first subcomplex consists of Ret1(α-COP), Sec27(β’-COP), and Sec 28(ε-COP). The second subcomplex consists of Sec26 (β-COP), Sec21 (γ-COP), Ret2(δ-COP), and Ret3 (ζ-COP).

== COPI ==
COPI is a coatomer that coats the vesicles transporting proteins from the Golgi complex to the ER. This pathway is referred to as retrograde transport. Before the COP I protein can coat vesicles on the Golgi membrane, it must interact with a small GTPase called ARF1 (ADP ribosylation factor). ARF1 that is bound to GDP interacts with the Golgi complex membrane. Next, guanine nucleotide exchange factors (GEFs) in the Golgi complex membrane exchange the GDP bound to ARF1 for GTP. This activates ARF1, allowing it to insert an amphipathic alpha helix into the lipid bilayer of the Golgi complex. Next, the ARF1 protein recruits COP1 to the Golgi complex membrane by interacting with β-COP and γ-COP. Once the vesicle is coated, it begins to travel to the ER. Before the vesicle can fuse with the ER membrane, the coats surrounding the vesicle must dissociate. ARF-GAP1 is responsible for deactivating the ARF1 protein by activating the GTPase. When ARF1 switches to its GDP- bound conformation, it causes the COP1 coat to destabilize.

The COP1 proteins recognize the proper cargo by interacting with sorting signals on the cytoplasmic domains of the protein. The most common sorting signals include the amino acid sequence KKXX or KDEL. KKXX signals are associated with transmembrane ER domains and KDEL signals are associated with proteins in the ER lumen. COP1 coated vesicles also contain p24 proteins that assist with cargo sorting.

== COPII ==
COPII is a coatomer that coats the vesicles transporting proteins from the ER to the golgi complex. This pathway is referred to as anterograde transport. The first step in the COPII pathway is the recruitment of a small GTPase named Sar1 to the ER membrane. Once Sar1 interacts with the ER membrane, a membrane protein called Sec12 acts a guanine nucleotide exchange factor and substitutes GDP for GTP on Sar1. This activates the Sar1 protein, causing its amphipathic alpha helix to bind to the ER membrane. Membrane bound Sar1 attracts the Sec23-Sec24 protein heterodimer to the ER membrane. Sar1 directly binds to Sec23 while Sec24 directly binds to the cargo receptor located on the ER membrane.

The Sar1-GTP and Sec23-24 complex recruits another protein complex called Sec13/Sec31. This complex polymerizes to form the outer layer of the coat. COP II vesicles must shed their coat before they can fuse with the cis-Golgi membrane. This occurs when the GTP on Sar1 is hydrolyzed by the GTPase activating protein. Activation of the GTPase also reverses the interaction between Sar1 and the Sec23-Sec24 protein dimer. COPII vesicles select the proper cargo by directly interacting with ER export signals that are present in transmembrane ER proteins. There are several classes of ER export signals that have been identified in various organisms. The involvement of so many different ER export signals means that there are multiple binding sites for the export signals.

== Diseases associated with defects in COP ==
Newly made secretory proteins must pass through the ER and the golgi complex before they can leave the cell. Problems with COPII early secretory pathways can lead to a disease called Congenital Dyserythropoietic Anemia type II. This is an autosomal recessive disorder that results from the mutation of a gene called Sec23B. This gene plays an important role in regulating the transport of proteins within cells. Symptoms for Congenital Dyserythropoietic Anemia type II include anemia, jaundice, low reticulocyte count, splenomegaly, and hemochromatosis. Congenital Dyserythropoeitic Anemia Type II is normally diagnosed during adolescence or early adulthood. Congenital Dyserythropoetic Anemia Type II is a very rare disease with only a few hundred cases worldwide. Treatment for the disease involves blood transfusions, iron therapy, and the removal of the spleen.

Another disease associated with deficiencies in the COPII pathway is combined factor V and factor VIII deficiency. In this disease, the person produces Factor V and VIII but they can not transport factor V or VIII into the bloodstream. This is an autosomal recessive disorder that leads to bleeding symptoms, epistaxis, menorrhagia, and excessive bleeding after trauma. The disease can be diagnosed after screening tests are analyzed by a specialized healthcare provider. The mutation of the MCFD2 gene is what causes combined factor V and VIII deficiency. Treatment for the disease includes administrating frozen plasma and desmopressin to the patient.
