= LOC105377021 =

Putative gene in humans

Identifiers
- Aliases: uncharacterized LOC105377021
- External IDs: GeneCards:
Orthologs
Databases	NCBI: entry
Species	Human	Mouse
Entrez	105377021	n/a
Ensembl	n/a	n/a
UniProt	n a	n/a
RefSeq (mRNA)	XM_011534334	n/a
RefSeq (protein)	n/a	n/a
Location (UCSC)	n/a	n/a
PubMed search		n/a
- Wikidata
View/Edit Human

LOC105377021 is a putative gene found in humans whose NCBI record was withdrawn in 2021 due to insufficient evidence that it was a distinct gene.

== Gene and mRNA ==
LOC105377021 localizes to Homo sapiens chromosome 3 (3p2; antisense strand), approximate to the reading frame of TRIM71. The corresponding gene has 2,473 nucleotides. There is one exon in the LOC105377021p mRNA. There is no predicted alternative splicing on the NCBI gene database.

== Microarray expression pattern and pathology ==
=== Brain tissue expression ===
Seven key brain tissues express LOC105377021 according to an Allen Brain Atlas probe. The temporal lobe, parietal lobe, cingulate gyrus, parahippocampal gyrus, and insula are five overarching regions of the seven brain tissues where expression was highlighted. The annotated figures below serve as fairly holistic representations of cranial expression in the context of LOC105377021. Light blue shaded regions posit more dense expression of LOC105377021, where as darker green and brighter red show less and least amounts of expression respectively. All seven expression areas, including the middle temporal gyrus, the short insular gyrus, the postcentral gyrus, the cingulate gyrus, the inferior temporal gyrus, the parahippocampal gyrus, and the superior temporal gyrus are depicted in Allen Brain Atlas profiles below.

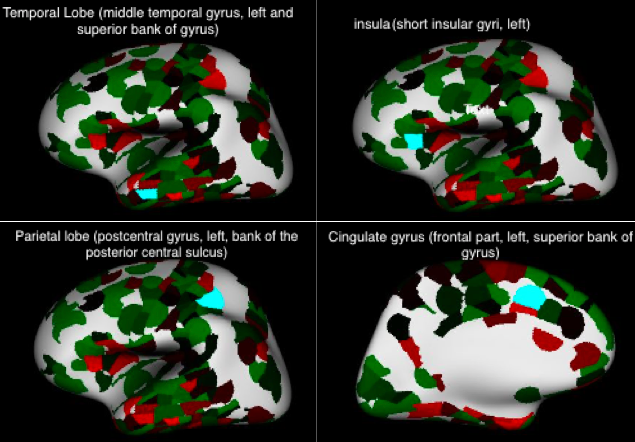

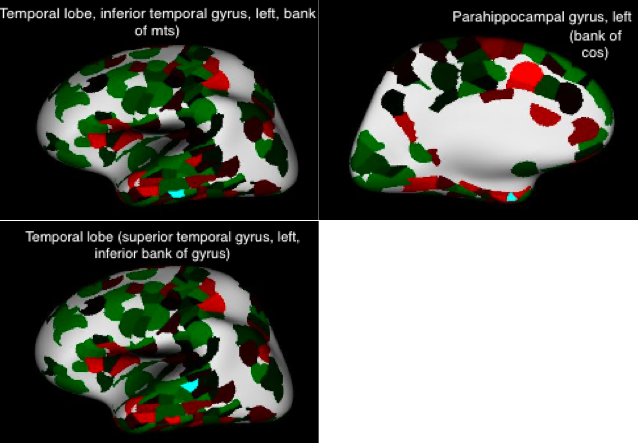

== Evolutionary relationships and homology ==
=== Orthologs ===
The Basic Local Alignment Sequence Tool (BLAST) shows that LOC105377021 orthologs are largely homogeneous and mammalian. Important orthologs are summarized into three categories: primates, aquatic mammals, and ferrets/ferret-like animals. Pongo abelii and Tursiops truncatus are the most distant and related orthologs respectively. The river dolphin is the first ortholog to detach from the 80% plus similarity cohort. The following includes a list of select orthologs found:

Common name	Genus species	NCBI Accession Number	% Similarity	% Identity	Protein Length (in amino acids)	Ortholog Aliases
Human	Homo sapiens	XP_011532636.1	100	100	168	LOC389102, YPLR6490, UNQ6490, PRO21339
Sumatran orangutan	Pongo abelii	XP_002814002.1	98	98	170	LOC100446670
Squirrel Monkey	Saimiri boliviensis boliviensis	XP_010339850.1	96	96	167	LOC101034964
Golden snub -nosed monkey	Rhinopithecus roxellana	XP_010352756.1	96	95	170	LOC104655070
Olive baboon	Papio anubis	XP_003895275.1	96	95	170	LOC101001601
Angolan Black and White Colobus	Colobus angolensis palliatus	XP_011816934.1	95	92	171	LOC105525785
Mouse lemur	Microbus murinus	XP_012624670.1	93	92	169	LOC105873906
Northern greater galago	Otolemur garnettii	XP_012661211.1	89	87	167	LOC100965366
Sunda Flying Lemur	Galeopterus variegatus	XP_008581853	87	86	151	LOC103599484
Killer Whale	Orcinus orca	XP_004279764.1	82	80	282	SEC31
Sperm Whale	Physeter catodon	XP_007125317.1	82	80	230	LOC10299578
Baiji	Litotes vexillifer	XP_007464989.1	78	76	217	LOC103081437
Star-Nosed Mole	Condylura cristata	XP_012590632.1	77	74	162	LOC101633309
Aardvark	Orycteropus afer afer	XP_007946855.1	76	71	186	LOC103203593
Cape Elephant Shrew	Elephantulus edwardii	XP_006890725.1	71	67	225	LOC102845592
Cape Golden Mole	Chrysochloris asiatica	XP_006859232.1	69	66	264	LOC102816436
Bactrian camel	Camels bactrianus	XP_010958002.1	54	54	126	LOC105072685
Common Bottlenose Dolphin	Tursiops truncatus	XP_004315393.1	50	46	166	LOC101335194

=== Pace of evolution ===
The pace of evolution of LOC105377021 upon its inception (in humans) is modeled to be slow. This speed is relative to cytochrome c 6A1 and Alpha fibrinogen using corrected divergence methods.

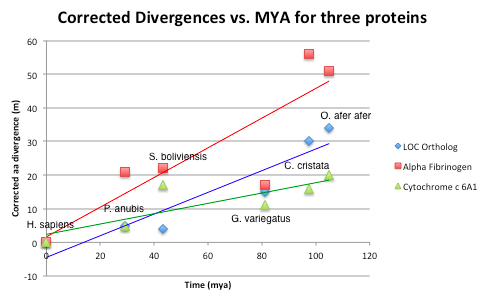

The corrected divergences graph above shows three lines: Alpha Fibrinogen in Red, LOC Ortholog (a.k.a. LOC105377021) in blue, and Cytochrome c 6A1 in green. These lines associate with evolutionary pace in LOC105377021, as tested using a corrected divergence genomic analysis.

=== Single nucleotide polymorphisms ===
The following diagram shows single nucleotide polymorphisms (SNP's) in various regions of the protein. SNP's are highlighted green, with SNP coding on the right hand coding for switches in amino acids.

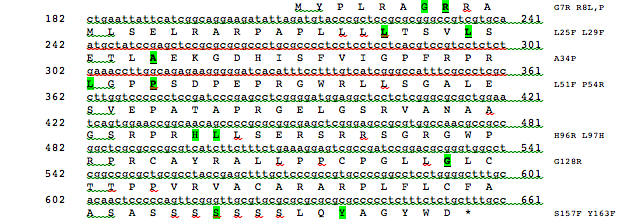

Polymorphism	Chemical Nature prior to Polymorphism	Chemical Nature after Polymorphism
G7R	Non polar	Basic
R8L,P	Basic	Non polar
L25F	Non polar	Non polar
L29F	Non polar	Non polar
A34P	Non polar	Non polar
L51F	Non polar	Non polar
P54R	Non polar	Basic
H96R	Basic	Basic
L97H	Non polar	Basic
G128R	Non polar	Basic
S157F	Polar	Non polar
Y163F	Polar	Non polar

== Promoter and gene regulation ==
According to Genomatix, LOC389102 (synonym to LOC105377021) is proximate to a 601 base pair promoter and a 5'UTR 129 base pairs long consecutively. Genomatix predicts several transcription factors in general. Two select factors predicted include Gli3 and E2F1.
