= Ohad Birk =

Israeli physician and scientist

- אוהד בירק
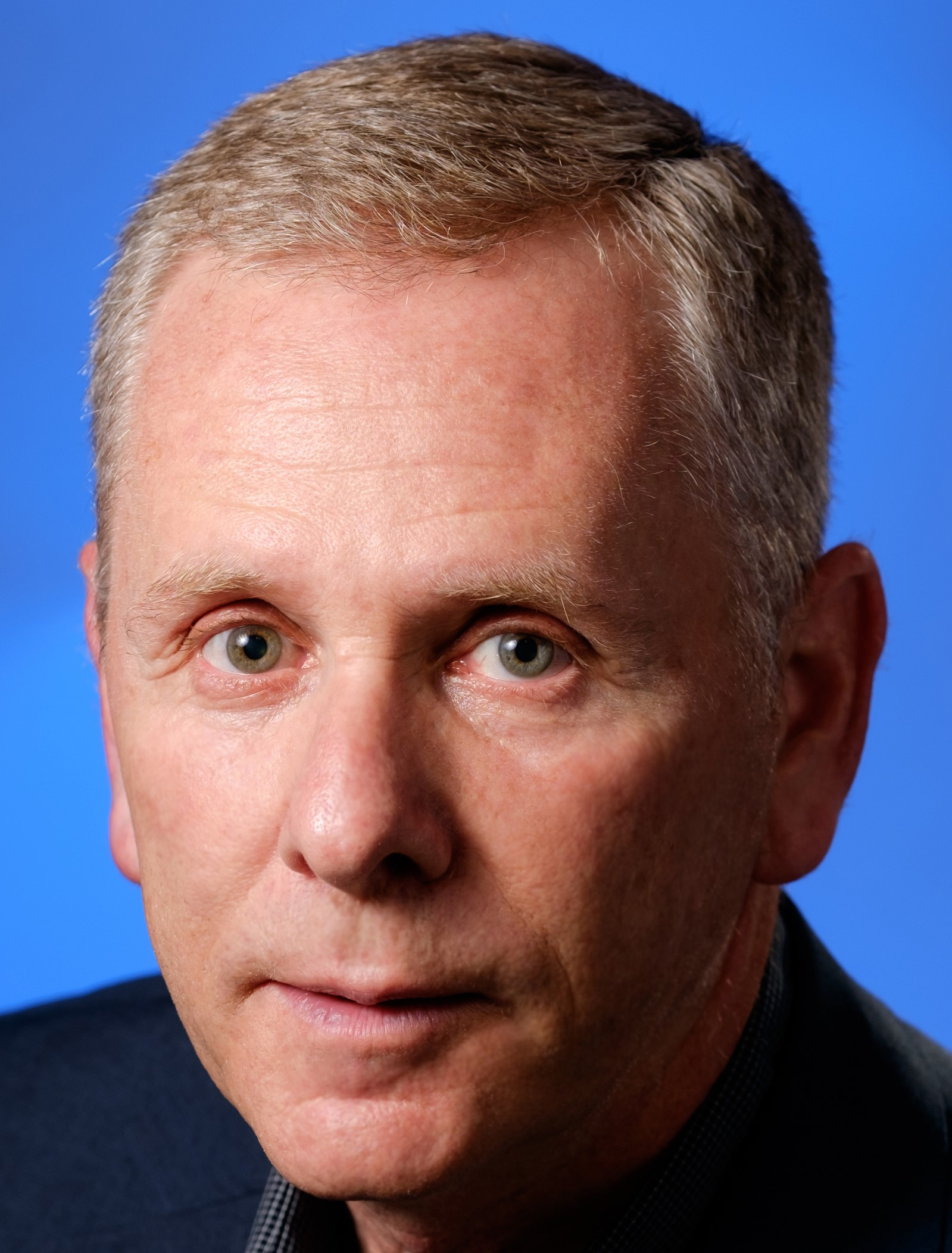
- Born: Rehovot
- Scientific career
- Fields: Medicine, Human Genetics
- Institutions: Ben-Gurion University of the Negev and Soroka Medical Center
- Doctoral advisor: Irun Cohen
- Website: nibn.co.il/researcher/prof-ohad-birk/

Ohad Birk (Hebrew: אוהד בירק) a physician-scientist, is a professor of human genetics, converging basic scientific research with effective clinical translational applications. Birk's research lab deciphered the molecular basis and mechanism of more than 30 human diseases, including some of the most prevalent severe hereditary diseases in Arabs and in Jews, as well as three syndromes named after Birk. He also implemented his scientific findings in massive carrier testing programs, conducive to 30% reduction in infant mortality rate in the Bedouin community, as well as near-eradication of two of the most common severe hereditary diseases in Sephardic Jews. Birk heads the clinical Genetics Institute at Soroka Medical Center and the Morris Kahn Laboratory of Human Genetics as well as Israel's National Research Center for Orphan / Rare Diseases at Ben Gurion University, and served as director of Israel's National Institute of Biotechnology in the Negev (NIBN) between 2016 and 2017.

Professor Birk is a recipient of numerous awards and published in top scientific journals such as Nature, Nature Genetics, PNAS and American Journal of Human Genetics. The translational impact of his work has been well echoed also in the lay press, from the NY Times to Al Jazeera and BBC World.

== Biography ==
=== Personal ===
Born and raised in Rehovot, Israel. Son of Prof. Meir Birk and Prof. Yehudith Birk. Brother of Prof. Yitzhak (Tsahi) Birk. Married to Prof. Ruth Birk. Father of Yonatan and Michael. Birk is amateur pianist and composer.

=== Professional training and early studies ===
Following MD studies at Tel Aviv University, military service as a medical officer (Major) in the IDF and residency in Pediatrics at Sheba Medical Center, Birk did his PhD at the Weizmann Institute with Irun Cohen, delineating hsp60 as a crucial autoantigen in type 1 diabetes and allograft rejection, effective in their prevention. He then went on to do his training in clinical human genetics and post-doctorate with Heiner Westphal at the NIH, unraveling LHX9 as a gene critical for mammalian gonad formation.

=== Research ===
Birk's team deciphered the molecular basis and mechanism of more than 30 human diseases, including some of the most prevalent severe hereditary diseases in Arabs and in Jews worldwide. Among the many diseases discovered are Progressive Cerebello Cerebral Atrophy (PCCA) and PCCA2, two of the most common severe genetic diseases in Sephardic Jews, the first gene for near-sightedness, as well as three genetic syndromes named after professor Birk. Human Genetics studies in the Birk lab (named after philanthropist Morris Kahn) span from generation of novel bioinformatics tools, to the clinical delineation and molecular identification of novel disease-associated genes, to in-depth developmental biology and molecular biochemistry studies discovering novel molecular pathways in health and disease. Human diseases whose molecular basis was discovered in the Birk lab include:

- Birk - Barel syndrome: genomic imprinting mental retardation syndrome due to KCN9 mutation.
- Birk - Flusser syndrome: dysmorphic mental retardation due to FRMD4A mutation.
- PCCA – Progressive Cerebello-Cerebral Atrophy: due to SEPSECS mutation, precluding selenium incorporation. 1:40 Iraqi Jews and 1:40 Moroccan Jews is a carrier. Routine free carrier testing in Israel as of 2011.
- PCCA2 – Progressive Cerebello-Cerebral Atrophy type 2: due to VPS53 mutation, abrogating function of the gARP complex. 1:37 Moroccan Jews is a carrier. Routine free carrier testing in Israel as of 2016.
- Myopia: the first identification of monogenic non-syndromic myopia gene: Near-sightedness caused by a mutation in LEPREL1, encoding Prolyl 3-hydroxylase 2.
- UNC80-associated syndrome of hypotonia, intellectual disability, dyskinesia, dysmorphism.
- Microcephaly caused by WDFY3 (ALFY) mutation – delineating novel pathway controlling Wnt signaling.
- CCDC174-associated syndrome of hypotonia and psychomotor retardation – caused by a founder mutation shared by Bedouins and Ethiopian Jews; delineating CCDC174 as a novel component of the exon junction complex.
- Foveal hypoplasia caused by SLC38A8 (1:10 Mumbai Indian Jews is a carrier).
- Adams Oliver syndrome: caused by EOGT mutation (discovered in parallel to and independent of the group of Alkuraya)
- Lethal congenital contractural syndrome (arthrogryposis) type 2 (LCCS2) - caused by a mutation in ERBB3 (Her3).
- Lethal congenital contractural syndrome (arthrogryposis) type 3 (LCCS3) - caused by a mutation in PIP5K1C of the phosphatidylinositol pathway.
- Lethal congenital contractural syndrome (arthrogryposis) type 4 (LCCS4) - caused by a mutation in MYBPC1.
- Autosomal recessive osteogenesis imperfecta (OI) caused by mutation in TMEM38B (discovered in parallel to and independent of the group of Alkuraya)
- Meconium ileus (non-CF) caused by inactivating mutation in GUCY2C, encoding the CFTR-activating guanylate cyclase C.
- Hyperchlorhidrosis caused by mutation in CA12, encoding carbonic anhydrase XII.
- Connatal Pelizaeus-Merzbacher-like disease (PMLD) caused by AIMP1/p43 mutation.
- Mitochondrial complex III deficiency due to UQCRQ mutation
- Congenital cataract (recessive) due to CRYBB1 mutation.
- Microphthalmia / anophthalmia (non-syndromic) caused by CHX10 mutation
- Infantile neuroaxonal dystrophy: demonstrating that it is a storage disease caused by a mutation in PLA2G6, encoding phospholipase A2 group IV (discovered parallel to and independent of the group of Hayflick).
- Seborrhea-like dermatitis with psoriasis-like elements caused by mutation in ZNF750, a novel master transcription factor controlling skin barrier formation.
- A neurological disorder caused by DEGS mutation (discovered in parallel to and independent of the group of Pant et al.)
- A microcephaly syndrome caused by mutations in the microtubule-associated protein MAP11 (C7orf43, TRAPPC14, MCPH25).
- Progressive hereditary spastic paraplegia caused by KY mutation
- A syndrome of hypotonia and global neurodevelopmental delay caused by PAX7 mutation.
- Intellectual disability syndrome caused by RSRC1 mutation, causing aberrant splicing and transcription, downregulating IGFBP3.
- Bardet Biedl syndrome caused by mutation in SCAPER
- A novel neurological disease caused by SEC31A mutation, affecting endoplasmic reticulum homeostasis.
- Nocturnal atrial fibrillation caused by gain of function mutation in KCND2, encoding pore-forming alpha subunit of the cardiac Kv4.2 potassium channel.
- Gout caused by aberrant D-lactate dehydrogenase
- Birk–Landau-Perez syndrome, a novel cerebro-renal syndrome caused by SLC30A9 mutations.
