= Transmembrane protein 255A =

Mammalian protein found in Homo sapiens

TMEM255A

Identifiers
- Aliases: TMEM255A, FAM70A, transmembrane protein 255A
- External IDs: MGI: 3045722; HomoloGene: 9927; GeneCards: TMEM255A; OMA:TMEM255A - orthologs

Gene location (Human)
Chr.	X chromosome (human)
Band	Xq24	Start	120,258,650 bp
Band	Xq24	End	120,311,556 bp

Gene location (Mouse)
Chr.	X chromosome (mouse)
Band	X|X A3.3	Start	37,285,450 bp
Band	X|X A3.3	End	37,341,316 bp
RNA expression pattern
Bgee	Human / Mouse (ortholog); Top expressed in: pars reticulata; pars compacta; spinal ganglia; superior vestibular nucleus; germinal epithelium; hypothalamus; pons; trigeminal ganglion; testicle; dorsal motor nucleus of vagus nerve / Top expressed in: substantia nigra; facial motor nucleus; paraventricular nucleus of hypothalamus; arcuate nucleus; median eminence; mammillary body; ventromedial nucleus; lateral hypothalamus; ventral tegmental area; suprachiasmatic nucleus; More reference expression data
BioGPS	n/a
Orthologs
Species	Human	Mouse
Entrez	55026	245386
Ensembl	ENSG00000125355	ENSMUSG00000036502
UniProt	Q5JRV8	Q8BHW5
RefSeq (mRNA)	NM_001104544; NM_001104545; NM_017938	NM_001289727; NM_001289728; NM_172930
RefSeq (protein)	NP_001098014; NP_001098015; NP_060408	NP_001276656; NP_001276657; NP_766518
Location (UCSC)	Chr X: 120.26 – 120.31 Mb	Chr X: 37.29 – 37.34 Mb
PubMed search
- Wikidata
View/Edit Human	View/Edit Mouse

Transmembrane protein 255A is a protein that is encoded by the TMEM255A gene. TMEM255A is often referred to as family with sequence similarity 70, member A (FAM70A). The TMEM255A protein is transmembrane and is predicted to be located the nuclear envelope of eukaryote organisms.

== Gene ==
Human X chromosome with the location of TMEM255A marked at q24.

The TMEM25A gene (often referred to as Family with Sequence Similarity 70 Member A; FAM70A) is located on Xq24, spanning 60,555 base pairs. TMEM255A is flanked by the genes ATPase Na+/K+ transporting family member beta 4 (ATP1B4) and NF_{K}B activating protein pseudogene 1 (NKAPP1).

== mRNA ==
There are three variants of the transcript seen, where isoform 1 is the longest. The 5’- and 3’- UTRs of the mRNA spans 227 and 2207 base pairs, respectively, and are predicted to contain several stem-loops. The mRNA is 3512 base pairs long and the gene consists of 9 exons.

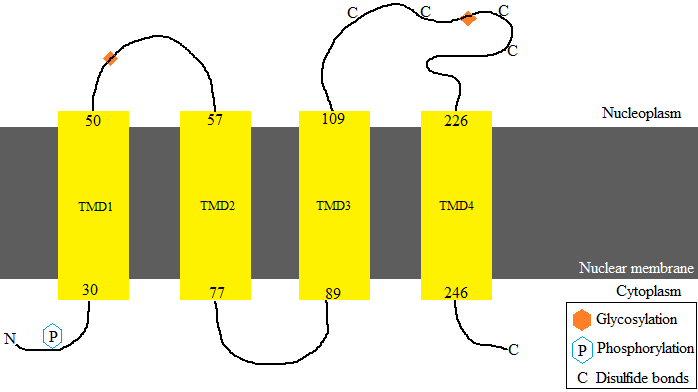
A prediction of TMEM255A's location in the nuclear membrane of Eukaryotic cells.

== Protein ==
The longest protein encoded for is isoform 1, which spans 349 amino acids, and is predicted to have a molecular weight at 38 kDa and isoelectric point at pH 7.89. Compared to the average vertebrate protein, TMEM255A is rich in aspartic acid, isoleucine, proline and tyrosine, and relatively poor in glutamic acid and lysine. No charge clusters have been found in this protein.

The protein is predicted to be post-translationally modified by phosphorylation and glycosylation. The protein is predicted to have four transmembrane domains in the nuclear membrane. The structure of the protein is predicted to be helical in the transmembrane domains. Disulfide bonds are predicted to be found in the region in between transmembrane domains 3 and 4, which indicates that this particular region is located in the nucleoplasm.

Isoform	Accession number	Description
1	NP_060408.3	The longest transcript and isoform
2	NP_001098014.1	Shorter protein product than isoform 1, lacks one in-frame alternative midsection exon
3	NP_001098015.1	Lacks three in-frame exons. Shorter than isoform 1 and 2.

== Expression ==
TMEM255A is predicted to be most abundantly expressed in nerve, brain, testis, ovary, thymus and kidney. The protein is expressed in a variety of tissues, but at relatively moderate levels.

== Regulation of expression ==
Both the 5' and 3' Untranslated Regions (UTRs) are predicted to consist of several stem-loops. The 3' UTR also contain a conserved miRNA target site (amino acids 22-29). Phosphorylation and glycosylation sites have also been predicted in TMEM255A.

== Interacting proteins ==
Affinity Capture MS experimentally predicts that TMEM255A interacts with ten different proteins; Ankyrin repeat domain 13D (ANKRD13D), Collagen beta (1-O) galactosyltransferase 2 (COLGALT2), Grancalcin (GCA), Itchy E3 ubiquitin protein ligase (ITCH), Potassium channel tetramerization domain containing 2 (KCTD2), Neural precursor cell expressed developmentally down-regulated 4 (NEDD4), SEC24 family member B (SEC24D), Ubiquitin associated and SH3 domain containing B (UBASH3D), WW domain containing E3 ubiquitin protein ligase 1 and 2 (WWP1, WWP2) - most of these are included in ubiquitination processes, transcription regulation and protein degradation.

== Clinical significance ==
TMEM255A is predicted to be highly expressed in peroxisome proliferator-activated receptor γ coactivator 1α-upregulated glioblastoma multiforme cells (specific gene function not yet fully established). Ongoing research is investigating the possibility of TMEM255A to be used in personalized immunotherapy.

== Homology ==
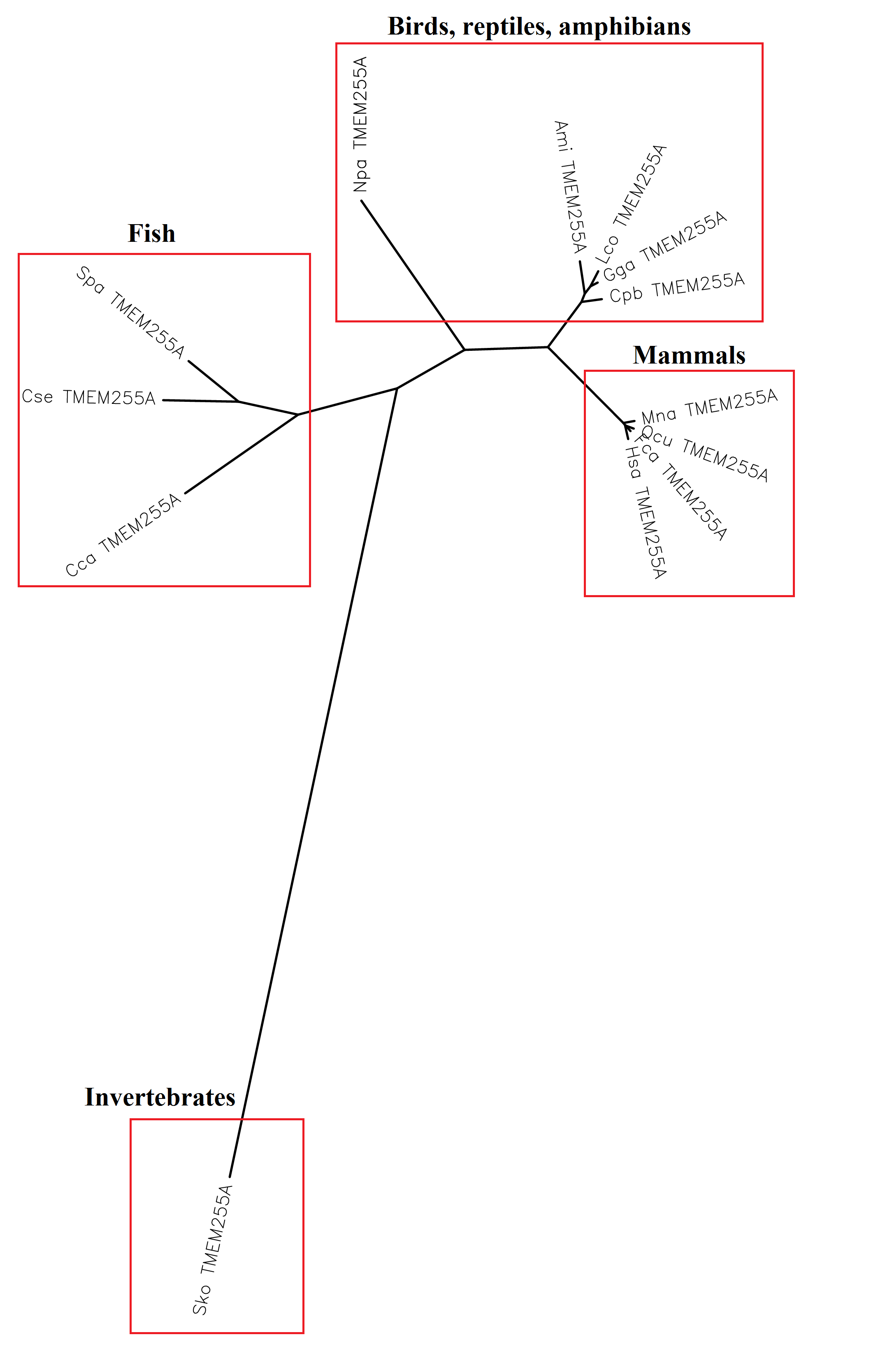
This time-calibrated phylogenetic tree shows the evolution of TMEM255A through its journey of human evolution. The distance on the tree correlates to years since divergence.

There is one known paralog for TMEM255A, called TMEM255B, which is found on chromosome 13 (position 13q34). TMEM255A is only found in the kingdom of animalia, and its most distant homolog is found in invertebrata (i.e. Saccoglossus kowalenskii).

Species	NCBI Accession #	Divergence (MYA)	Sequence length (aa)	Sequence ID (%)	Sequence similarity (%)
Homo sapiens (Human)	NP_060408.3	-	349	100	100
Elephantulus edwardii (Cape Elephant Shrew)	XP_006893850.1	105	351	97	98
Gallus gallus (Chicken)	XP_015134112.1	312	323	79	84
Chrysemys picta bellii (Painted turtle)	XP_008167250.1	312	323	79	84
Nanorana parkeri (High Himalaya frog)	XP_018415588.1	352	327	69	77
Cyprinus carpio (Common carp)	XP_018971120.1	435	342	58	67
Saccoglossus kowalevskii (Acorn worm)	XP_006819139.1	684	351	23	45
