= Hypocholesterolemia =

- Other names: Low cholesterol
- Formula structure of cholesterol
- Causes: Statins, hyperthyroidism, adrenal insufficiency, malabsorption, malnutrition, etc.

Hypocholesterolemia is the presence of abnormally low (hypo-) levels of cholesterol in the blood (-emia). A defect in the body's production of cholesterol can lead to adverse consequences as well. Cholesterol is an essential component of mammalian cell membranes and is required to establish proper membrane permeability and fluidity. It is not clear if a lower than average cholesterol level is directly harmful; however, it is often encountered in particular illnesses.

== Presentation ==
=== Role in disease ===
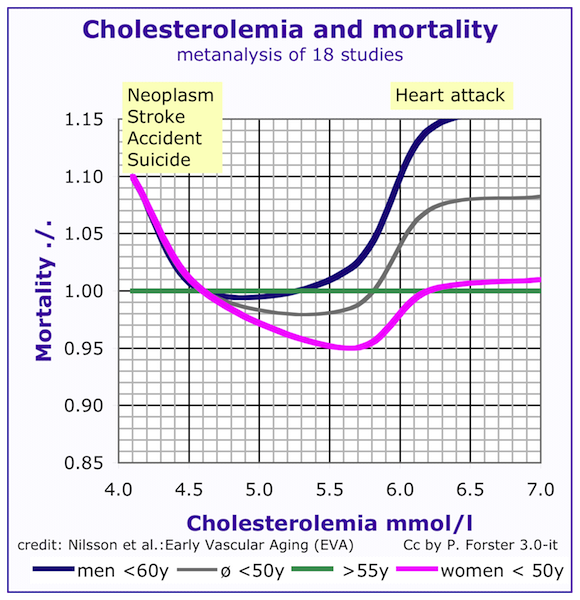
Cholesterolemia and mortality for men and women <50 years and >60 years

With the increased use of medication to suppress cholesterol, some have expressed concern that lowering cholesterol levels excessively will itself cause disease.

==== Specific disease entities ====
Demographic studies suggest that cholesterol levels form a U-shape curve when plotted against mortality; this suggests that low cholesterol is associated with increased mortality, mainly due to depression, cancer, hemorrhagic stroke, aortic dissection and respiratory diseases. It is possible that whatever causes the low cholesterol level also causes mortality, and that the low cholesterol is simply a marker of poor health.

Links with depression have been supported by studies. In contrast, no evidence was found for a link with hemorrhagic stroke (although higher cholesterol levels conferred a relative protection), and neither did statin drugs worsen the risk.

The Heart Protection Study found no increase in either respiratory disease or neuropsychiatric illness in a large trial population taking a statin drug.

==== Elderly ====
In the elderly, low cholesterol may confer a health risk that may not be offset by the beneficial effects of cholesterol lowering. Similarly, for elderly patients admitted to hospital, low cholesterol may predict short-term mortality. The prevalence of hypocholesterolemia in the elderly ranges between 2% and 36%, depending on specific cutoff levels and age range investigated. Alerting physicians to hypocholesterolemia may benefit some of their patients who take cholesterol-lowering drugs and decrease the rate of their emergency room visits.

==== Critical illness ====
In the setting of critical illness, low cholesterol levels are predictive of clinical deterioration, and are correlated with altered cytokine levels.

== Causes ==
Possible causes of low cholesterol are:

- statins
- hyperthyroidism, or an overactive thyroid gland
- adrenal insufficiency
- liver disease
- malabsorption (inadequate absorption of nutrients from the intestines), such as in celiac disease
- malnutrition
- abetalipoproteinemia – a rare genetic disease that causes cholesterol readings below 50 mg/dL. It is found mostly in Jewish populations.
- hypobetalipoproteinemia – a genetic disease that causes cholesterol readings below 50 mg/dL
- manganese deficiency
- Smith–Lemli–Opitz syndrome
- Marfan syndrome
- leukemias and other hematological diseases

== Diagnosis ==
=== Classification ===
According to the American Heart Association in 1994, only total cholesterol levels below 160 mg/dL or 4.1 mmol/L are to be classified as "hypocholesterolemia". However, this is not agreed on universally and some put the level lower.
