= SEC24B =

Protein-coding gene in the species Homo sapiens

Identifiers
- Aliases: SEC24B, SEC24, SEC24 homolog B, COPII coat complex component
- External IDs: OMIM: 607184; MGI: 2139764; GeneCards: SEC24B
Available structures
PDB	Human UniProt search: PDBe RCSB
PDB	List of PDB id codes 3EH1

Gene location (Human)
Chr.	Chromosome 4 (human)
Band	4q25	Start	109,433,772 bp
Band	4q25	End	109,540,896 bp

Gene location (Mouse)
Chr.	Chromosome 3 (mouse)
Band	3|3 G3	Start	129,776,408 bp
Band	3|3 G3	End	129,855,202 bp
RNA expression pattern
Bgee	Human / Mouse (ortholog); Top expressed in: cartilage tissue; skin of hip; skin of thigh; retinal pigment epithelium; biceps brachii; Skeletal muscle tissue of biceps brachii; jejunal mucosa; germinal epithelium; mucosa of sigmoid colon; Epithelium of choroid plexus / Top expressed in: genital tubercle; tail of embryo; granulocyte; ventricular zone; neural layer of retina; lip; saccule; dentate gyrus of hippocampal formation granule cell; superior frontal gyrus; muscle of thigh; More reference expression data
BioGPS	n/a
Gene ontology
Molecular function	protein binding; zinc ion binding; metal ion binding
Cellular component	cytoplasm; endoplasmic reticulum membrane; Golgi membrane; endoplasmic reticulum; membrane; COPII vesicle coat; cytosol; ER to Golgi transport vesicle membrane; cytoplasmic vesicle; COPII-coated ER to Golgi transport vesicle
Biological process	lung morphogenesis; antigen processing and presentation of exogenous peptide antigen via MHC class II; pulmonary artery morphogenesis; antigen processing and presentation of peptide antigen via MHC class I; regulation of establishment of planar polarity involved in neural tube closure; coronary artery morphogenesis; outflow tract morphogenesis; auditory receptor cell morphogenesis; aorta morphogenesis; auditory receptor cell stereocilium organization; neural tube closure; COPII vesicle coating; protein transport; intracellular protein transport; regulation of cargo loading into COPII-coated vesicle; lung lobe morphogenesis; cochlear nucleus development; endoplasmic reticulum to Golgi vesicle-mediated transport; vesicle-mediated transport; COPII-coated vesicle cargo loading
Sources:Amigo / QuickGO
Orthologs
Databases	NCBI: entry; OMA: entry
Species	Human	Mouse
Entrez	10427	99683
Ensembl	ENSG00000138802	ENSMUSG00000001052
UniProt	O95487	n/a
RefSeq (mRNA)	NM_001042734; NM_001300813; NM_006323; NM_001318085; NM_001318086	NM_207209
RefSeq (protein)	NP_001036199; NP_001287742; NP_001305014; NP_001305015; NP_006314	n/a
Location (UCSC)	Chr 4: 109.43 – 109.54 Mb	Chr 3: 129.78 – 129.86 Mb
PubMed search
- Wikidata
View/Edit Human	View/Edit Mouse

Protein transport protein Sec24B is a protein that in humans is encoded by the SEC24B gene.

The protein encoded by this gene is a member of the SEC24 subfamily of the SEC23/SEC24 family, which is involved in vesicle trafficking. The encoded protein has similarity to yeast Sec24p component of COPII. COPII is the coat protein complex responsible for vesicle budding from the ER. The role of this gene product is implicated in the shaping of the vesicle, and also in cargo selection and concentration. Two transcript variants encoding different isoforms have been found for this gene.
