= SEC31A =

Protein-coding gene in the species Homo sapiens

Identifiers
- Aliases: SEC31A, ABP125, ABP130, HSPC334, SEC31L1, HSPC275, SEC31 homolog A, COPII coat complex component, NEDSOSB, HPBKS
- External IDs: OMIM: 610257; MGI: 1916412; GeneCards: SEC31A
Available structures
PDB	Ortholog search: PDBe RCSB
PDB	List of PDB id codes 3WXA

Gene location (Human)
Chr.	Chromosome 4 (human)
Band	4q21.22	Start	82,818,509 bp
Band	4q21.22	End	82,901,166 bp

Gene location (Mouse)
Chr.	Chromosome 5 (mouse)
Band	5|5 E4	Start	100,509,508 bp
Band	5|5 E4	End	100,564,093 bp
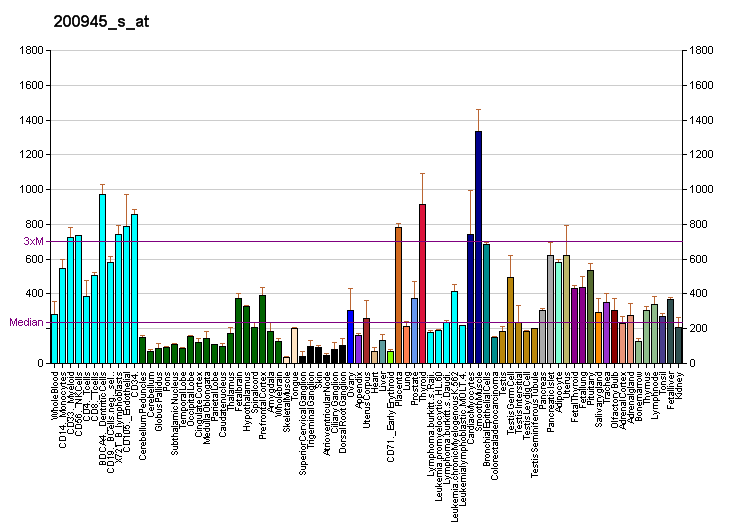

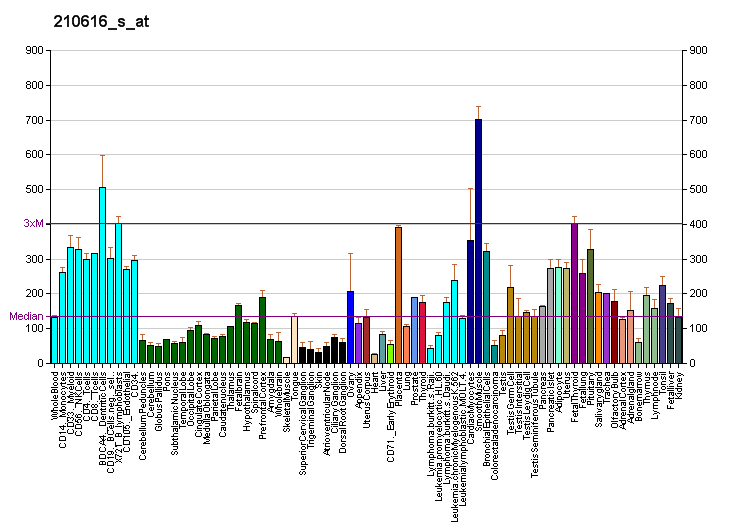
RNA expression pattern
Bgee	Human / Mouse (ortholog); Top expressed in: jejunal mucosa; pancreatic ductal cell; body of pancreas; tibia; Achilles tendon; stromal cell of endometrium; epithelium of colon; periodontal fiber; left ovary; right ovary / Top expressed in: calvaria; tail of embryo; molar; genital tubercle; zygote; duodenum; yolk sac; lip; parotid gland; secondary oocyte; More reference expression data
BioGPS	More reference expression data
Gene ontology
Molecular function	protein binding; calcium-dependent protein binding; structural molecule activity
Cellular component	COPII-coated ER to Golgi transport vesicle; cytoplasmic vesicle; ER to Golgi transport vesicle membrane; intracellular membrane-bounded organelle; perinuclear region of cytoplasm; membrane; endoplasmic reticulum; cytoplasm; endoplasmic reticulum exit site; endoplasmic reticulum membrane; vesicle coat; Golgi membrane; cytosol; COPII vesicle coat
Biological process	IRE1-mediated unfolded protein response; response to calcium ion; COPII vesicle coating; vesicle-mediated transport; antigen processing and presentation of exogenous peptide antigen via MHC class II; protein transport; antigen processing and presentation of peptide antigen via MHC class I; endoplasmic reticulum to Golgi vesicle-mediated transport; COPII-coated vesicle cargo loading; intracellular protein transport; COPII-coated vesicle budding; endoplasmic reticulum organization
Sources:Amigo / QuickGO
Orthologs
Databases	NCBI: entry; OMA: entry
Species	Human	Mouse
Entrez	22872	69162
Ensembl	ENSG00000138674	ENSMUSG00000035325
UniProt	O94979	Q3UPL0
RefSeq (mRNA)	NM_001077206; NM_001077207; NM_001077208; NM_001191049; NM_001300744 NM_001300745; NM_014933; NM_016211; NM_001318119; NM_001318120	NM_026969; NM_001359323; NM_001359332; NM_001359344; NM_001359348 NM_001359349; NM_001359350; NM_001400516; NM_001400517
RefSeq (protein)	NP_001070674; NP_001070675; NP_001070676; NP_001177978; NP_001287673 NP_001287674; NP_001305048; NP_001305049; NP_057295	NP_081245; NP_001346252; NP_001346261; NP_001346273; NP_001346277 NP_001346278; NP_001346279; NP_001387445; NP_001387446
Location (UCSC)	Chr 4: 82.82 – 82.9 Mb	Chr 5: 100.51 – 100.56 Mb
PubMed search
- Wikidata
View/Edit Human	View/Edit Mouse

Protein transport protein Sec31A is a protein that in humans is encoded by the SEC31A gene.

The protein encoded by this gene is similar to the SEC31 protein from yeast. The yeast SEC31 protein is known to be a component of the COPII protein complex, which is responsible for vesicle budding from endoplasmic reticulum (ER). This protein was found to colocalize with SEC13, one of the other components of COPII, in the subcellular structures corresponding to the vesicle transport function. An immunodepletion experiment confirmed that this protein is required for ER-Golgi transport. Alternative splicing results in multiple transcript variants encoding different isoforms.

Halperin-Birk syndrome (HLBKS), a rare autosomal recessive neurodevelopmental disorder, is caused by a null mutation in the SEC31A gene.
