= SEC24C =

Protein-coding gene in the species Homo sapiens

Identifiers
- Aliases: SEC24C, SEC24 homolog C, COPII coat complex component
- External IDs: OMIM: 607185; MGI: 1919746; GeneCards: SEC24C
Available structures
| PDB | Human UniProt search: PDBe RCSB |
| PDB | List of PDB id codes 3EH2 |

Gene location (Human)
| Chr. | Chromosome 10 (human) |
| Band | 10q22.2 | Start | 73,744,372 bp |
| Band | 10q22.2 | End | 73,772,161 bp |

Gene location (Mouse)
| Chr. | Chromosome 14 (mouse) |
| Band | 14|14 A3 | Start | 20,724,376 bp |
| Band | 14|14 A3 | End | 20,744,920 bp |
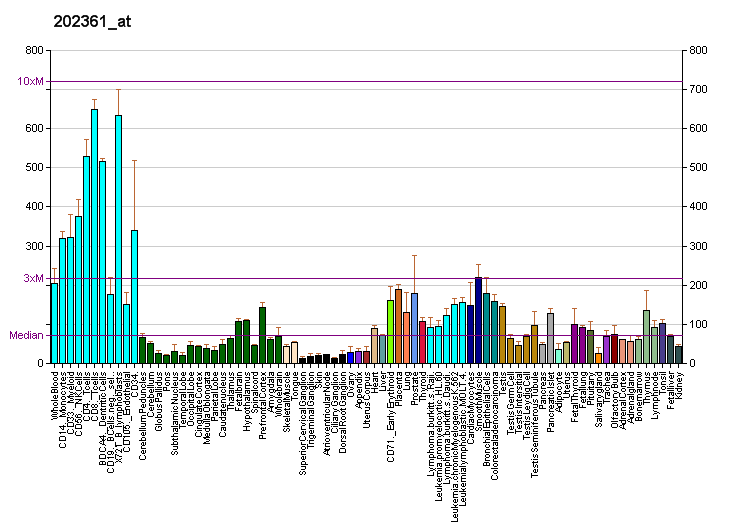
RNA expression pattern
| Bgee | Human / Mouse (ortholog); Top expressed in: mucosa of pharynx; islet of Langerhans; granulocyte; stromal cell of endometrium; anterior pituitary; right adrenal gland; left adrenal gland; right adrenal cortex; left adrenal cortex; smooth muscle tissue / Top expressed in: tail of embryo; genital tubercle; neural layer of retina; spermatocyte; yolk sac; esophagus; muscle of thigh; ventricular zone; granulocyte; lip; More reference expression data |
| BioGPS | More reference expression data |
Gene ontology
| Molecular function | protein binding; SNARE binding; zinc ion binding; metal ion binding |
| Cellular component | cytoplasm; endoplasmic reticulum membrane; membrane; Golgi membrane; endoplasmic reticulum; COPII vesicle coat; cytosol; ER to Golgi transport vesicle membrane; cytoplasmic vesicle |
| Biological process | antigen processing and presentation of exogenous peptide antigen via MHC class II; antigen processing and presentation of peptide antigen via MHC class I; COPII vesicle coating; protein transport; intracellular protein transport; vesicle-mediated transport; in utero embryonic development; endoplasmic reticulum to Golgi vesicle-mediated transport; COPII-coated vesicle cargo loading |
Sources:Amigo / QuickGO
Orthologs
| Databases | NCBI: entry; OMA: entry |
| Species | Human | Mouse |
| Entrez | 9632 | 218811 |
| Ensembl | ENSG00000176986 | ENSMUSG00000039367 |
| UniProt | P53992 | n/a |
| RefSeq (mRNA) | NM_004922; NM_198597 | NM_001168273; NM_172596 |
| RefSeq (protein) | NP_004913; NP_940999 | n/a |
| Location (UCSC) | Chr 10: 73.74 – 73.77 Mb | Chr 14: 20.72 – 20.74 Mb |
| PubMed search |
- Wikidata
| View/Edit Human | View/Edit Mouse |

Protein transport protein Sec24C is a protein that in humans is encoded by the SEC24C gene.

== Function ==
The protein encoded by this gene is a member of the SEC24 subfamily of the SEC23/SEC24 family, which is involved in vesicle trafficking. The encoded protein has similarity to yeast Sec24p component of COPII. COPII is the coat protein complex responsible for vesicle budding from the ER. The product of this gene may play a role in shaping the vesicle, as well as in cargo selection and concentration. Alternatively spliced transcript variants encoding the same protein have been identified.

== Interactions ==
SEC24C has been shown to interact with SEC23A.
