= Cranio-lenticulo-sutural dysplasia =

- Other names: Boyadjiev–Jabs syndrome
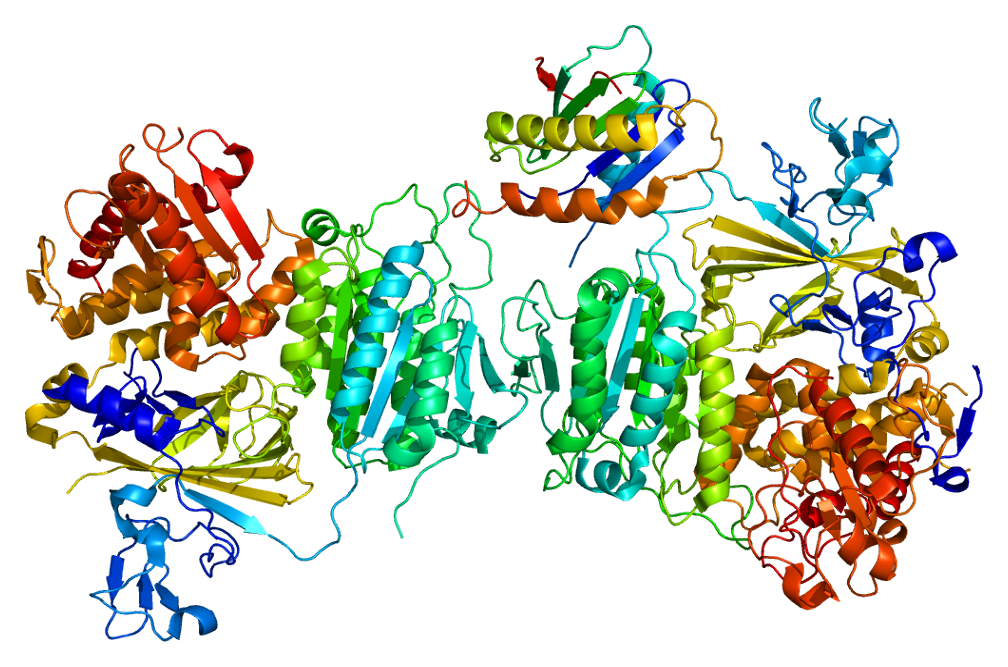
- Protein SEC23A involved in CLSD

Cranio-lenticulo-sutural dysplasia (CLSD, or Boyadjiev–Jabs syndrome) is a neonatal/infancy disease caused by a disorder in the 14th chromosome. It is an autosomal recessive disorder, meaning that both recessive genes must be inherited from each parent in order for the disease to manifest itself. The disease causes a significant dilation of the endoplasmic reticulum in fibroblasts of the host with CLSD. Due to the distension of the endoplasmic reticulum, export of proteins (such as collagen) from the cell is disrupted.

The production of SEC23A protein is involved in the pathway of exporting collagen (the COPII pathway), but a missense mutation causes and underproduction of SEC23A which inhibits the pathway, affecting collagen secretion. This decrease in collagen secretion can lead to the bone defects that are also characteristic of the disease, such as skeletal dysplasia and under-ossification. Decreased collagen in CLSD-affected individuals contributes to improper bone formation, because collagen is a major protein in the extracellular matrix and contributes to its proper mineralization in bones. It has also been hypothesized that there are other defects in the genetic code besides SEC23A that contribute to the disorder.

== Signs and symptoms ==
The following are symptoms characteristic with individuals having the disorder. Individuals may display some, most, or all of these symptoms throughout the course of their life, though symptoms may vary with each patient.

- Abnormal hair (coarse, thick, brittle)
- Calvarial hypomineralization (soft skull)
- Y-shaped cataracts by 1–2 years of age
- Skeletal defects
- Hypertelorism (wide-set eyes)
- Facial dysmorphisms
- Late-closing fontanels
- Abnormal accumulation of proteins in the endoplasmic reticulum
- Scoliosis
- Broad forehead, nose
- Missing, small teeth or abnormal teeth positioning
- Poor skull calcification
- Flat foot
- Motor delay
- Abnormal vertebrae
- Prominent forehead and brow
- High nose bridge
- Capillary hemangioma
- Delayed tooth eruption
- Long upper lip groove
- Large mouth
- High arched palate
- Narrow hips and rib cage
- Thin lips
- Narrow and sloping shoulders
- Hyperpigmentation
- Hyperextensible joints

Onset of the disease is in neonatal development and infancy, and symptoms tend to become evident soon after birth.

== Cause ==
CLSD is caused by a missense mutation in the 14q13-q21 region of Chromosome 14, where the amino acid phenylalanine is mistranslated and replaced with leucine. Amino acid sequences are encoded in the DNA of each cell in an organism, which is transcribed into RNA and then translated in a ribosome (in this case, the ribosome is attached to the endoplasmic reticulum) which produces a chain of amino acids which makes up a protein. If an amino acid sequence isn't correct, it won't make a functional protein. The missense mutation in CLSD causes an inactivation of the SEC23A protein, which is responsible for closure of the COPII pathway.

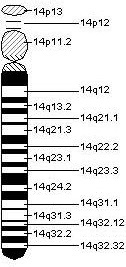
Chromosome 14, the chromosome affected by CLSD.

== Mechanism ==
The main function of the SEC23A protein is to hydrolyze or break down a guanosine triphosphate (GTP) molecule bound to the SAR1A protein at the start of the COPII pathway. The energy released from the breaking of the GTP bond provides energy necessary to undergo another reaction. This triggers uncoating of the vesicle (a membrane bound carrying compartment for molecules) containing a secretory protein destined for packaging in the Golgi apparatus of the cell. Uncoating the vesicle exposes SNARE proteins which are needed for the vesicle to bind to the membrane site on the endoplasmic reticulum. A mutation in the SEC23A gene prevents the vesicle from uncoating so it will not bind to the receptor site on the endoplasmic reticulum to be released into the cytoplasm for transport to the Golgi apparatus. Thus, the vesicles will accumulate in the endoplasmic reticulum, causing it to become enlarged or distended. Ultimately, this causes the craniofacial symptoms present in patients with CLSD. This is probably due to abnormal secretion of collagen and possibly other secretory proteins which have accumulated in the endoplasmic reticulum. Collagen is responsible to for skull ossification, among other things.

== Diagnosis ==
=== Classification ===
- Rare developmental anomaly during embryogenesis
- Rare genetic disease
- Rare bone disease

== Treatment ==
Treatment for CLSD is largely focused on treating the symptoms of the disorder, because it is still in the early stages of research. Symptomatic treatment is also the only option due to the genetic nature of the disorder. Treatment may include surgeries to correct facial and cranial dysmorphisms or therapy sessions to help alleviate behavioral abnormalities associated with the disorder.

== Prognosis ==
Though the children affected with CLSD will have problems throughout life, the treatment for this disease thus far is symptomatic. However, prognosis is good; at the time of the most recently published articles, identified children were still alive at over 4 years of age. Mutant proteins still maintain some residual activity, allowing for the release of some collagen, but still form an extremely distended endoplasmic reticulum.

== Frequency ==
- Birth defects with symptoms related to CLSD are estimated to affect one in every 500 to 1,000 babies in the United States of America
- Recommended that CLSD is evaluated in all patients with late-closing fontanels and hypertelorism
- Recent case found in a caucasian male with a SEC23 inherited mutation from the father combined with another unknown mutation that leads to the symptoms of CLSD despite a healthy gene inherited from the mother
  - Measurement of parental and patient endoplasmic reticulums show distention in both the father and the child, but not the mother as compared to a control measurement. The child was significantly more distended than the father and the mother.
- Frequency of the disorder may be greater than once thought, and may be linked more closely to all cases of late-closing fontanels and hypertelorism

== History ==
Cranio-lenticulo-sutural dysplasia was first discovered by Simeon Boyadjiev Boyd, chief of the Section of Genetics at UC Davis Children's Hospital, in 2003. CLSD was found a consanguineous (sharing a common ancestor) Saudi Arabian family of Bedouin descent. The children who were affected inherited the defective gene from both of their parents (Boyadjiev, 1193).

A Caucasian male was also found to have symptoms of the disease, but possessed only one defective chromosome. Measurements of the endoplasmic reticulums of his mother and father showed that the mother had a normal phenotype, the father had a slightly distended endoplasmic reticulum, and the affected son had an endoplasmic reticulum distended to a much greater extent. Because of the normal measurements obtained from the mother, it was concluded that the father was responsible for the son's symptoms and was hypothesized that there was another mutation on chromosome 14 that caused the disease to manifest itself without a secondary disease carrying chromosome he would have inherited from his mother.

It is associated with a mutation changing the translation of phenylalanine to leucine in SEC23A.

== Current research ==
Taking advantage of the transparent embryos of zebrafish, these organisms were bred with the SEC23A mutation and observed for developmental issues. These can give a clue to symptoms that cannot be observed in the womb of a human. Observations include:

- expression in developing head cartilage
- expression in all main neurocranial and viscerocranial cartilages of the head
- scapulocoracoid and postcoracoid processes of the pectoral fin and distal edge of endoskeletal disc
- shortened overall body length
