= Hypobetalipoproteinemia =

- Specialty: Endocrinology

Hypobetalipoproteinemia is a disorder consisting of low levels of LDL cholesterol or apolipoprotein B, below the 5th percentile. The patient can have hypobetalipoproteinemia and simultaneously have high levels of HDL cholesterol.

Notably, in people who do not have the genetic disorder hypobetalipoproteinemia, a very low cholesterol level (less than 100 mg/dl) may be a marker for poor nutrition, wasting disease, cancer, hyperthyroidism, and liver disease. In 1997 a study showed that Japanese Centenarians had tenfold increase of hypobetalipoproteinemia compared with controls.

== Causes ==
One form is thought to be caused by mutated apolipoprotein B.

Another form is associated with microsomal triglyceride transfer protein which causes abetalipoproteinemia.

A third form, chylomicron retention disease (CRD), is associated with SARA2.

== Diagnosis ==
Typically in hypobetalipoproteinemia, plasma cholesterol levels will be around 80–120 mg/dL, LDL cholesterol will be around 50–80 mg/dL.

== Treatment ==
Early high doses of vitamin E in infants and children has shown to be effective.
