= ANKRD13C =

Protein-coding gene in humans

Identifiers
- Aliases: ANKRD13C, dJ677H15.3, ankyrin repeat domain 13C
- External IDs: OMIM: 615125; MGI: 2139746; GeneCards: ANKRD13C

Gene location (Human)
Chr.	Chromosome 1 (human)
Band	1p31.1	Start	70,258,999 bp
Band	1p31.1	End	70,354,734 bp

Gene location (Mouse)
Chr.	Chromosome 3 (mouse)
Band	3|3 H4	Start	157,947,239 bp
Band	3|3 H4	End	158,008,034 bp
RNA expression pattern
Bgee	Human / Mouse (ortholog); Top expressed in: Achilles tendon; epithelium of colon; pancreatic epithelial cell; tibia; endothelial cell; corpus callosum; islet of Langerhans; palpebral conjunctiva; parietal pleura; amniotic fluid / Top expressed in: saccule; otic placode; human kidney; right kidney; proximal tubule; subiculum; olfactory tubercle; blood; epithelium of stomach; lacrimal gland; More reference expression data
BioGPS	n/a
Gene ontology
Molecular function	signaling receptor binding
Cellular component	perinuclear region of cytoplasm; endoplasmic reticulum membrane; membrane; endoplasmic reticulum
Biological process	protein retention in ER lumen; regulation of anoikis
Sources:Amigo / QuickGO
Orthologs
Databases	NCBI: entry; OMA: entry
Species	Human	Mouse
Entrez	81573	433667
Ensembl	ENSG00000118454	ENSMUSG00000039988
UniProt	Q8N6S4	Q3UX43
RefSeq (mRNA)	NM_030816	NM_001013806; NM_001359909
RefSeq (protein)	NP_110443	NP_001013828; NP_001346838
Location (UCSC)	Chr 1: 70.26 – 70.35 Mb	Chr 3: 157.95 – 158.01 Mb
PubMed search
- Wikidata
View/Edit Human	View/Edit Mouse

Ankyrin repeat domain-containing protein 13C is a protein that in humans is encoded by the ANKRD13C gene.

== Protein interactions ==
ANKRD13C is predicted to interact with Transmembrane Protein Domain 255A (TMEM255A).
