= Irun Cohen =

Irun Cohen (Hebrew: עירון כהן; born September 1, 1937, in Chicago, Illinois) is an immunologist at the Weizmann Institute of Science, Israel. In 1968, he joined the research staff at the Weizmann Institute of Science in Israel after completing his residency at Johns Hopkins Hospital.

His contributions to immunology includes, in 1989, the development of the theory of the immunological homunculus, a hypothetical self-image used by the immune system to govern its responses. The bulk of Professor Cohen's work is in the search for treatment for autoimmune disease. Throughout his career he has collaborated with scientists of all nationalities, including the Cuban immunologist Enrique Montero.

== Early life and education ==
Cohen studied philosophy at Northwestern University obtaining a Bachelor of Arts in 1959. He studied medicine at Northwestern Medical School obtaining a degree in medicine in 1963.
