= SEC24D =

Protein-coding gene in the species Homo sapiens

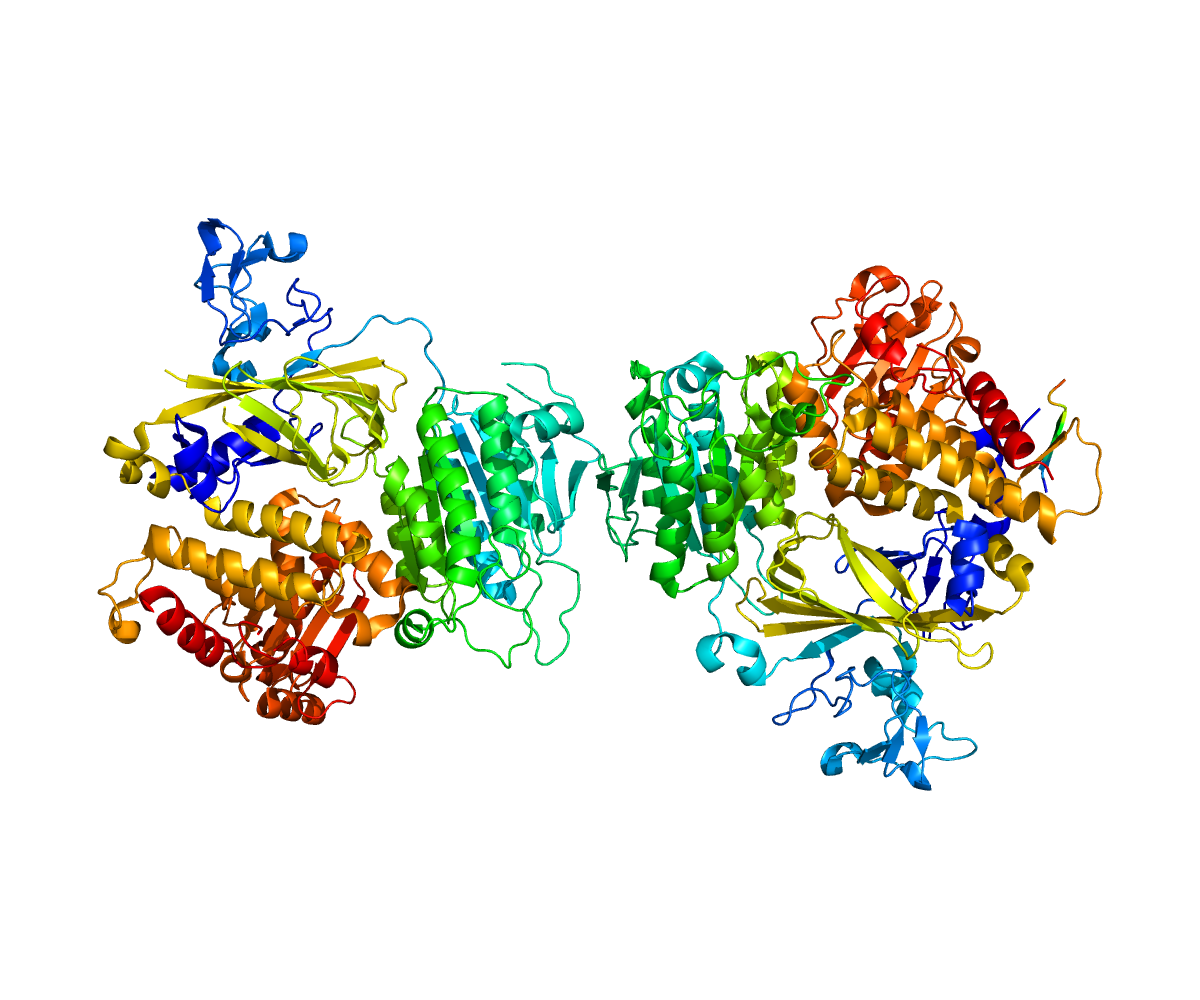

Identifiers
- Aliases: SEC24D, CLCRP2, SEC24 homolog D, COPII coat complex component
- External IDs: OMIM: 607186; MGI: 1916858; GeneCards: SEC24D
Available structures
PDB	Human UniProt search: PDBe RCSB
PDB	List of PDB id codes 3EFO, 3EG9

Gene location (Human)
Chr.	Chromosome 4 (human)
Band	4q26	Start	118,722,823 bp
Band	4q26	End	118,838,683 bp

Gene location (Mouse)
Chr.	Chromosome 3 (mouse)
Band	3|3 G1	Start	123,061,104 bp
Band	3|3 G1	End	123,159,290 bp
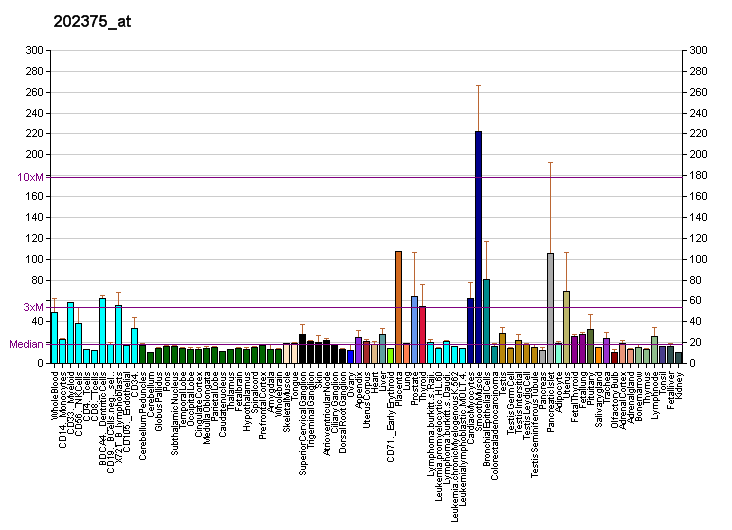
RNA expression pattern
Bgee	Human / Mouse (ortholog); Top expressed in: stromal cell of endometrium; jejunal mucosa; islet of Langerhans; ascending aorta; right coronary artery; Descending thoracic aorta; right lobe of liver; smooth muscle tissue; body of pancreas; tibia / Top expressed in: yolk sac; calvaria; ascending aorta; aortic valve; seminal vesicula; duodenum; epithelium of small intestine; islet of Langerhans; jejunum; umbilical cord; More reference expression data
BioGPS	More reference expression data
Gene ontology
Molecular function	protein binding; SNARE binding; zinc ion binding; metal ion binding
Cellular component	cytoplasm; endoplasmic reticulum membrane; membrane; Golgi membrane; endoplasmic reticulum; COPII vesicle coat; cytosol; ER to Golgi transport vesicle membrane; cytoplasmic vesicle
Biological process	antigen processing and presentation of exogenous peptide antigen via MHC class II; antigen processing and presentation of peptide antigen via MHC class I; in utero embryonic development; COPII vesicle coating; protein transport; intracellular protein transport; vesicle-mediated transport; endoplasmic reticulum to Golgi vesicle-mediated transport; COPII-coated vesicle cargo loading
Sources:Amigo / QuickGO
Orthologs
Databases	NCBI: entry; OMA: entry
Species	Human	Mouse
Entrez	9871	69608
Ensembl	ENSG00000150961	ENSMUSG00000039234
UniProt	O94855	n/a
RefSeq (mRNA)	NM_014822; NM_001318066	NM_027135
RefSeq (protein)	NP_001304995; NP_055637	n/a
Location (UCSC)	Chr 4: 118.72 – 118.84 Mb	Chr 3: 123.06 – 123.16 Mb
PubMed search
- Wikidata
View/Edit Human	View/Edit Mouse

Protein transport protein Sec24D is a protein that in humans is encoded by the SEC24D gene.

The protein encoded by this gene is a member of the SEC24 subfamily of the SEC23/SEC24 family, which is involved in vesicle trafficking. The encoded protein has similarity to yeast Sec24p component of COPII. COPII is the coat protein complex responsible for vesicle budding from the ER. The role of this gene product is implicated in the shaping of the vesicle, and also in cargo selection and concentration.
