= BET1 =

Protein-coding gene in the species Homo sapiens

Identifiers
- Aliases: BET1, HBet1 golgi vesicular membrane trafficking protein
- External IDs: OMIM: 605456; MGI: 1343104; GeneCards: BET1
Available structures
PDB	Ortholog search: PDBe RCSB
PDB	List of PDB id codes 3EGX

Gene location (Human)
Chr.	Chromosome 7 (human)
Band	7q21.3	Start	93,962,762 bp
Band	7q21.3	End	94,004,382 bp

Gene location (Mouse)
Chr.	Chromosome 6 (mouse)
Band	6|6 A1	Start	4,076,899 bp
Band	6|6 A1	End	4,086,972 bp
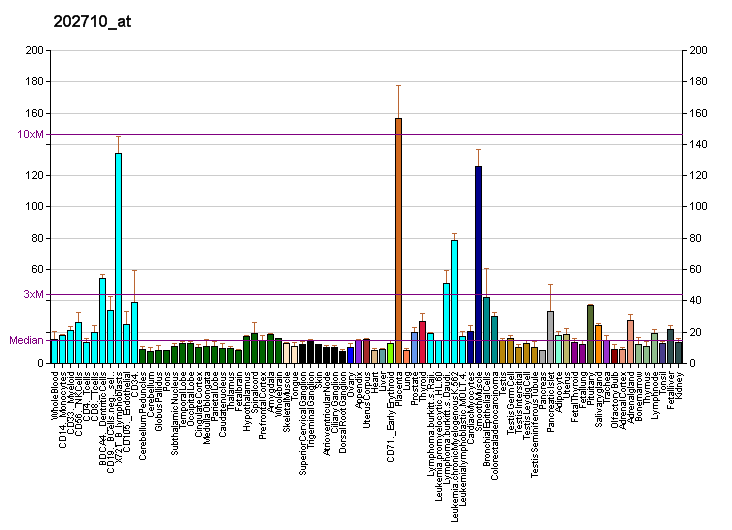
RNA expression pattern
Bgee	Human / Mouse (ortholog); Top expressed in: body of pancreas; Achilles tendon; placenta; endometrium; corpus epididymis; anterior pituitary; monocyte; right adrenal gland; right adrenal cortex; left adrenal gland / Top expressed in: gastrula; decidua; right kidney; ventricular zone; lip; seminal vesicula; lacrimal gland; otic placode; morula; parotid gland; More reference expression data
BioGPS	More reference expression data
Gene ontology
Molecular function	protein binding; syntaxin binding; SNAP receptor activity
Cellular component	integral component of membrane; Golgi apparatus; endoplasmic reticulum membrane; membrane; Golgi cisterna; Golgi membrane; cis-Golgi network; transport vesicle; SNARE complex; endoplasmic reticulum; endoplasmic reticulum-Golgi intermediate compartment membrane; Golgi trans cisterna; integral component of Golgi membrane
Biological process	vesicle fusion with Golgi apparatus; endoplasmic reticulum to Golgi vesicle-mediated transport; COPII vesicle coating; protein transport; vesicle-mediated transport; transport
Sources:Amigo / QuickGO
Orthologs
Databases	NCBI: entry; OMA: entry
Species	Human	Mouse
Entrez	10282	12068
Ensembl	ENSG00000105829	ENSMUSG00000032757
UniProt	O15155	O35623
RefSeq (mRNA)	NM_005868; NM_001317739	NM_009748
RefSeq (protein)	NP_001304668; NP_005859	NP_033878
Location (UCSC)	Chr 7: 93.96 – 94 Mb	Chr 6: 4.08 – 4.09 Mb
PubMed search
- Wikidata
View/Edit Human	View/Edit Mouse

BET1 homolog is a protein that in humans is encoded by the BET1 gene.

This gene encodes a golgi-associated membrane protein that participates in vesicular transport from the endoplasmic reticulum (ER) to the Golgi complex. The encoded protein functions as a soluble N-ethylaleimide-sensitive factor attachment protein receptor and may be involved in the docking of ER-derived vesicles with the cis-Golgi membrane. Alternatively spliced transcript variants encoding different isoforms have been described but their full-length nature has not been determined.
