= SEC13 =

Protein-coding gene in the species Homo sapiens

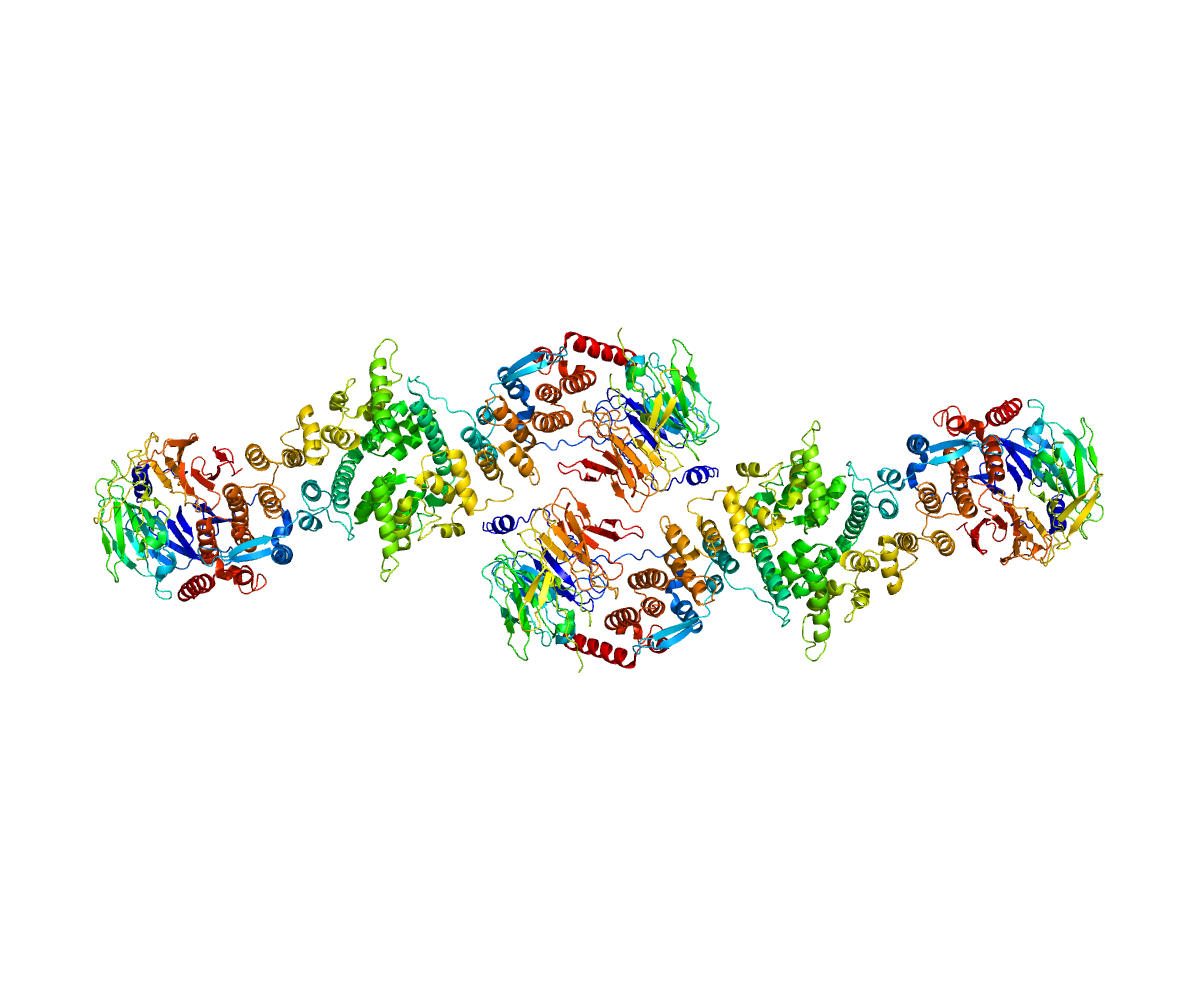

Identifiers
- Aliases: SEC13, D3S1231E, SEC13L1, SEC13R, npp-20, SEC13 homolog, nuclear pore and COPII coat complex component
- External IDs: OMIM: 600152; MGI: 99832; GeneCards: SEC13
Available structures
PDB	Ortholog search: PDBe RCSB
PDB	List of PDB id codes 3BG0, 3BG1, 5A9Q

Gene location (Human)
Chr.	Chromosome 3 (human)
Band	3p25.3	Start	10,293,131 bp
Band	3p25.3	End	10,321,112 bp

Gene location (Mouse)
Chr.	Chromosome 6 (mouse)
Band	6 E3|6 52.84 cM	Start	113,705,023 bp
Band	6 E3|6 52.84 cM	End	113,717,704 bp
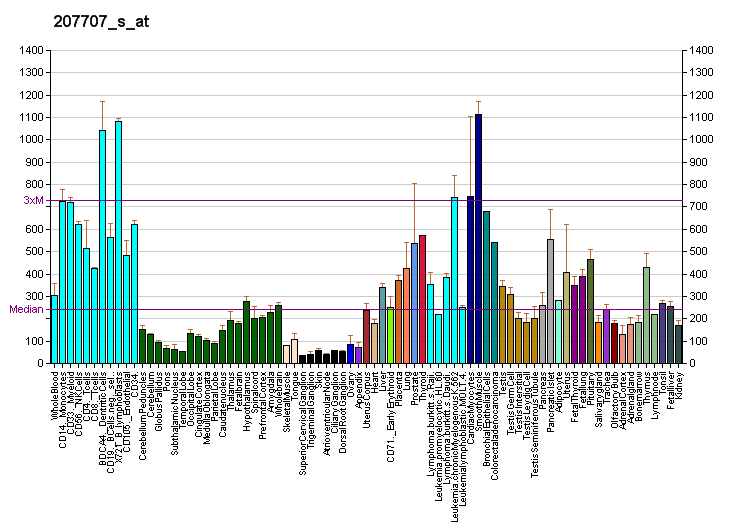
RNA expression pattern
Bgee	Human / Mouse (ortholog); Top expressed in: stromal cell of endometrium; oocyte; pituitary gland; beta cell; anterior pituitary; duodenum; jejunal mucosa; parotid gland; cartilage tissue; tibia / Top expressed in: molar; epithelium of small intestine; seminal vesicula; otic placode; Ileal epithelium; mandibular prominence; maxillary prominence; endocardial cushion; neural tube; duodenum; More reference expression data
BioGPS	More reference expression data
Gene ontology
Molecular function	protein binding; identical protein binding; structural molecule activity
Cellular component	endoplasmic reticulum membrane; intracellular membrane-bounded organelle; membrane; nuclear envelope; nuclear pore; nucleoplasm; GATOR2 complex; nuclear pore outer ring; endoplasmic reticulum; ER to Golgi transport vesicle membrane; extracellular exosome; cytoplasmic vesicle; nucleus; kinetochore; Golgi membrane; lysosome; lysosomal membrane; COPII vesicle coat; cytosol; host cell
Biological process	mRNA transport; antigen processing and presentation of exogenous peptide antigen via MHC class II; antigen processing and presentation of peptide antigen via MHC class I; COPII vesicle coating; protein transport; intracellular protein transport; vesicle-mediated transport; positive regulation of TOR signaling; sister chromatid cohesion; COPII-coated vesicle cargo loading; transport; protein exit from endoplasmic reticulum; COPII-coated vesicle budding; positive regulation of TORC1 signaling; regulation of glycolytic process; mRNA export from nucleus; tRNA export from nucleus; viral process; viral transcription; regulation of gene silencing by miRNA; intracellular transport of virus; regulation of cellular response to heat
Sources:Amigo / QuickGO
Orthologs
Databases	NCBI: entry; OMA: entry
Species	Human	Mouse
Entrez	6396	110379
Ensembl	ENSG00000157020	ENSMUSG00000030298
UniProt	P55735	Q9D1M0
RefSeq (mRNA)	NM_001136026; NM_001136232; NM_001278946; NM_030673; NM_183352	NM_024206
RefSeq (protein)	NP_001129498; NP_001129704; NP_001265875; NP_109598; NP_899195	NP_077168
Location (UCSC)	Chr 3: 10.29 – 10.32 Mb	Chr 6: 113.71 – 113.72 Mb
PubMed search
- Wikidata
View/Edit Human	View/Edit Mouse

Protein SEC13 homolog is a protein that in humans is encoded by the SEC13 gene.

The protein encoded by this gene belongs to the SEC13 family of WD-repeat proteins. It has similarity to the yeast SEC13 and SEC31 proteins, which are required for vesicle biogenesis from the endoplasmic reticulum during the transport of proteins.
