= Congenital dyserythropoietic anemia type II =

- Other names: Hereditary erythroblastic multinuclearity with positive acidified serum lysis test (abbr HEMPAS)
- Specialty: Hematology

Congenital dyserythropoietic anemia type II (CDA II), or hereditary erythroblastic multinuclearity with positive acidified serum lysis test (HEMPAS) is a rare genetic anemia in humans characterized by hereditary erythroblastic multinuclearity with positive acidified serum lysis test.

== Genetics ==
CDA type II is caused by mutations in the SEC23B gene. This gene provides instructions for making a protein that is involved in the transport of other proteins within cells. During the development of red blood cells, this protein may help ensure that proteins are transported to the areas where they are needed. Researchers are working to determine how mutations in the SEC23B gene lead to the signs and symptoms of CDA type II.

Analyses of CDA II erythrocyte membranes showed that the band 3 glycoprotein is underglycosylated. An aberrant glycosylation pattern is seen in the polylactosamine carbohydrates which are normally attached to the band 3 and band 4.5 glycoproteins. The polylactosamines are, however, accumulated in the form of glycolipids. Therefore a genetic factor in CDA II appears to block the glycosylation of protein acceptors and shift these carbohydrates to the lipid acceptors. Structural analysis of CDA II band 3 carbohydrates identified truncated hybrid-type oligosaccharides and suggests that the Golgi glycosylation enzyme(s), alpha-mannosidase II or N-acetylglycosaminyltransferase II is defective in CDA II.

Type	OMIM	Gene	Locus
CDAN2	224100	SEC23B	20q11.2

== Diagnosis ==
The anemia associated with CDA type II can range from mild to severe, and most affected individuals have jaundice, enlargement of the liver and spleen (hepatosplenomegaly), and the formation of hard deposits in the gallbladder called bilirubin gallstones. This form of the disorder is usually diagnosed in adolescence or early adulthood. An abnormal buildup of iron typically occurs after age 20, leading to complications including heart disease, diabetes, and cirrhosis.

== Treatment ==
Treatment consists of frequent blood transfusions and chelation therapy. Potential cures include bone marrow transplantation and gene therapy.

== See also ==
- Congenital dyserythropoietic anemia
- Hemoglobinopathy
- List of hematologic conditions
- Thalassemia
