= SEC31 =

Protein

SEC31 is a protein which in yeast promotes the formation of COPII transport vesicles from the Endoplasmic Reticulum (ER). The coat has two main functions, the physical deformation of the endoplasmic reticulum membrane into vesicles and the selection of cargo molecules.

Its human homologs are SEC31A and SEC31B.
