= Birk–Barel syndrome =

- Other names: Intellectual disability-hypotonia-facial dysmorphism syndrome, KCNK9 Imprinting Syndrome
- Birk–Barel syndrome has an autosomal dominant pattern of inheritance.
- Specialty: Medical genetics
- Symptoms: Intellectual disability, hypotonia, and characteristic dysmorphia, hyperactivity, and feeding difficulties.
- Diagnostic method: DNA testing.

Birk–Barel syndrome is a rare genetic disorder associated with the KCNK9 gene. Signs and symptoms include intellectual disability, hypotonia, hyperactivity, and syndromic facies.

Due to imprinting, mutations in the maternal copy of KCNK9 cause the condition, while mutations in the paternal copy do not. As such, this condition can only be inherited from the mother.

The Inhibition of histone deacetylation rescues phenotype in a mouse model of Birk–Barel intellectual disability syndrome.

== Signs and symptoms ==
Birk–Barel syndrome is often expressed in the form of moderate to severe intellectual disability, hypotonia, and characteristic dysmorphia. Hyperactivity in the patient, along with severe feeding difficulties as an infant and even until teenage years are common. However, most notable are the characteristic dysmorphic facial features of patients. Patients often display narrow, elongated faces with reduced facial movements due to muscle atrophy. Characteristics can also include protruding ears, flared eyebrows, a high, narrow nasal bridge, and an open mouth appearance with a high-arched palate and dysphonic screech.

== Diagnosis ==
Birk–Barel syndrome is caused by a heterozygous mutation on the KCNK9 gene. Therefore, doctors and geneticists generally rely on DNA testing such as whole-exome sequencing to identify the location of the mutation and diagnose the disease. Because Birk–Barel syndrome is autosomal dominant with paternal imprinting, family members are also tested and their genomes are sequenced.

== Management and treatment ==
Because Birk–Barel syndrome is so rare, there is no standardized treatment protocol or guidelines for affected individuals. Specific nonsteroidal inflammatory drugs (flufenamic acid and mefenamic acid) have been used on children with the G236R variant. This treatment is only aided by anecdotal evidence. Generally, Birk–Barel syndrome is treated based on the symptoms that an individual shows. Pediatricians, pediatric neurologists, speech pathologists, specialists who diagnose and treat disorders of the stomach and intestines (gastroenterologists), psychiatrists, and other healthcare professionals may all work together to provide the best treatment for the patient.

== Genetics ==
- Inheritance Pattern
  - This syndrome is characterized by autosomal dominant inheritance with paternal imprinting.
- Gene Involved
  - KCNK9 gene on chromosome 8
- Type of mutation
  - Missense mutation in the maternal copy of the KCNK9 gene
- Location on Chromosome
  - 8q24.3 --> 8th chromosome, long arm, band 24, sub-band 3
- Effect on Gene Product
  - The mutation causes a complete loss of the current in the potassium channel.
- Spectrum of disease caused by genetics
  - All of the individuals have a missense mutation but the location of the missense mutation determines the severity of the syndrome because some locations may be more detrimental to amino acid and proteins compared to others.

== Epidemiology ==
Birk–Barel syndrome is an extremely rare syndrome with only a few documented cases around the world. Because it often goes undiagnosed or unreported, the genetic frequency of the mutation and prevalence of the syndrome remains unknown, making Birk–Barel syndrome's impact on the population a mystery.
