= SEC24A =

Protein-coding gene in the species Homo sapiens

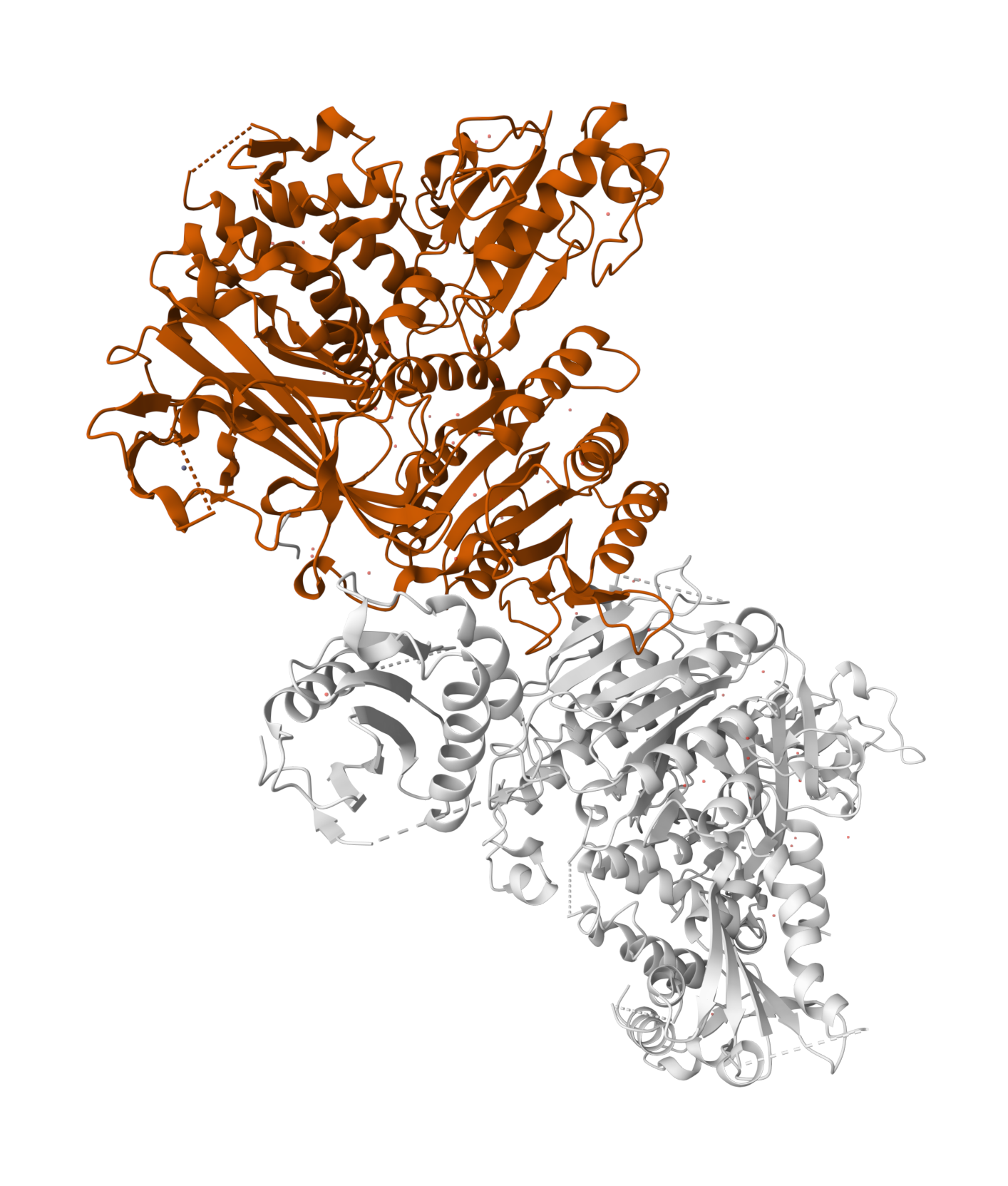

Identifiers
- Aliases: SEC24A, SEC24 homolog A, COPII coat complex component
- External IDs: OMIM: 607183; MGI: 1924621; GeneCards: SEC24A
Available structures
PDB	Ortholog search: PDBe RCSB
PDB	List of PDB id codes 2NUP, 2NUT, 3EGD, 3EGX

Gene location (Human)
Chr.	Chromosome 5 (human)
Band	5q31.1	Start	134,648,785 bp
Band	5q31.1	End	134,727,909 bp

Gene location (Mouse)
Chr.	Chromosome 11 (mouse)
Band	11|11 B1.3	Start	51,583,091 bp
Band	11|11 B1.3	End	51,654,461 bp
RNA expression pattern
Bgee	Human / Mouse (ortholog); Top expressed in: jejunal mucosa; mucosa of sigmoid colon; oocyte; cartilage tissue; parotid gland; oral cavity; secondary oocyte; Epithelium of choroid plexus; tail of epididymis; tibia / Top expressed in: epithelium of small intestine; seminal vesicula; left lobe of liver; migratory enteric neural crest cell; salivary gland; lacrimal gland; submandibular gland; body of femur; lobe of prostate; cumulus cell; More reference expression data
BioGPS	n/a
Gene ontology
Molecular function	protein binding; zinc ion binding; metal ion binding
Cellular component	cytoplasm; endoplasmic reticulum membrane; membrane; Golgi membrane; endoplasmic reticulum; COPII vesicle coat; cytosol; ER to Golgi transport vesicle membrane; cytoplasmic vesicle
Biological process	antigen processing and presentation of exogenous peptide antigen via MHC class II; antigen processing and presentation of peptide antigen via MHC class I; COPII vesicle coating; positive regulation of protein secretion; protein transport; intracellular protein transport; vesicle-mediated transport; endoplasmic reticulum to Golgi vesicle-mediated transport; COPII-coated vesicle cargo loading; cholesterol homeostasis
Sources:Amigo / QuickGO
Orthologs
Databases	NCBI: entry; OMA: entry
Species	Human	Mouse
Entrez	10802	77371
Ensembl	ENSG00000113615	ENSMUSG00000036391
UniProt	O95486	Q3U2P1
RefSeq (mRNA)	NM_001252231; NM_021982	NM_001290785; NM_175255
RefSeq (protein)	NP_001239160; NP_068817	NP_001277714; NP_780464
Location (UCSC)	Chr 5: 134.65 – 134.73 Mb	Chr 11: 51.58 – 51.65 Mb
PubMed search
- Wikidata
View/Edit Human	View/Edit Mouse

SEC24 family, member A (S. cerevisiae) is a protein that in humans is encoded by the SEC24A gene. The protein belongs to a protein family that are homologous to yeast Sec24. It is a component of coat protein II (COPII)-coated vesicles that mediate protein transport from the endoplasmic reticulum.
