= COPII =

Cell structure involved in protein transport

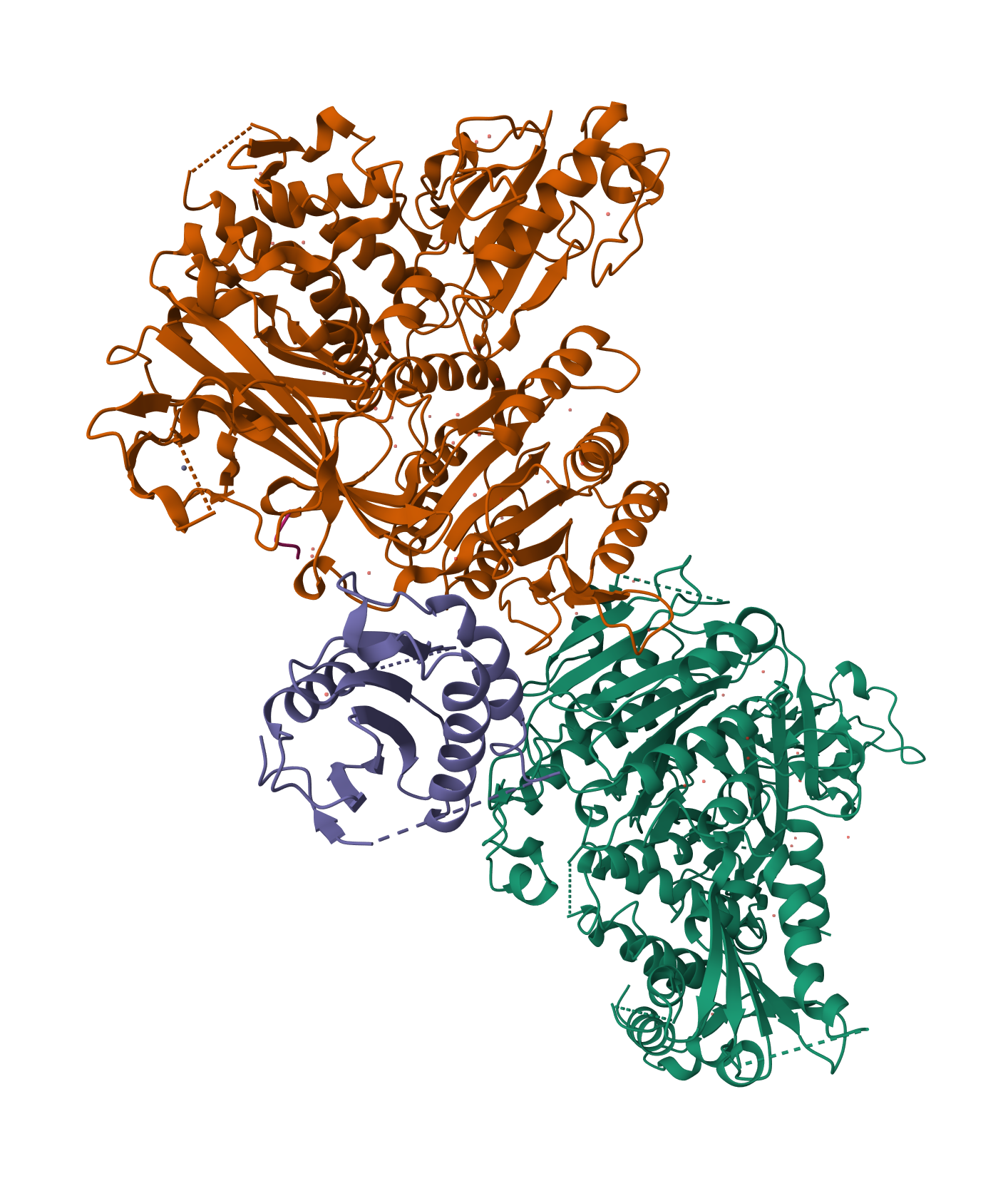
dark green: Protein transport protein Sec23A, Homo sapiens, Gene names: SEC23A brown: Protein transport protein Sec24A, Homo sapiens, Gene names: SEC24A blue: Vesicle-trafficking protein SEC22b, Mus musculus, Gene names: SEC22B, Sec22l1 pink: C-terminal sorting motif ILE-ILE, Homo sapiens

The coat protein complex II, or COPII, is a group of proteins that facilitate the formation of vesicles to transport proteins from the endoplasmic reticulum to the Golgi apparatus or endoplasmic-reticulum–Golgi intermediate compartment. This process is termed anterograde transport, in contrast to the retrograde transport associated with the COPI complex. COPII is assembled in two parts: first an inner layer of Sar1, Sec23, and Sec24 forms; then the inner coat is surrounded by an outer lattice of Sec13 and Sec31.

== Function ==
The COPII coat is responsible for the formation of vesicles from the endoplasmic reticulum (ER). These vesicles transport cargo proteins to the Golgi apparatus (in yeast) or the endoplasmic-reticulum-Golgi intermediate compartment (ERGIC, in mammals).

Coat assembly is initiated when the cytosolic Ras GTPase Sar1 is activated by its guanine nucleotide exchange factor Sec12. Activated Sar1-GTP inserts itself into the ER membrane, binding preferentially to areas of membrane curvature. As Sar1-GTP inserts into the membrane, it recruits Sec23 and Sec24 to make up the inner cage. Once the inner coat is assembled, the outer coat proteins Sec13 and Sec31 are recruited to the budding vesicle. Hydrolysis of the Sar1 GTP to GDP promotes disassembly of the coat.

Some proteins are found to be responsible for selectively packaging cargos into COPII vesicles. More recent research suggests the Sec23/Sec24-Sar1 complex participates in cargo selection. For example, Erv29p in Saccharomyces cerevisiae is found to be necessary for packaging glycosylated pro-α-factor.

Sec24 proteins recognize various cargo proteins, packaging them into the budding vesicles.

== Structure ==
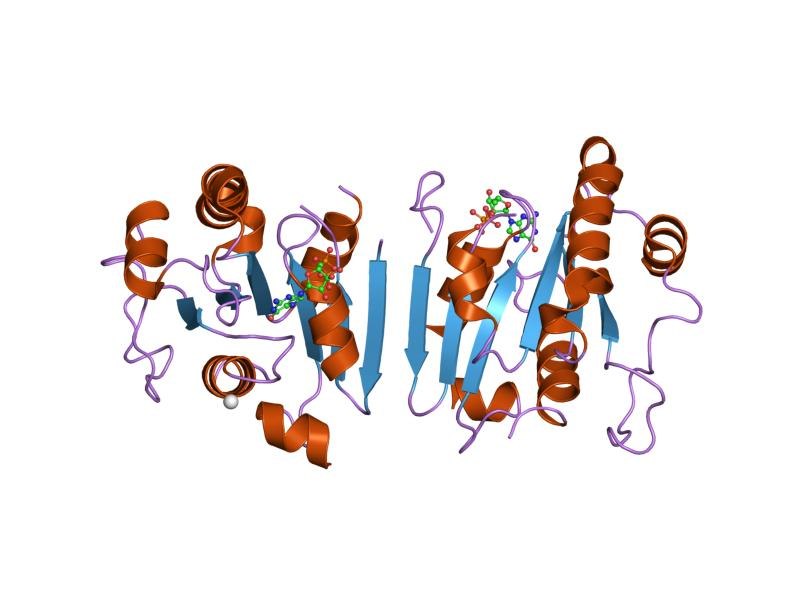
Human Sar1A bound to GDP

The COPII coat consists of an inner layer – a flexible meshwork of Sar1, Sec23, and Sec24 – and an outer layer made of Sec13 and Sec31. Sar1 resembles other Ras-family GTPases, with a core of six beta strands flanked by three alpha helices, and two flexible "switch domains". Unlike other Ras GTPases, Sar1 inserts into membranes via an N-terminal helix (rather than myristoylation or prenylation).

These coat proteins are necessary but insufficient to direct or dock the vesicle to the correct target membrane. SNARE, cargo, and other proteins are also needed for these processes to occur.

Pre-budding complex (composed of Sar1-GTP and Sec23/24) recruits the flexible Sec13p/31p complex, characterized by polymerization of the Sec13/31 complex with other Sec13/31 complexes to form a cuboctahedron with a broader lattice than its Clathrin vesicle analog. The formation of the cuboctahedron deforms the ER membrane and detaches the COPII vesicle (alongside cargo proteins and v-SNAREs), completing the COPII vesicle budding process.

== Regulation ==
The signal(s) that triggers Sec12 to initiate COPII assembly remains unclear, though some regulators of coat formation are now known. The frequency of COPII formation is regulated in part by Sec16A and Tango1 proteins, likely by concentrating Sec12 in a given location, so it can more efficiently activate Sar1.

== Evolution ==
In mammals there are two Sar1 genes: SAR1A and SAR1B (SAR1B was previously known as SARA2). In cultured mammalian cells the two Sar1 genes appear redundant; however, in animals SAR1B is uniquely required for the formation of large (over 1 micrometer across) COPII-coated vesicles.

Similarly, mammals express two Sec23 genes: SEC23A and SEC23B. The two Sec23 isoforms have identical function but are expressed in different body tissues. Both Sec23 proteins can interact with any of the four Sec24 proteins: SEC24A, SEC24B, SEC24C, and SEC24D.

== Role in disease ==
Lethal or pathogenic variants of most COPII proteins have been described. Loss of Sar1B in mice results in death soon after birth. In humans, inheriting two copies of certain SAR1B variants results in Chylomicron retention disease, and loss of Sar1B causes a combination of chylomicron retention disease and the neuromuscular disorder Marinesco–Sjögren syndrome.

Loss of Sec23A is lethal to mice in utero. In humans, a Sec23A variant causes Cranio-lenticulo-sutural dysplasia, while Sec23B variants are associated with the bone marrow disease congenital dyserythropoietic anemia type II and some cancers. Mice without Sec23B die soon after birth. Halperin-Birk syndrome (HLBKS), a rare autosomal recessive neurodevelopmental disorder, is caused by a null mutation in the SEC31A.

== Conformational changes ==
CopII has three specific binding sites that can each be complexed. The adjacent picture (Sed5) uses the Sec22 t-SNARE complex to bind. This site is more strongly bound, and therefore is more favored. (Embo)

Crystal structures of CopII
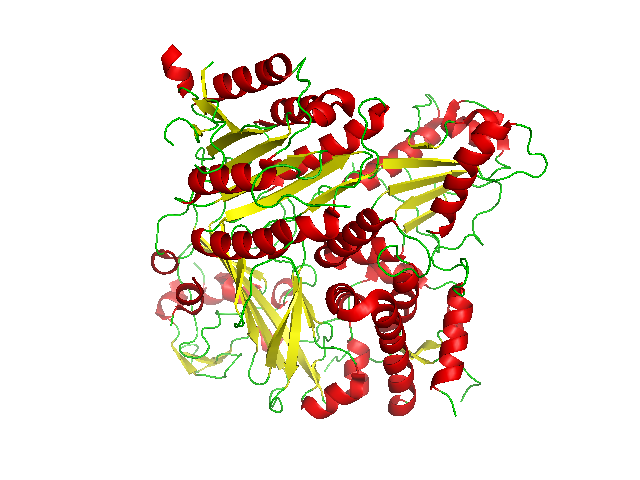
Conformation of the CopII protein complexed with the snare protein Bet1 (PDB: 1PCX).

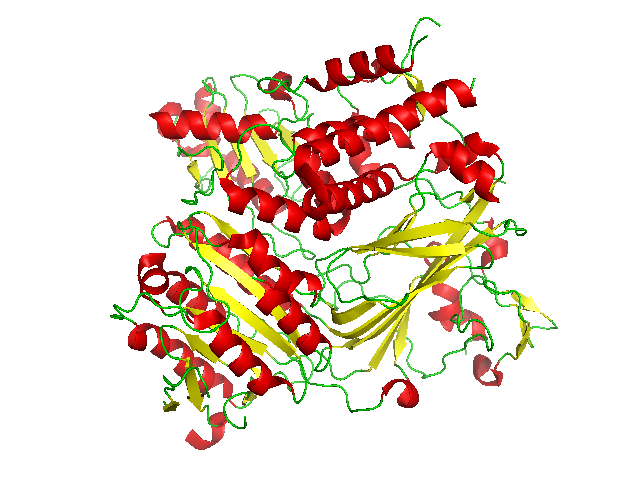
Conformation of the CopII protein that is complexed with the snare protein Sed5 (PDB: 1PD0).

== Research ==
Mutations the threonine at position 39 to asparagine generates a dominant negative Sar1A bound permanently to GDP; mutating histidine 79 to glycine generates a constitutively active Sar1A, with GTP hydrolysis slowed dramatically.

== See also ==
- COPI vesicles
- Clathrin vesicles
