= CA10 =

CA10 may refer to:

- California State Route 10 (disambiguation)
- California's 10th congressional district
- Carbonic anhydrase-related protein 10, encoded by the CA10 gene
- Jiefang CA-10, a Chinese truck
- Shin-Kambara Station, a railway station in Shizuoka, Japan (station code: CA10)
- United States Court of Appeals for the Tenth Circuit
