= Carbonic anhydrase =

Class of enzymes

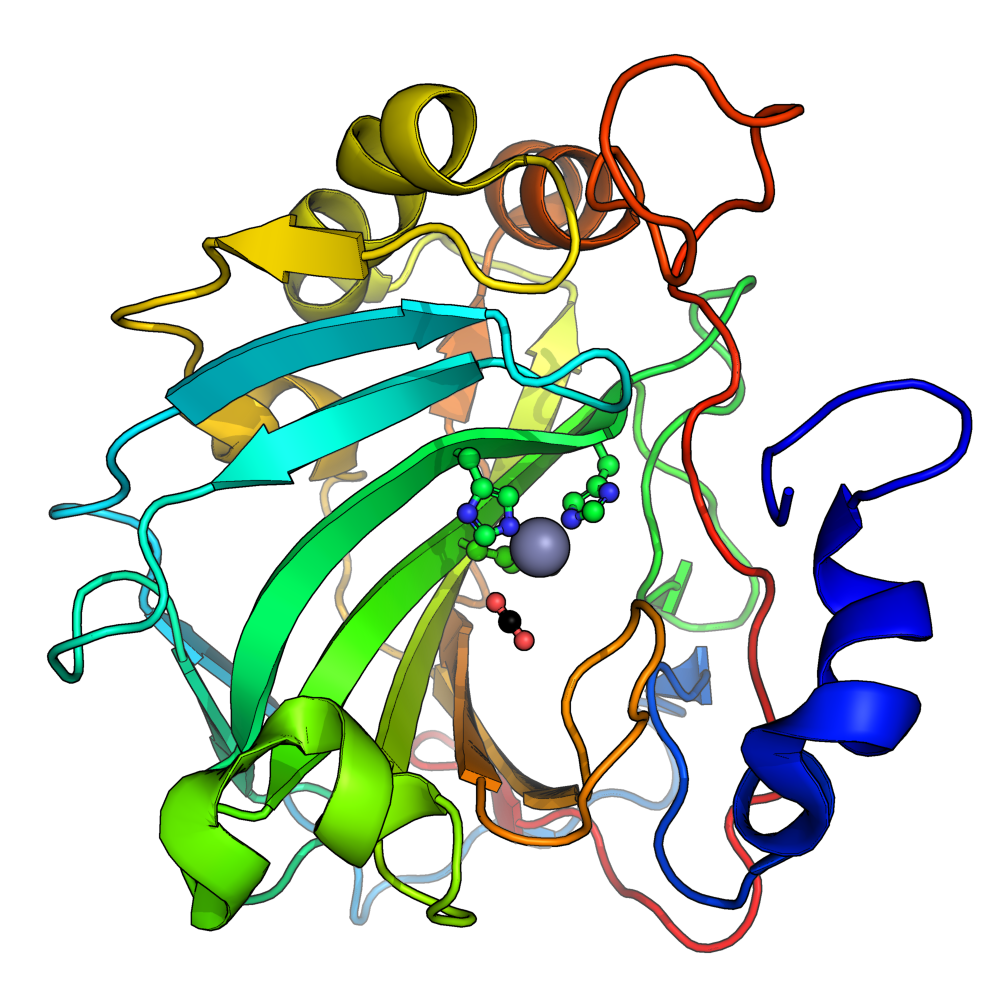
- Human carbonic anhydrase II with bound zinc and carbon dioxide. PDB: 6LUX

Identifiers
- EC no.: 4.2.1.1
- CAS no.: 9001-03-0

Databases
- BRENDA: enzyme data
- ExPASy: NiceZyme view
- KEGG: enzyme entry
- MetaCyc: metabolic pathway
- Rhea: reactions
- PDB structures: RCSB PDB PDBe PDBsum
- Gene Ontology: AmiGO / QuickGO
Search
- PMC: articles
- PubMed: articles
- NCBI: proteins

Eukaryotic-type carbonic anhydrase

Identifiers
- Symbol: Carb_anhydrase
- Pfam: PF00194
- InterPro: IPR001148
- PROSITE: PDOC00146
- SCOP2: 1can / SCOPe / SUPFAM
- Membranome: 333
Available protein structures:
- PDB: IPR001148 PF00194 (ECOD; PDBsum)
- AlphaFold: IPR001148; PF00194

The carbonic anhydrases (or carbonate dehydratases) (EC 4.2.1.1) form a family of enzymes that catalyze the interconversion between carbon dioxide and water and the dissociated ions of carbonic acid (i.e. bicarbonate and hydrogen ions). The active site of most carbonic anhydrases contains a zinc ion. They are therefore classified as metalloenzymes. The enzyme maintains acid-base balance and helps transport carbon dioxide.

Carbonic anhydrase helps maintain acid–base homeostasis and regulate pH and fluid balance. Depending on its location, the role of the enzyme changes slightly. For example, carbonic anhydrase produces acid in the stomach lining. In the kidney, the control of bicarbonate ions influences the water content of the cell. The control of bicarbonate ions also influences the water content in the eyes. Inhibitors of carbonic anhydrase are used to treat glaucoma, the excessive build-up of water in the eyes. Blocking this enzyme shifts the fluid balance in the eyes to reduce fluid build-up thereby relieving pressure.

Carbonic anhydrase is critical to hemoglobin function via the Bohr effect which catalyzes the hydration of carbon dioxide to form carbonic acid and rapidly dissociate into water. Essentially an increase in carbon dioxide results in lowered blood pH, which lowers oxygen-hemoglobin binding. The opposite is true where a decrease in the concentration of carbon dioxide raises the blood pH which raises the rate of oxygen-hemoglobin binding. Relating the Bohr effect to carbonic anhydrase is simple: carbonic anhydrase speeds up the reaction of carbon dioxide reacting with water to produce hydrogen ions (protons) and bicarbonate ions.

To describe equilibrium in the carbonic anhydrase reaction, Le Chatelier's principle is used. Most tissue is more acidic than lung tissue because carbon dioxide is produced by cellular respiration in these tissues, where it reacts with water to produce protons and bicarbonate. Because the carbon dioxide concentration is higher, the equilibrium shifts to the bicarbonate side. The opposite is seen in the lungs, where carbon dioxide is being released, reducing its concentration, so the equilibrium shifts to favoring carbon dioxide production.

== Occurrence and function ==
Carbonic anhydrase was initially isolated and characterised from red blood cells in 1933, with simultaneous reports by Meldrum and Roughton (at Cambridge University in the United Kingdom) and by Stadie and O’Brien (at the University of Pennsylvania in the United States), both while searching for a "catalytic factor... necessary for rapid transit of the HCO_{3}^{−} [bicarbonate anion] from the erythrocyte to... pulmonary capillar[ies]".

=== Regulation of pH ===
Carbonic anhydrase plays an essential role in regulating the blood pH, which speeds up the CO_{2} + H_{2}O $\ce{<=>}$ HCO_{3}^{−} + H^{+} reaction to ensure the equilibrium balance is rapidly maintained. The equilibrium reaction is influenced by the proportion of bicarbonate and H^{+} to carbon dioxide. The HCO_{3}^{−} is a conjugate base that neutralizes acids, and the H^{+} is a conjugate acid that neutralizes bases by Acid-base homeostasis. The HCO_{3}^{−} and H^{+} are ideal for buffering pH in the blood and tissues because the pK_{a} is close to the physiological pH = 7.2 – 7.6. Since HCO_{3}^{−} and H^{+} are regulated in the kidneys and plasma carbon dioxide is regulated in the lungs, both actions in the kidneys and lungs are important to maintain the stability of blood pH. Therefore, carbonic anhydrase helps with the H+ secretion into the lumen of the renal tubule and the reabsorption of HCO_{3}^{−} in the kidneys. Also, it helps the carbon dioxide transport from the lung tissue to the alveoli in the pulmonary capillary, where the carbon dioxide will be excreted during exhalation.

Carbonic anhydrase is an ancient enzyme found in both domains of prokaryotes that exists in six different classes among most of the living organisms. These families are not similar in sequence or structure because they evolved independently of each other, but all evolved the same Zn^{2+} active site structure, showing an example of convergent evolution.

== Background ==
An enzyme is a substance that acts as a catalyst in living organisms which helps to speed up chemical reactions. Carbonic anhydrase is one important enzyme that is found in red blood cells, gastric mucosa, pancreatic cells, and even renal tubules. It was discovered in the year 1932 and it has been categorized into three general classes. Class one being alpha carbonic anhydrase which is found in mammals, class two being beta carbonic anhydrase which is found in bacteria and plants and lastly, class three which is gamma carbonic anhydrase which is found in methanogen bacteria in hot springs. The three classes of carbonic anhydrase all have the same active site with a Zn metal centre; however, they are not structurally similar to each other. The main role of carbonic anhydrase in humans is to catalyze the conversion of carbon dioxide to carbonic acid and back again. However, it can also help with CO_{2} transport in the blood which in turn helps respiration. It can even function in the formation of hydrochloric acid by the stomach. Therefore, the role of carbonic anhydrase depends on where it is found in the body.

=== Structure ===
In mammalian CA II, the active site consists of the following: a hard Lewis acid Zn^{+2} metal atom coordinated to His -94, -96, and -119 residues 109˚ apart from one another and a hydroxide ion (pKa=6.8; 120° in T_{d} configuration, a hydrophobic pocket adjacent to Zinc-bound hydroxide consisting of by Val-143 at its base and Val-121, Trp-209, and Leu-198 at its neck, a Proton Shuttling Residue (PSR) His-64 H^{+} shuttles H^{+} in and out of active site via conformational switching, and a hydrogen bonding network consisting of Thr-199 hydroxyl group and Glu-106 the carboxyl group which stabilizes the Zinc-bound hydroxide by facilitating the orientation of water molecules in the active side to a specific geometric configuration. CA II has a turnover frequency of 10^{6} s^{−1} which is 10^{7} times faster than the uncatalyzed reaction.

== Reaction ==
Schematic of the cyclic reaction mechanism catalyzed by carbonic anhydrase II.

The reaction that shows the catalyzation by carbonic anhydrase in our tissues is

CO_{2} + H_{2}O ⟶ H_{2}CO_{3} ⟶ H^{+} + HCO^{−}_{3}

The catalyzation by carbonic anhydrase in the lungs is shown by

H^{+} + HCO^{−}_{3} ⟶ H_{2}CO_{3} ⟶ CO_{2} + H_{2}O

The reason for the reactions being in opposite directions for the tissues and lungs is because of the different pH levels found in them. Without the carbonic anhydrase catalyst, the reaction is slow, however with the catalyst the reaction is 10^{7} times faster.

The reaction catalyzed by carbonic anhydrase is

HCO^{−}_{3} + H^{+} ⇌ CO_{2} + H_{2}O

Carbonic acid has a pK_{a} of around 6.36 (the value depends on the conditions), so at pH 7 a small percentage of the bicarbonate is protonated.

Carbonic anhydrase is one of the fastest enzymes, and its rate is typically limited by the diffusion rate of its substrates. Typical catalytic rates of the different forms of this enzyme ranging between 10^{4} and 10^{6} reactions per second.

The uncatalyzed reverse reaction is relatively slow (kinetics in the 15-second range). This is why a carbonated drink does not instantly degas when opening the container; however, it will rapidly degas in the mouth when it comes in contact with carbonic anhydrase that is contained in saliva.

An anhydrase is defined as an enzyme that catalyzes the removal of a water molecule from a compound, and so it is this "reverse" reaction that gives carbonic anhydrase its name, because it removes a water molecule from carbonic acid.

In the lungs carbonic anhydrase converts bicarbonate to carbon dioxide, suited for exhalation.

=== CO_{2} transport ===
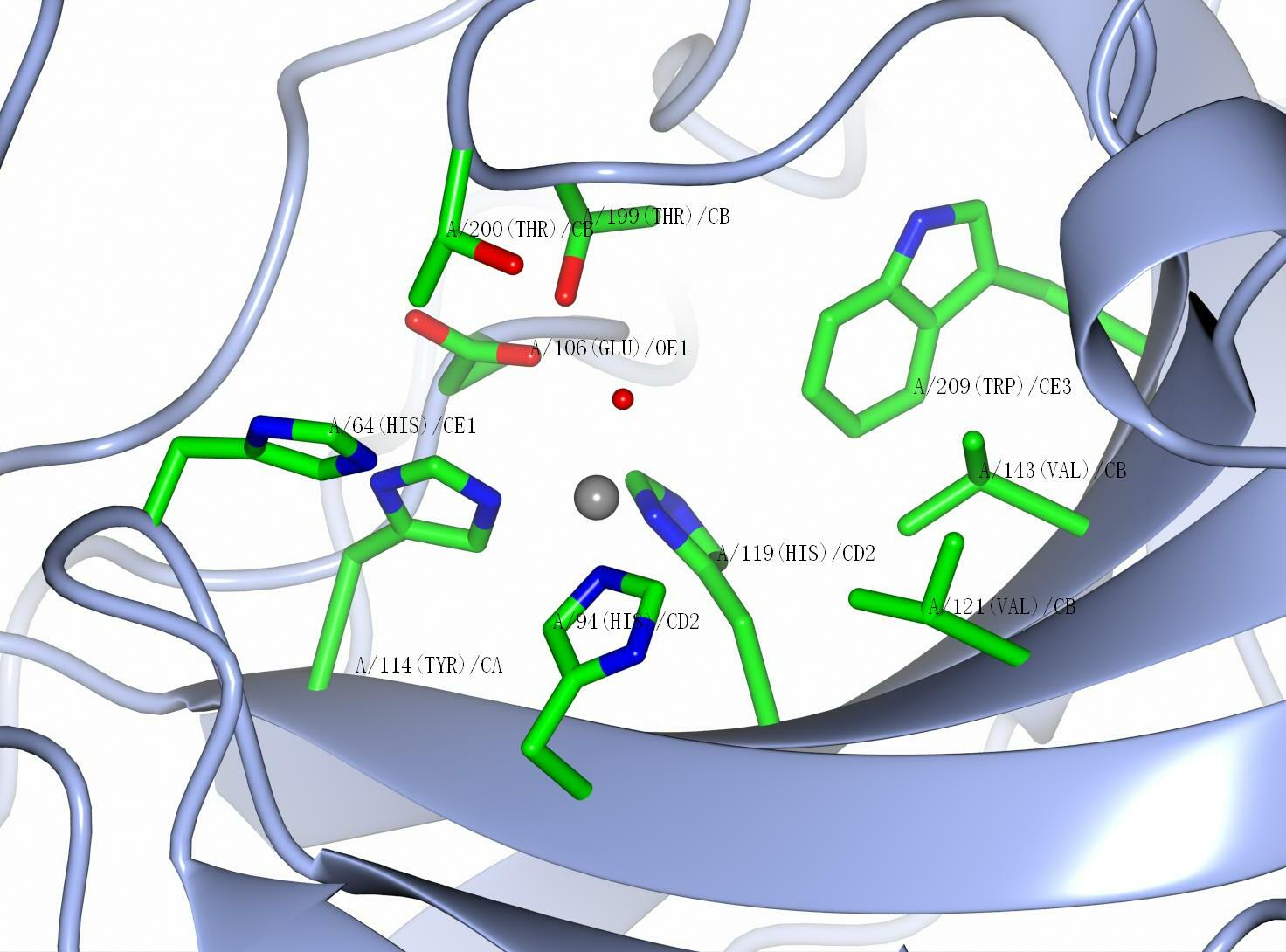
Active site of CAII enzyme (PDB code: 1CA2) which O = red, N = blue, Zn = grey and C = green

Carbon dioxide is transported in the blood in three forms:

1. Dissolved as gas in plasma – 7-10%
2. Bound to hemoglobin as carbaminohemoglobin in red blood cells – 20%
3. Present as bicarbonate ion in plasma and transported as bicarbonate - 70%

== Mechanism ==
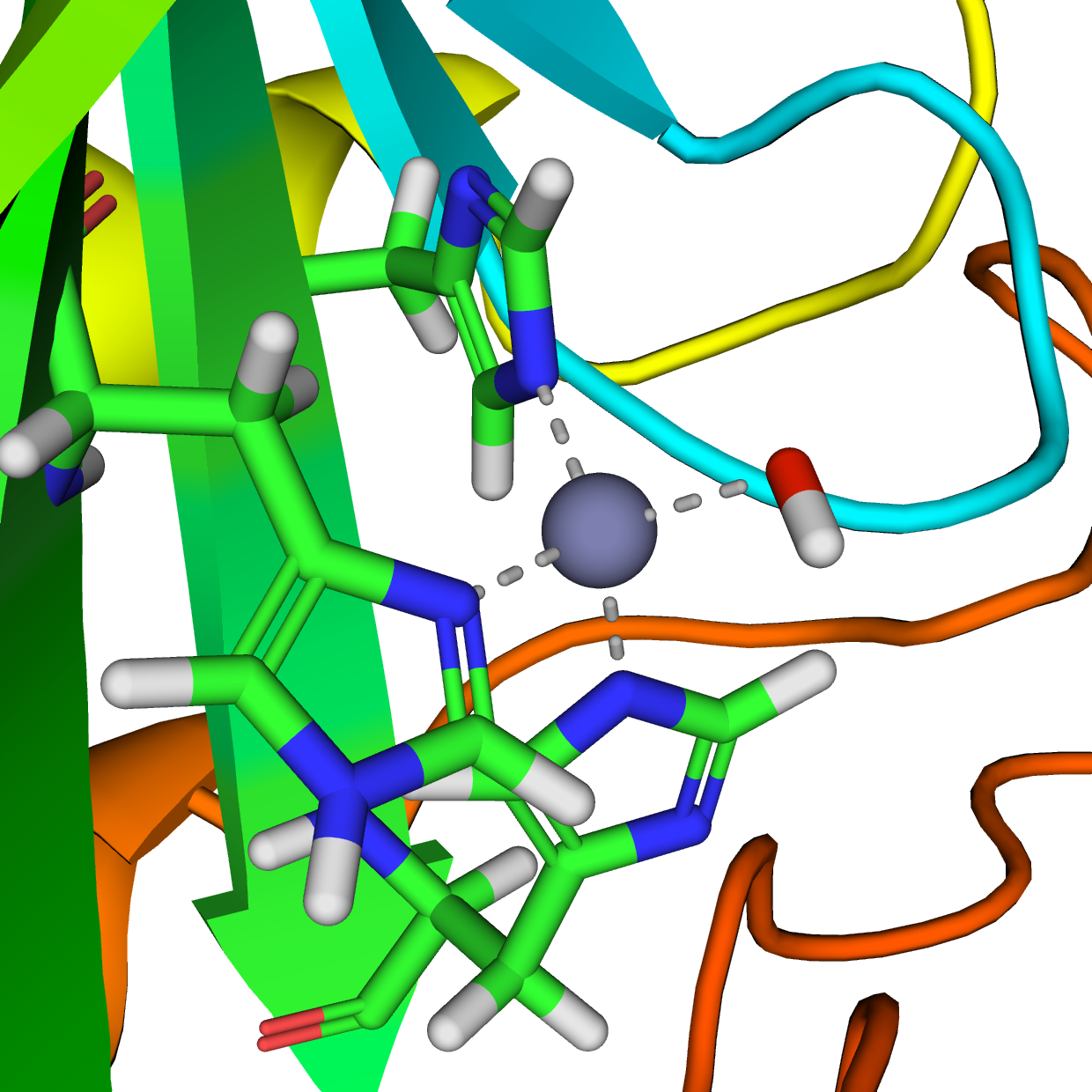
Close-up rendering of active site of human carbonic anhydrase II, showing three histidine residues and a hydroxide group coordinating (dashed lines) the zinc ion at center. From PDB: 1CA2.

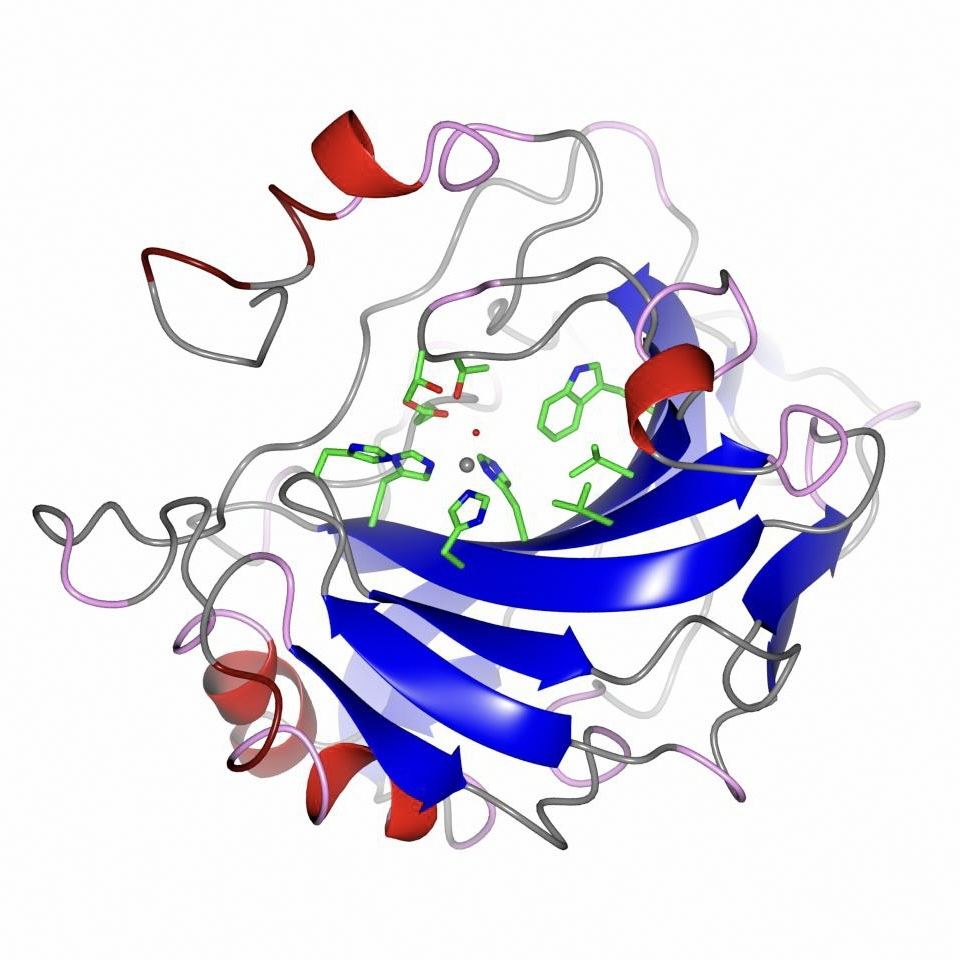
CAII enzyme (PDB code: 1CA2) showing the secondary structures and the hydrophobic pocket (right side of the Zn^{2+}) formed by the beta sheet (blue) and the two valine and one tryptophan side chains

A zinc prosthetic group in the enzyme is coordinated in three positions by histidine side-chains. The fourth coordination position is occupied by water. A fourth histidine is close to the water ligand, facilitating formation of Zn-OH center, which binds CO_{2} to give a zinc bicarbonate. The construct is an example of general acid – general base catalysis (see the article "Acid catalysis"). The active site also features a pocket suited for carbon dioxide, bringing it close to the hydroxide group. Kinetic studies performed determine the following mechanism for the enzyme: In Step 1 & 2, the nucleophile O^{−} on the hydroxide ion coordinated to Zn^{2+} performs a nucleophilic attack on the partially electrophilic carbon on the CO_{2} molecule. Here the Zn^{2+} acts as a Lewis acid that lowers the pK_{a} of the coordinated OH_{2} ligand from ~7-8 down to 6.8 as T_{d} , which drives the deprotonation of water to a hydroxide ion and the free proton is neutralized by the surrounding buffer. In step 3), a proton transfer (H^{+}) occurs from the OH^{−1} to the non-coordinated O^{−} in CO_{3}^{−2} coordinated to the Zn^{+2} atom in the active site. Next, a bicarbonate ion is released and the catalytic site is regenerated through the binding of another water molecule in exchange for the bicarbonate ion . In step 4), the coordinated water ligand is deprotonated facilitated by the Zn^{+2} to generate another hydroxide ion to start the cycle over again.

== Families ==
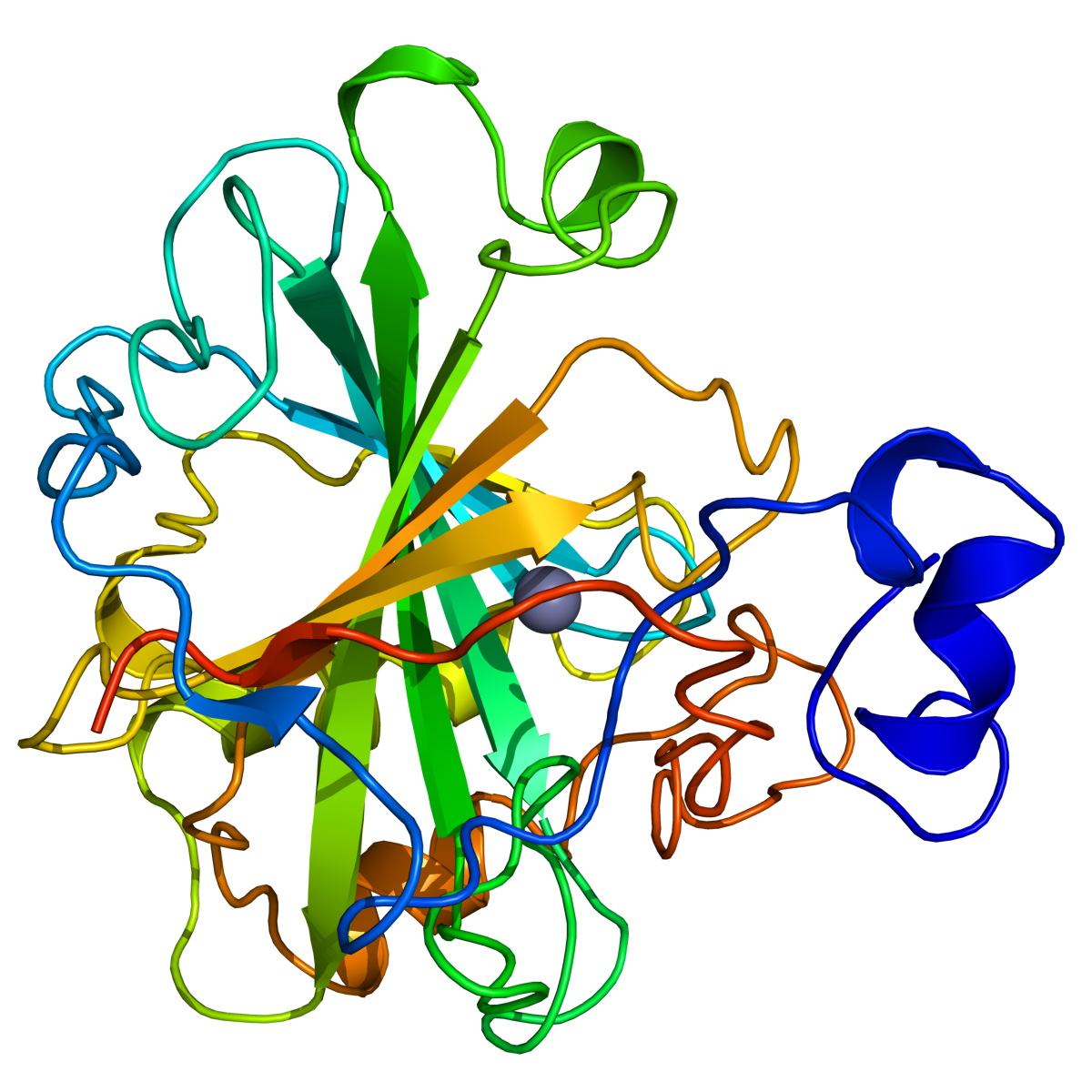
Ribbon diagram of human carbonic anhydrase II. Active site zinc ion visible at center. From PDB: 1CA2.

At least five distinct CA families are recognized: α, β, γ, δ and ζ. These families have no significant amino acid sequence similarity and in most cases are thought to be an example of convergent evolution. The α-CAs are found in humans.

=== α-CA ===
Eukaryotes, including vertebrates, algae, plants, and fungi, as well as some bacteria contain this family of CAs.

The CA enzymes found in mammals are divided into four broad subgroups, which, in turn consist of several homologous classes of genes:

- the cytosolic CAs (CA-I, CA-II, CA-III, CA-VII and CA XIII) (CA1, CA2, CA3, CA7, CA13)
- mitochondrial CAs (CA-VA and CA-VB) (CA5A, CA5B)
- secreted CAs (CA-VI) (CA6)
- membrane-associated CAs (CA-IV, CA-IX, CA-XII, CA-XIV and CA-XV) (CA4, CA9, CA12, CA14)

There are three additional "acatalytic" human carbonic anhydrase isoforms (CA-VIII, CA-X, and CA-XI) (CA8, CA10, CA11) whose functions remain unclear.

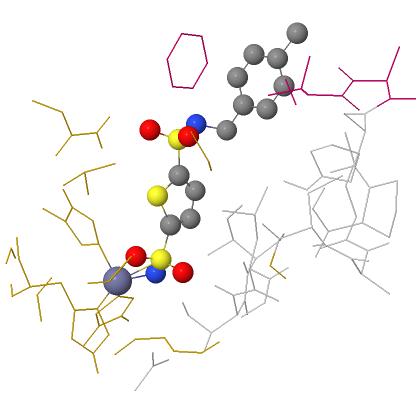
This image shows the ligands and pocket style of carbonic anhydrase.

Comparison of mammalian carbonic anhydrases
Isoform	Gene	Molecular mass (kDa)	Location		Specific activity of human enzymes, (Note: Except for mouse CA XV.) (s^{−1})	Sensitivity to sulfonamides, (Note: Acetazolamide in this table.) K_{I} (nM)
Isoform	Gene	Molecular mass (kDa)	Cell	Tissue	Specific activity of human enzymes, (s^{−1})	Sensitivity to sulfonamides, K_{I} (nM)
CA-I	CA1	29	cytosol	red blood cell and GI tract	2.0 × 10^{5}	250
CA-II	CA2	29	cytosol	almost ubiquitous	1.4 × 10^{6}	12
CA-III	CA3	29	cytosol	8% of soluble protein in Type I muscle	1.3 × 10^{4}	240000
CA-IV	CA4	35	extracellular GPI-linked	GI tract, kidney, endothelium	1.1 × 10^{6}	74
CA-VA	CA5A	34.7 (predicted)	mitochondria	liver	2.9 × 10^{5}	63
CA-VB	CA5B	36.4 (predicted)	mitochondria	widely distributed	9.5 × 10^{5}	54
CA-VI	CA6	39–42	secretory	saliva and milk	3.4 × 10^{5}	11
CA-VII	CA7	29	cytosol	widely distributed	9.5 × 10^{5}	2.5
CA-IX	CA9	54, 58	cell membrane-associated	normal GI tract, several cancers	3.8 × 10^{5}	16
CA-XII	CA12	44	extracellularily located active site	kidney, certain cancers	4.2 × 10^{5}	5.7
CA-XIII	CA13	29	cytosol	widely distributed	1.5 × 10^{5}	16
CA-XIV	CA14	54	extracellularily located active site	kidney, heart, skeletal muscle, brain	3.1 × 10^{5}	41
CA-XV	CA15	34–36	extracellular GPI-linked	kidney, not expressed in human tissues	4.7 × 10^{5}	72

=== β-CA ===
Most prokaryotic and plant chloroplast CAs belong to the beta family. Two signature patterns for this family have been identified:

- C-[SA]-D-S-R-[LIVM]-x-[AP]
- [EQ]-[YF]-A-[LIVM]-x(2)-[LIVM]-x(4)-[LIVMF](3)-x-G-H-x(2)-C-G

=== γ-CA ===
The gamma class of CAs comes from methanogens, methane-producing archaea that grow in hot springs.

=== δ-CA ===
The delta class of CAs has been described in diatoms. However, the distinction of this class of CA has been questioned.

=== ζ-CA ===
The zeta class of CAs occurs exclusively in bacteria in a few chemolithotrophs and marine cyanobacteria that contain cso-carboxysomes. Recent 3-dimensional analyses suggest that ζ-CA bears some structural resemblance to β-CA, particularly near the metal ion site. Thus, the two forms may be distantly related, even though the underlying amino acid sequence has since diverged considerably.

=== η-CA ===
The eta family of CAs was recently found in organisms of the genus Plasmodium. These are a group of enzymes previously thought to belong to the alpha family of CAs, however it has been demonstrated that η-CAs have unique features, such as their metal ion coordination pattern.

=== ι-CA ===
The iota class is the most recent class of CAs described. It has been discovered in the marine diatom Thalassiosira pseudonana, and is widespread among marine phytoplankton. In diatoms, the ι-CA is essential for the CO_{2}-concentrating mechanisms and - in contrast to other CA classes - it can use manganese instead of zinc as metal cofactor. Homologs of the ι-CA have been also confirmed in gram-negative bacteria, where can be present as a protein homodimer.

== Structure and function ==
Several forms of carbonic anhydrase occur in nature. In the best-studied α-carbonic anhydrase form present in animals, the zinc ion is coordinated by the imidazole rings of three histidine residues, His94, His96, and His119.

The primary function of the enzyme in animals is to interconvert carbon dioxide and bicarbonate to maintain acid-base balance in blood and other tissues, and to help transport carbon dioxide out of tissues.

There are at least 14 different isoforms in mammals. Plants contain a different form called β-carbonic anhydrase, which, from an evolutionary standpoint, is a distinct enzyme, but participates in the same reaction and also uses a zinc ion in its active site. In plants, carbonic anhydrase helps raise the concentration of CO_{2} within the chloroplast in order to increase the carboxylation rate of the enzyme RuBisCO. This is the reaction that integrates CO_{2} into organic carbon sugars during photosynthesis, and can use only the CO_{2} form of carbon, not carbonic acid or bicarbonate.

== Cadmium-containing carbonic anhydrase ==
Marine diatoms have been found to express a new form of ζ carbonic anhydrase. Thalassiosira weissflogii, a species of phytoplankton common to many marine ecosystems, was found to contain carbonic anhydrase with a cadmium ion in place of zinc. Previously, it had been believed that cadmium was a toxic metal with no biological function whatsoever. However, this species of phytoplankton appears to have adapted to the low levels of zinc in the ocean by using cadmium when there is not enough zinc. Although the concentration of cadmium in sea water is also low (about 1 × 10^{−16} molar), there is an environmental advantage to being able to use either metal depending on which is more available at the time. This type of carbonic anhydrase is therefore cambialistic, meaning it can interchange the metal in its active site with other metals (namely, zinc and cadmium).

=== Similarities to other carbonic anhydrases ===
The mechanism of cadmium carbonic anhydrase (CDCA) is essentially the same as that of other carbonic anhydrases in its conversion of carbon dioxide and water into bicarbonate and a proton. Additionally, like the other carbonic anhydrases, CDCA makes the reaction go almost as fast as the diffusion rate of its substrates, and it can be inhibited by sulfonamide and sulfamate derivatives.

=== Differences from other carbonic anhydrases ===
Unlike most other carbonic anhydrases, the active site metal ion is not bound by three histidine residues and a hydroxide ion. Instead, it is bound by two cysteine residues, one histidine residue, and a hydroxide ion, which is characteristic of β-CA. Due to the fact that cadmium is a soft acid, it will be more tightly bound by soft base ligands. The sulfur atoms on the cysteine residues are soft bases, thus binding the cadmium more tightly than the nitrogen on histidine residues would. CDCA also has a three-dimensional folding structure that is unlike any other carbonic anhydrase, and its amino acid sequence is dissimilar to the other carbonic anhydrases. It is a monomer with three domains, each one identical in amino acid sequence and each one containing an active site with a metal ion.

Another key difference between CDCA and the other carbonic anhydrases is that CDCA has a mechanism for switching out its cadmium ion for a zinc ion in the event that zinc becomes more available to the phytoplankton than cadmium. The active site of CDCA is essentially "gated" by a chain of nine amino acids with glycine residues at positions 1 and 9. Normally, this gate remains closed and the cadmium ion is trapped inside. However, due to the flexibility and position of the glycine residues, this gate can be opened in order to remove the cadmium ion. A zinc ion can then be put in its place and the gate will close behind it. As a borderline acid, zinc will not bind as tightly to the cysteine ligands as cadmium would, but the enzyme will still be active and reasonably efficient. The metal in the active site can be switched between zinc and cadmium depending on which one is more abundant at the time. It is the ability of CDCA to utilize either cadmium or zinc that likely gives T. weissflogii a survival advantage.

=== Transport of cadmium ===
Cadmium is still considered lethal to phytoplankton in high amounts. Studies have shown that T. weissflogii has an initial toxic response to cadmium when exposed to it. The toxicity of the metal is reduced by the transcription and translation of phytochelatin, which are proteins that can bind and transport cadmium. Once bound by phytochelatin, cadmium is no longer toxic, and it can be safely transported to the CDCA enzyme. It's also been shown that the uptake of cadmium via phytochelatin leads to a significant increase in CDCA expression.

=== CDCA-like proteins ===
Other phytoplankton from different water sources have been tested for the presence of CDCA. It was found that many of them contain proteins that are homologous to the CDCA found in T. weissflogii. This includes species from Great Bay, New Jersey as well as in the Pacific Ocean near the equator. In all species tested, CDCA-like proteins showed high levels of expression even in high concentrations of zinc and in the absence of cadmium. The similarity between these proteins and the CDCA expressed by T. weissflogii varied, but they were always at least 67% similar.

== Carbon capture and sequestration ==
Carbonic anhydrase could in principle prove relevant to carbon capture. Some carbonic anhydrases can withstand temperatures up to 107 °C and extreme alkalinity (pH > 10). A pilot run with the more stable CA on a flue stream that consisted of 12–13% mol composition CO_{2} had a capture rate of 63.6% over a 60-hour period with no noticeable effects in enzyme performance. CA was placed in a N-methyldiethanolamine (MDEA) solution where it served to increase the concentration difference (driving force) of CO_{2} between the flue stream of the power plant and liquid phase in a liquid-gas contactor.

== See also ==
- Carbonic anhydrase inhibitor
