= California State Route 10 =

Two highways in the U.S. state of California have been signed as Route 10 :

- Interstate 10 in California, part of the Interstate Highway System but simply referred to as "Route 10" in state law
- California State Route 10 (1934-1960s), later Route 42
