= Carbonic anhydrase 13 =

Human protein

CA13

Identifiers
- Aliases: CA13, CAXIII, carbonic anhydrase 13
- External IDs: OMIM: 611436; MGI: 1931322; GeneCards: CA13
Available structures
PDB	Ortholog search: PDBe RCSB
PDB	List of PDB id codes 3CZV, 3D0N, 3DA2, 4HU1, 4KNM, 4KNN, 4QIZ, 4QJP, 4QJX, 4QSJ
Enzyme activity
EC #	BRENDA	ExPASy	KEGG	MetaCyc
4.2.1.1	↗	↗	↗	↗

Gene location (Human)
Chr.	Chromosome 8 (human)
Band	8q21.2	Start	85,220,587 bp
Band	8q21.2	End	85,284,073 bp

Gene location (Mouse)
Chr.	Chromosome 3 (mouse)
Band	3|3 A1	Start	14,706,787 bp
Band	3|3 A1	End	14,728,062 bp
RNA expression pattern
Bgee	Human / Mouse (ortholog); Top expressed in: jejunal mucosa; palpebral conjunctiva; pancreatic epithelial cell; mucosa of ileum; nasal epithelium; amniotic fluid; endothelial cell; gingival epithelium; skin of arm; duodenum / Top expressed in: meninges; esophagus; membranous bone; lip; jejunum; mandible; vestibular sensory epithelium; vestibular membrane of cochlear duct; gastric mucosa; epithelium of stomach; More reference expression data
BioGPS	n/a
Gene ontology
Molecular function	zinc ion binding; lyase activity; metal ion binding; carbonate dehydratase activity; carbonic anhydrase
Cellular component	myelin sheath; cytosol; intracellular membrane-bounded organelle
Biological process	bicarbonate transport
Sources:Amigo / QuickGO
Orthologs
Databases	NCBI: entry; OMA: entry
Species	Human	Mouse
Entrez	377677	71934
Ensembl	ENSG00000185015	ENSMUSG00000027555
UniProt	Q8N1Q1	Q9D6N1
RefSeq (mRNA)	NM_198584	NM_024495
RefSeq (protein)	NP_940986	NP_078771
Location (UCSC)	Chr 8: 85.22 – 85.28 Mb	Chr 3: 14.71 – 14.73 Mb
PubMed search
- Wikidata
View/Edit Human	View/Edit Mouse

Carbonic anhydrase 13 is a protein that in humans is encoded by the CA13 gene.

== Function ==
Carbonic anhydrases (CAs) are a family of zinc metalloenzymes that catalyze the interconversion between carbon dioxide and water and the dissociated ions of carbonic acid (i.e. bicarbonate and hydrogen ions).
