= Carbonic anhydrase 7 =

Enzyme found in humans

CA7

Identifiers
- Aliases: CA7, CAVII, carbonic anhydrase 7, CA-VII
- External IDs: OMIM: 114770; MGI: 103100; GeneCards: CA7
Available structures
PDB	Ortholog search: PDBe RCSB
PDB	List of PDB id codes 3MDZ, 3ML5
Enzyme activity
EC #	BRENDA	ExPASy	KEGG	MetaCyc
4.2.1.1	↗	↗	↗	↗

Gene location (Human)
Chr.	Chromosome 16 (human)
Band	16q22.1	Start	66,844,414 bp
Band	16q22.1	End	66,854,153 bp

Gene location (Mouse)
Chr.	Chromosome 8 (mouse)
Band	8|8 D3	Start	105,261,321 bp
Band	8|8 D3	End	105,276,975 bp
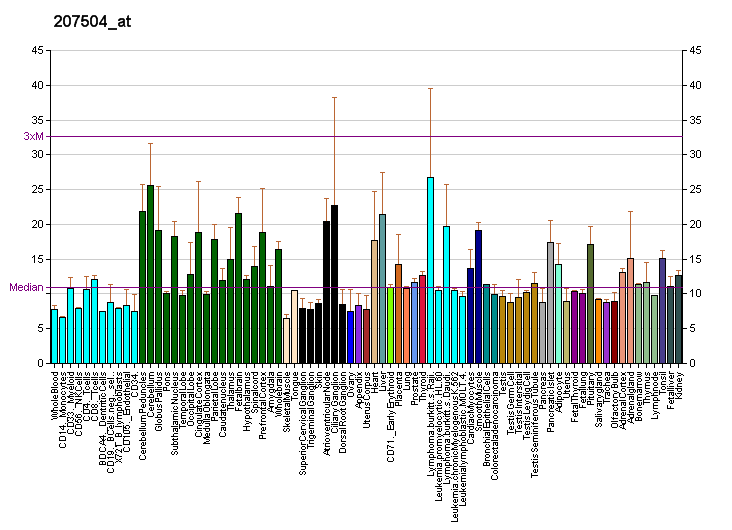
RNA expression pattern
Bgee	Human / Mouse (ortholog); Top expressed in: mucosa of transverse colon; rectum; mucosa of sigmoid colon; testicle; Brodmann area 10; right frontal lobe; Brodmann area 9; putamen; caudate nucleus; cingulate gyrus / Top expressed in: yolk sac; Paneth cell; trigeminal ganglion; facial motor nucleus; substantia nigra; cerebellar vermis; lobe of cerebellum; visual cortex; Region I of hippocampus proper; primary visual cortex; More reference expression data
BioGPS	More reference expression data
Gene ontology
Molecular function	carbonate dehydratase activity; zinc ion binding; metal ion binding; lyase activity; carbonic anhydrase
Cellular component	cytoplasm; cytosol
Biological process	bicarbonate transport; positive regulation of cellular pH reduction; positive regulation of synaptic transmission, GABAergic; regulation of chloride transport
Sources:Amigo / QuickGO
Orthologs
Databases	NCBI: entry; OMA: entry
Species	Human	Mouse
Entrez	766	12354
Ensembl	ENSG00000168748	ENSMUSG00000031883
UniProt	P43166	Q9ERQ8
RefSeq (mRNA)	NM_001014435; NM_005182; NM_001365337	NM_001301164; NM_001301165; NM_053070
RefSeq (protein)	NP_001014435; NP_005173; NP_001352266	NP_001288093; NP_001288094; NP_444300
Location (UCSC)	Chr 16: 66.84 – 66.85 Mb	Chr 8: 105.26 – 105.28 Mb
PubMed search
- Wikidata
View/Edit Human	View/Edit Mouse

Carbonic anhydrase 7 (CA7) is an enzyme that in humans is encoded by the CA7 gene.

== Function ==
Carbonic anhydrases are a large family of zinc metalloenzymes that catalyze the reversible hydration of carbon dioxide. They participate in a variety of biological processes, including respiration, calcification, acid-base balance, bone resorption, and the formation of aqueous humor, cerebrospinal fluid, saliva, and gastric acid. They show extensive diversity in tissue distribution and in their subcellular localization. The cytosolic protein encoded by this gene is predominantly expressed in the salivary glands. Alternative splicing in the coding region results in multiple transcript variants encoding different isoforms.
