= Carbonic anhydrase 5B, mitochondrial =

Enzyme found in humans

CA5B

Identifiers
- Aliases: CA5B, CA-VB, carbonic anhydrase 5B, CAVB
- External IDs: OMIM: 300230; MGI: 1926249; GeneCards: CA5B
Enzyme activity
EC #	BRENDA	ExPASy	KEGG	MetaCyc
4.2.1.1	↗	↗	↗	↗

Gene location (Human)
Chr.	X chromosome (human)
Band	Xp22.2	Start	15,688,830 bp
Band	Xp22.2	End	15,788,411 bp

Gene location (Mouse)
Chr.	X chromosome (mouse)
Band	X|X F5	Start	162,759,818 bp
Band	X|X F5	End	162,810,993 bp
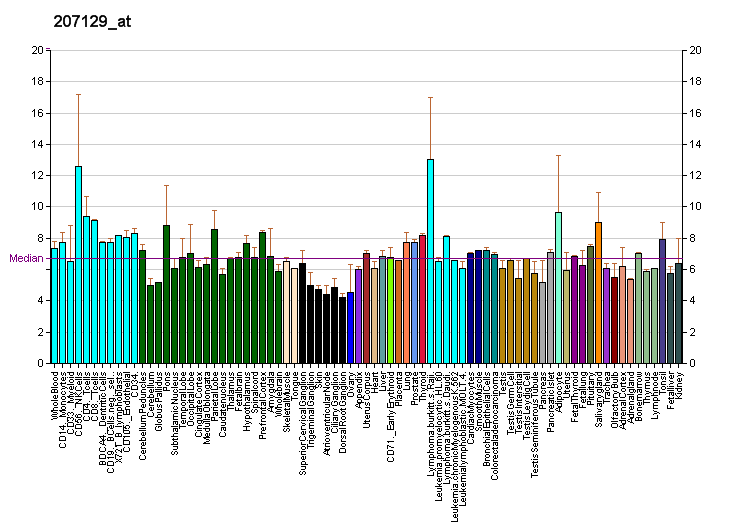
RNA expression pattern
Bgee	Human / Mouse (ortholog); Top expressed in: Achilles tendon; monocyte; granulocyte; ascending aorta; right coronary artery; tibial arteries; canal of the cervix; Descending thoracic aorta; left ovary; right ovary / Top expressed in: white adipose tissue; right kidney; mammary gland; seminal vesicula; subcutaneous adipose tissue; brown adipose tissue; proximal tubule; human kidney; intercostal muscle; tunica adventitia of aorta; More reference expression data
BioGPS	More reference expression data
Gene ontology
Molecular function	lyase activity; metal ion binding; zinc ion binding; carbonate dehydratase activity; carbonic anhydrase
Cellular component	mitochondrial matrix; mitochondrion
Biological process	bicarbonate transport; response to bacterium; one-carbon metabolic process
Sources:Amigo / QuickGO
Orthologs
Databases	NCBI: entry; OMA: entry
Species	Human	Mouse
Entrez	11238	56078
Ensembl	ENSG00000169239	ENSMUSG00000031373
UniProt	Q9Y2D0	Q9QZA0
RefSeq (mRNA)	NM_007220	NM_181315
RefSeq (protein)	NP_009151; NP_009151.1	NP_851832
Location (UCSC)	Chr X: 15.69 – 15.79 Mb	Chr X: 162.76 – 162.81 Mb
PubMed search
- Wikidata
View/Edit Human	View/Edit Mouse

Carbonic anhydrase 5B, mitochondrial is an enzyme that in humans is encoded by the CA5B gene.

Carbonic anhydrases (CAs) are a large family of zinc metalloenzymes that catalyze the reversible hydration of carbon dioxide. They participate in a variety of biological processes, including respiration, calcification, acid-base balance, bone resorption, and the formation of aqueous humor, cerebrospinal fluid, saliva, and gastric acid. They show extensive diversity in tissue distribution and in their subcellular localization. CA VB is localized in the mitochondria and shows the highest sequence similarity to the other mitochondrial CA, CA VA. It has a wider tissue distribution than CA VA, which is restricted to the liver. The differences in tissue distribution suggest that the two mitochondrial carbonic anhydrases evolved to assume different physiologic roles.
