= Carbonic anhydrase 14 =

Enzyme found in humans

CA14
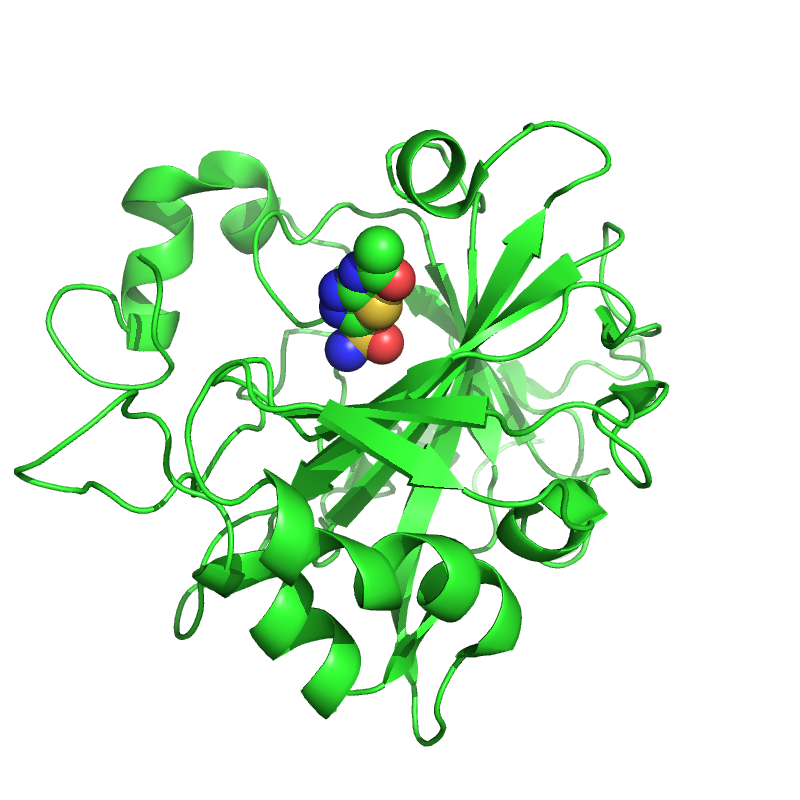

Identifiers
- Aliases: CA14, CAXiV, carbonic anhydrase 14
- External IDs: OMIM: 604832; MGI: 1344341; GeneCards: CA14
Available structures
PDB	Ortholog search: PDBe RCSB
PDB	List of PDB id codes 4LU3, 5CJF
Enzyme activity
EC #	BRENDA	ExPASy	KEGG	MetaCyc
4.2.1.1	↗	↗	↗	↗

Gene location (Human)
Chr.	Chromosome 1 (human)
Band	1q21.2	Start	150,257,251 bp
Band	1q21.2	End	150,265,078 bp

Gene location (Mouse)
Chr.	Chromosome 3 (mouse)
Band	3|3 F2.1	Start	95,805,080 bp
Band	3|3 F2.1	End	95,812,003 bp
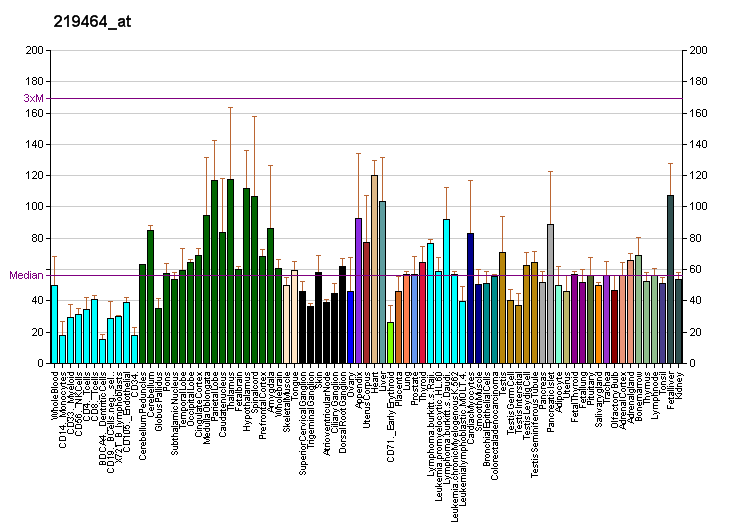
RNA expression pattern
Bgee	Human / Mouse (ortholog); Top expressed in: retinal pigment epithelium; C1 segment; substantia nigra; Epithelium of choroid plexus; vastus lateralis muscle; ventricular zone; corpus callosum; embryo; apex of heart; Skeletal muscle tissue of rectus abdominis / Top expressed in: retinal pigment epithelium; choroid plexus of fourth ventricle; Epithelium of choroid plexus; right kidney; epithelium of lens; epiblast; interventricular septum; stria vascularis; cardiac muscle tissue of left ventricle; muscle of thigh; More reference expression data
BioGPS	More reference expression data
Gene ontology
Molecular function	metal ion binding; lyase activity; carbonate dehydratase activity; zinc ion binding; carbonic anhydrase
Cellular component	plasma membrane; membrane; integral component of membrane
Biological process	bicarbonate transport
Sources:Amigo / QuickGO
Orthologs
Databases	NCBI: entry; OMA: entry
Species	Human	Mouse
Entrez	23632	23831
Ensembl	ENSG00000118298	ENSMUSG00000038526
UniProt	Q9ULX7	Q9WVT6
RefSeq (mRNA)	NM_012113	NM_011797; NM_001355750; NM_001355751; NM_001355752
RefSeq (protein)	NP_036245	NP_035927; NP_001342679; NP_001342680; NP_001342681
Location (UCSC)	Chr 1: 150.26 – 150.27 Mb	Chr 3: 95.81 – 95.81 Mb
PubMed search
- Wikidata
View/Edit Human	View/Edit Mouse

Carbonic anhydrase 14 is an enzyme that in humans is encoded by the CA14 gene.

Carbonic anhydrases (CAs) are a large family of zinc metalloenzymes that catalyze the reversible hydration of carbon dioxide. They participate in a variety of biological processes, including respiration, calcification, acid-base balance, bone resorption, and the formation of aqueous humor, cerebrospinal fluid, saliva, and gastric acid. They show extensive diversity in tissue distribution and in their subcellular localization. CA XIV is predicted to be a type I membrane protein and shares highest sequence similarity with the other transmembrane CA isoform, CA XII; however, they have different patterns of tissue-specific expression and thus may play different physiologic roles.

In melanocytic cells CA14 gene expression may be regulated by MITF.
