= Carbonic anhydrase 5A, mitochondrial =

Enzyme found in humans

CA5A

Identifiers
- Aliases: CA5A, CA5, CA5AD, CAV, CAVA, GS1-21A4.1, carbonic anhydrase 5A
- External IDs: OMIM: 114761; MGI: 101946; GeneCards: CA5A
Available structures
PDB	Ortholog search: PDBe RCSB
PDB	List of PDB id codes 1DMX, 1DMY, 1KEQ, 1URT
Enzyme activity
EC #	BRENDA	ExPASy	KEGG	MetaCyc
4.2.1.1	↗	↗	↗	↗

Gene location (Human)
Chr.	Chromosome 16 (human)
Band	16q24.2	Start	87,881,546 bp
Band	16q24.2	End	87,936,580 bp

Gene location (Mouse)
Chr.	Chromosome 8 (mouse)
Band	8 E1|8 70.81 cM	Start	122,642,865 bp
Band	8 E1|8 70.81 cM	End	122,671,643 bp
RNA expression pattern
Bgee	Human / Mouse (ortholog); Top expressed in: right lobe of liver; testicle; islet of Langerhans; hippocampus proper; C1 segment; substantia nigra; prefrontal cortex; putamen; apex of heart; hypothalamus / Top expressed in: left lobe of liver; proximal tubule; right kidney; embryo; embryo; perirhinal cortex; CA3 field; entorhinal cortex; human kidney; morula; More reference expression data
BioGPS	n/a
Gene ontology
Molecular function	carbonate dehydratase activity; zinc ion binding; metal ion binding; lyase activity; carbonic anhydrase
Cellular component	mitochondrial matrix; mitochondrion
Biological process	bicarbonate transport
Sources:Amigo / QuickGO
Orthologs
Databases	NCBI: entry; OMA: entry
Species	Human	Mouse
Entrez	763	12352
Ensembl	ENSG00000174990	ENSMUSG00000025317
UniProt	P35218	P23589
RefSeq (mRNA)	NM_001739; NM_001367225	NM_007608
RefSeq (protein)	NP_001730	NP_031634
Location (UCSC)	Chr 16: 87.88 – 87.94 Mb	Chr 8: 122.64 – 122.67 Mb
PubMed search
- Wikidata
View/Edit Human	View/Edit Mouse

Carbonic anhydrase 5A, mitochondrial is a protein that in humans is encoded by the CA5A gene.

== Function ==
Carbonic anhydrases (CAs) are a family of zinc metalloenzymes that catalyze the reversible hydration of carbon dioxide. They participate in a variety of biological processes, including respiration, calcification, acid-base balance, bone resorption, and the formation of aqueous humor, cerebrospinal fluid, saliva, and gastric acid. They show extensive diversity in tissue distribution and in their subcellular localization. CA5A is localized in the mitochondria and expressed primarily in the liver. It may play an important role in ureagenesis and gluconeogenesis. CA5A gene maps to chromosome 16q24.3 and an unprocessed pseudogene has been assigned to 16p12-p11.2. [provided by RefSeq, Jul 2008].
