= Carbonic anhydrase-related protein 10 =

Protein-coding gene in humans

CA10

Identifiers
- Aliases: CA10, CA-RPX, CARPX, HUCEP-15, carbonic anhydrase 10
- External IDs: OMIM: 604642; MGI: 1919855; HomoloGene: 23201; GeneCards: CA10; OMA:CA10 - orthologs

Gene location (Human)
Chr.	Chromosome 17 (human)
Band	17q21.33-q22	Start	51,630,313 bp
Band	17q21.33-q22	End	52,160,017 bp

Gene location (Mouse)
Chr.	Chromosome 11 (mouse)
Band	11|11 D	Start	92,988,854 bp
Band	11|11 D	End	93,492,575 bp
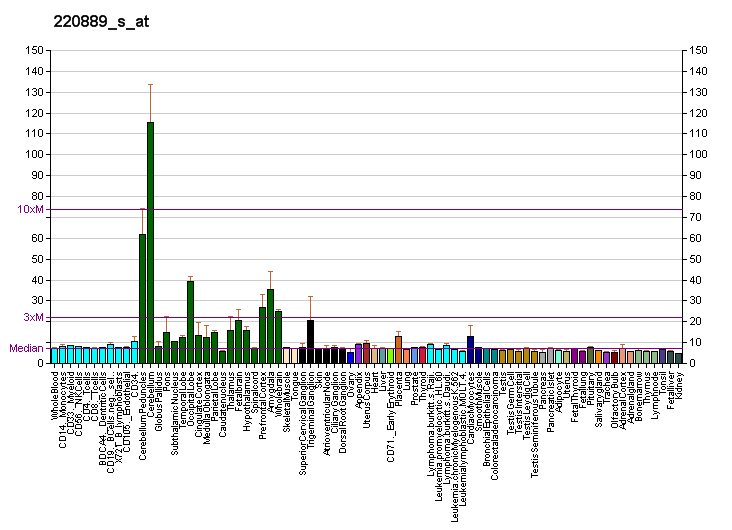
RNA expression pattern
Bgee	Human / Mouse (ortholog); Top expressed in: cerebellar cortex; cerebellar hemisphere; right hemisphere of cerebellum; cerebellar vermis; middle temporal gyrus; prefrontal cortex; dorsolateral prefrontal cortex; pons; right frontal lobe; Brodmann area 23 / Top expressed in: lobe of cerebellum; cerebellar vermis; primary motor cortex; habenula; ventromedial nucleus; anterior amygdaloid area; Epithelium of choroid plexus; cingulate gyrus; prefrontal cortex; piriform cortex; More reference expression data
BioGPS	More reference expression data
Gene ontology
Molecular function	molecular function; carbonate dehydratase activity; zinc ion binding; carbonic anhydrase
Cellular component	cellular component
Biological process	brain development
Sources:Amigo / QuickGO
Orthologs
Species	Human	Mouse
Entrez	56934	72605
Ensembl	ENSG00000154975	ENSMUSG00000056158
UniProt	Q9NS85	P61215
RefSeq (mRNA)	NM_001082533; NM_001082534; NM_020178	NM_028296; NM_001361707; NM_001361708
RefSeq (protein)	NP_001076002; NP_001076003; NP_064563	NP_082572; NP_001348636; NP_001348637
Location (UCSC)	Chr 17: 51.63 – 52.16 Mb	Chr 11: 92.99 – 93.49 Mb
PubMed search
- Wikidata
View/Edit Human	View/Edit Mouse

Carbonic anhydrase-related protein 10 is an enzyme that in humans is encoded by the CA10 gene.

This gene encodes a protein that belongs to the carbonic anhydrase family of zinc metalloenzymes, which catalyze the reversible hydration of carbon dioxide in various biological processes. The protein encoded by this gene is an acatalytic member of the alpha-carbonic anhydrase subgroup, and it is thought to play a role in the central nervous system, especially in brain development. Multiple transcript variants encoding the same protein have been found for this gene.
