= Carbonia =

Carbonia may refer to:

== Places ==
- Carbonia, Sardinia, a comune in the Province of South Sardinia, Italy

== Other uses ==
- Amorphous carbonia, a synthetically produced carbon dioxide glass
- Carbonia (crustacean), an old synonym for Carbonita, a crustacean from the Carboniferous period
