= Carbon dioxide =

Carbon-oxygen gas

- Structural formula of carbon dioxide with bond length

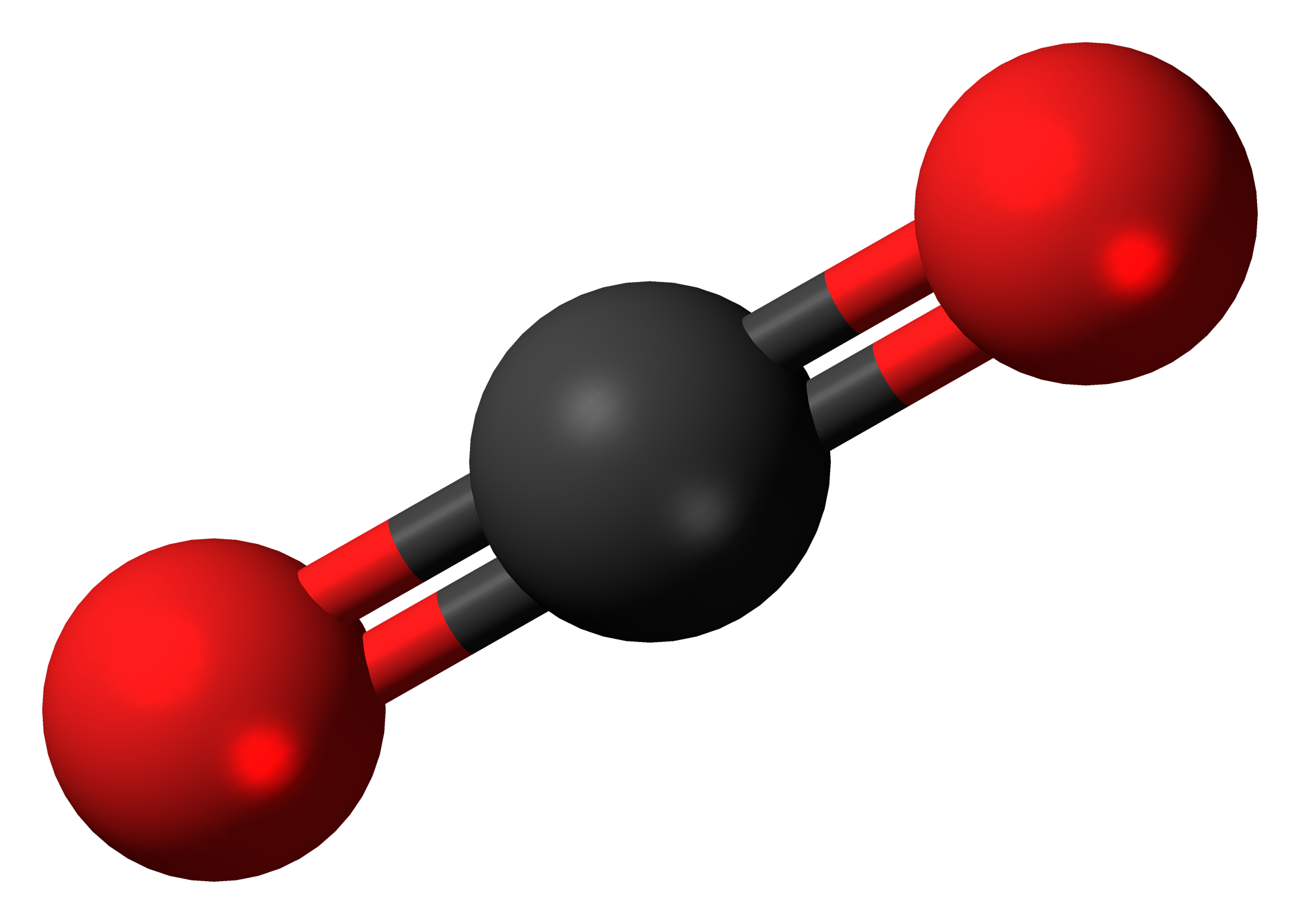
Ball-and-stick model of carbon dioxide
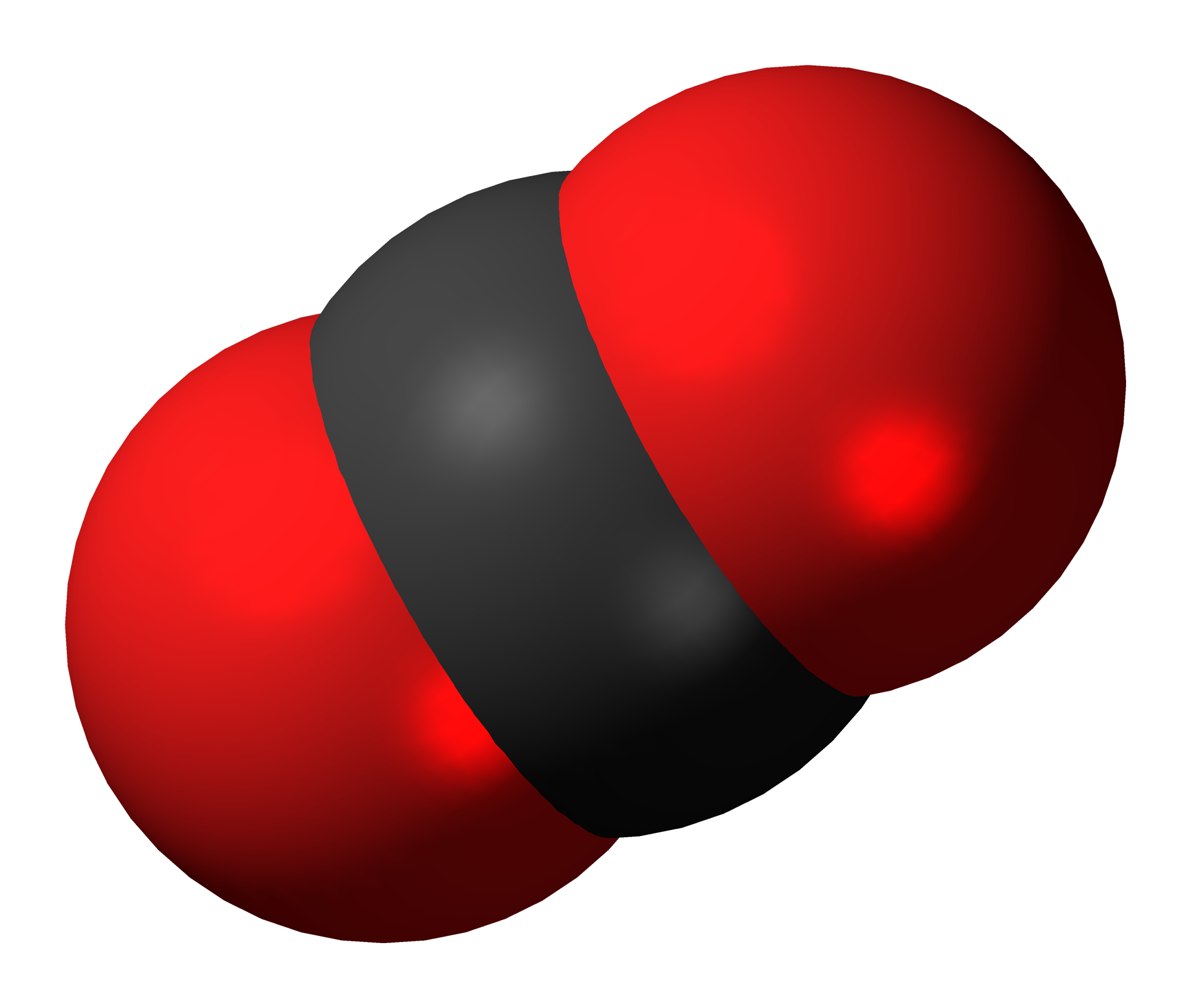
Space-filling model of carbon dioxide

Names
- IUPAC name Carbon dioxide
- Other names: Carbonic acid gas; Carbonic anhydride; Carbonic dioxide; Carbonic oxide; Carbon(IV) oxide; Methanedione; R-744 (refrigerant); R744 (refrigerant alternative spelling); Dry ice (solid phase)

Identifiers
| CAS Number | 124-38-9 |
| 3D model (JSmol) | Interactive image; Interactive image |
| Beilstein Reference | 1900390 |
| ChEBI | CHEBI:16526 |
| ChEMBL | ChEMBL1231871 |
| ChemSpider | 274 |
| ECHA InfoCard | 100.004.271 |
| EC Number | 204-696-9 |
| E number | E290 (preservatives) |
| Gmelin Reference | 989 |
| KEGG | D00004 |
| MeSH | Carbon+dioxide |
| PubChem CID | 280 |
| RTECS number | FF6400000 |
| UNII | 142M471B3J |
| UN number | 1013 (gas), 1845 (solid) |
| CompTox Dashboard (EPA) | DTXSID4027028 |
- InChI: InChI=1S/CO2/c2-1-3 Key: CURLTUGMZLYLDI-UHFFFAOYSA-N; InChI=1/CO2/c2-1-3 Key: CURLTUGMZLYLDI-UHFFFAOYAO
- SMILES: O=C=O; C(=O)=O

Properties
| Chemical formula | CO_{2} |
| Molar mass | 44.009 g·mol^{−1} |
| Appearance | Colorless gas |
| Odor | Low concentrations: none; High concentrations: sharp; acidic |
| Density | 1562 kg/m^{3} (solid at 1 atm (100 kPa) and −78.5 °C (−109.3 °F)); 1101 kg/m^{3} (liquid at saturation −37 °C (−35 °F)); 1.977 kg/m^{3} (gas at 1 atm (100 kPa) and 0 °C (32 °F)) |
| Critical point (T, P) | 304.128(15) K (30.978(15) °C), 7.3773(30) MPa (72.808(30) atm) |
| Sublimation conditions | 194.6855(30) K (−78.4645(30) °C) at 1 atm (0.101325 MPa) |
| Solubility in water | 1.45 g/L at 25 °C (77 °F), 100 kPa (0.99 atm) |
| Vapor pressure | 5.7292(30) MPa, 56.54(30) atm (20 °C (293.15 K)) |
| Acidity (pK_{a}) | Carbonic acid: pK_{a1} = 3.6 pK_{a1}(apparent) = 6.35 pK_{a2} = 10.33 |
| Magnetic susceptibility (χ) | −20.5·10^{−6} cm^{3}/mol |
| Thermal conductivity | 0.01662 W·m^{−1}·K^{−1} (300 K (27 °C; 80 °F)) |
| Refractive index (n_{D}) | 1.00045 |
| Viscosity | 14.90 μPa·s at 25 °C (298 K); 70 μPa·s at −78.5 °C (194.7 K) |
| Dipole moment | 0 D |

Structure
| Crystal structure | Trigonal |
| Point group | D_{∞h} |
| Molecular shape | Linear |

Thermochemistry
| Heat capacity (C) | 37.135 J/(K·mol) |
| Std molar entropy (S^{⦵}_{298}) | 214 J·mol^{−1}·K^{−1} |
| Std enthalpy of formation (Δ_{f}H^{⦵}_{298}) | −393.5 kJ·mol^{−1} |

Pharmacology
| ATC code | V03AN02 (WHO) |

Hazards
- GHS labelling
| Pictograms | (GHS04: Compressed Gas) |
| Signal word | Warning |
| Hazard statements | H280, H281 |
| Precautionary statements | P282, P336+P317, P403, P410+P403 |
| NFPA 704 (fire diamond) | 2 0 0 SA |
- Lethal dose or concentration (LD, LC)
| LC_{Lo} (lowest published) | 90,000 ppm (162,000 mg/m^{3}) (human, 5 min) |
- NIOSH (US health exposure limits)
| PEL (Permissible) | TWA 5000 ppm (9000 mg/m^{3}) |
| REL (Recommended) | TWA 5000 ppm (9000 mg/m^{3}), ST 30,000 ppm (54,000 mg/m^{3}) |
| IDLH (Immediate danger) | 40,000 ppm (72,000 mg/m^{3}) |
| Safety data sheet (SDS) | Sigma-Aldrich |

Related compounds
| Other anions | Carbon disulfide; Carbon diselenide; Carbon ditelluride |
| Other cations | Silicon dioxide; Germanium dioxide; Tin dioxide; Lead dioxide; Titanium dioxide; Zirconium dioxide; Hafnium dioxide; Cerium dioxide; Thorium dioxide |
| Related carbon oxides | See Oxocarbon |
| Related compounds | Carbonic acid; Carbonyl sulfide; Carbonyl selenide |

Supplementary data page
- Carbon dioxide (data page)
- Except where otherwise noted, data are given for materials in their standard state (at 25 °C [77 °F], 100 kPa). verify (what is ?) Infobox references

Carbon dioxide is a chemical compound with the chemical formula CO_{2}. It is made up of molecules that each have one carbon atom covalently double bonded to two oxygen atoms. It is found in a gas state at room temperature and at normally-encountered concentrations it is odorless. As the source of carbon in the carbon cycle, atmospheric CO_{2} is the primary carbon source for life on Earth. In the air, carbon dioxide is transparent to visible light but absorbs infrared radiation, acting as a greenhouse gas. Carbon dioxide is soluble in water and is found in groundwater, lakes, ice caps, and seawater.

It is a trace gas in Earth's atmosphere at 428 parts per million (ppm), (Note: where "part" here means per molecule) or about 0.043% (as of July 2025) having risen from pre-industrial levels of 280 ppm or about 0.028%. Burning fossil fuels is the main cause of these increased CO_{2} concentrations, which are the primary cause of climate change.

Its concentration in Earth's pre-industrial atmosphere since late in the Precambrian was regulated by organisms and geological features. Plants, algae and cyanobacteria use energy from sunlight to synthesize carbohydrates from carbon dioxide and water in a process called photosynthesis, which produces oxygen as a waste product. In turn, oxygen is consumed and CO_{2} is released as waste by all aerobic organisms when they metabolize organic compounds to produce energy by respiration. CO_{2} is released from organic materials when they decay or combust, such as in forest fires. When carbon dioxide dissolves in water, it forms carbonate and mainly bicarbonate (HCO_{3}^{–}), which causes ocean acidification as atmospheric CO_{2} levels increase.

Carbon dioxide is 53% denser than dry air, but is long-lived and thoroughly mixes in the atmosphere. About half of excess CO_{2} emissions to the atmosphere are absorbed by land and ocean carbon sinks. These sinks can become saturated and are volatile, as decay and wildfires result in the CO_{2} being released back into the atmosphere. CO_{2}, or the carbon it holds, is eventually sequestered (stored for the long term) in rocks and organic deposits like coal, petroleum and natural gas.

Nearly all CO_{2} produced by humans goes into the atmosphere. Less than 1% of CO_{2} produced annually is put to commercial use, mostly in the fertilizer industry and in the oil and gas industry for enhanced oil recovery. Other commercial applications include food and beverage production, metal fabrication, cooling, fire suppression and stimulating plant growth in greenhouses.

== Chemical and physical properties ==
=== Structure, bonding and molecular vibrations ===
The symmetry of a carbon dioxide molecule is linear and centrosymmetric at its equilibrium geometry. The length of the carbon–oxygen bond in carbon dioxide is 116.3 pm, noticeably shorter than the roughly 140 pm length of a typical single C–O bond, and shorter than most other C–O multiply bonded functional groups such as carbonyls. Since it is centrosymmetric, the molecule has no electric dipole moment.

Stretching and bending oscillations of the CO_{2} molecule. Upper left: symmetric stretching. Upper right: antisymmetric stretching. Lower line: degenerate pair of bending modes.

Carbon dioxide molecules undergo significant vibrational motion at room temperature. As a linear triatomic molecule, CO_{2} has four vibrational modes as shown in the diagram. In the symmetric and the antisymmetric stretching modes, the atoms move along the axis of the molecule. There are two bending modes, which are degenerate, meaning that they have the same frequency and same energy, because of the symmetry of the molecule. When a molecule touches a surface or touches another molecule, the two bending modes can differ in frequency because the interaction is different for the two modes. Some of the vibrational modes are observed in the infrared (IR) spectrum: the antisymmetric stretching mode at wavenumber 2349 cm^{−1} (wavelength 4.25 μm) and the degenerate pair of bending modes at 667 cm^{−1} (wavelength 15.0 μm). The symmetric stretching mode does not create an electric dipole so is not observed in IR spectroscopy, but it is detected in Raman spectroscopy at 1388 cm^{−1} (wavelength 7.20 μm), with a Fermi resonance doublet at 1285 cm^{−1}.

=== In aqueous solution ===
Carbon dioxide is soluble in water, in which it reversibly forms H_{2}CO_{3} (carbonic acid), which is a weak acid, because its ionization in water is incomplete.

CO_{2} + H_{2}O ⇌ H_{2}CO_{3}

The hydration equilibrium constant of carbonic acid is, at 25 °C:

$$K_\mathrm{h} = \frac{\ce{[H2CO3]}}{\ce{[CO2_{(aq)}]}} = 1.70 \times 10^{-3}$$

Hence, the majority of the carbon dioxide is not converted into carbonic acid, but remains as CO_{2} molecules, not affecting the pH.

The relative concentrations of CO_{2}, H_{2}CO_{3}, and the deprotonated forms HCO_{3}^{–} (bicarbonate) and CO_{3}^{2–} (carbonate) depend on the pH. As shown in a Bjerrum plot, in neutral or slightly alkaline water (pH > 6.5), the bicarbonate form predominates (>50%) becoming the most prevalent (>95%) at the pH of seawater. In very alkaline water (pH > 10.4), the predominant (>50%) form is carbonate. The oceans, being mildly alkaline with typical pH = 8.2–8.5, contain about 120 mg of bicarbonate per liter.

Being diprotic, carbonic acid has two acid dissociation constants, the first one for the dissociation into the bicarbonate (also called hydrogen carbonate) ion (HCO_{3}^{–}):

H_{2}CO_{3} ⇌ H^{+} + HCO_{3}^{–}
K_{a1} = 2.5 × 10^{−4} mol/L; pK_{a1} = 3.6 at 25 °C.

This is the true first acid dissociation constant, defined as

$$K_\mathrm{a1} = \frac{\ce{[HCO3- ][H+]}}{\ce{[H2CO3]}}$$

where the denominator includes only covalently bound H_{2}CO_{3} and does not include hydrated CO_{2}(aq). The much smaller and often-quoted value near 4.16 × 10^{−7} (or pK_{a1} = 6.38) is an apparent value calculated on the (incorrect) assumption that all dissolved CO_{2} is present as carbonic acid, so that

$$K_\mathrm{a1}{\rm{(apparent)}}=\frac{\ce{[HCO3- ][H+]}}{\ce{[H2CO3] + [CO2_{(aq)}]}}$$

Since most of the dissolved CO_{2} remains as CO_{2} molecules, K_{a1}(apparent) has a much larger denominator and a much smaller value than the true K_{a1}.

The bicarbonate ion is an amphoteric species that can act as an acid or as a base, depending on pH of the solution. At high pH, it dissociates significantly into the carbonate ion (CO_{3}^{2–}):

HCO_{3}^{–} ⇌ CO_{3}^{2–} + H^{+}
K_{a2} = 4.69 × 10^{−11} mol/L; pK_{a2} = 10.329

In organisms, carbonic acid production is catalysed by the enzyme known as carbonic anhydrase.

In addition to altering its acidity, the presence of carbon dioxide in water also affects its electrical properties.

Electrical conductivity of carbondioxide saturated desalinated water when heated from 20 to 98 °C. The shadowed regions indicate the error bars associated with the measurements. A comparison with the temperature dependence of vented desalinated water can be found here .

When carbon dioxide dissolves in desalinated water, the electrical conductivity increases significantly from below 1 μS/cm to nearly 30 μS/cm. When heated, the water begins to gradually lose the conductivity induced by the presence of $\mathrm{CO_{2}}$ , especially noticeable as temperatures exceed 30 °C.

The temperature dependence of the electrical conductivity of fully deionized water without CO_{2} saturation is comparably low in relation to these data.

=== Chemical reactions ===
CO_{2} is a potent electrophile having an electrophilic reactivity that is comparable to benzaldehyde or strongly electrophilic α,β-unsaturated carbonyl compounds. However, unlike electrophiles of similar reactivity, the reactions of nucleophiles with CO_{2} are thermodynamically less favored and are often found to be highly reversible. The reversible reaction of carbon dioxide with amines to make carbamates is used in CO_{2} scrubbers and has been suggested as a possible starting point for carbon capture and storage by amine gas treating. Only very strong nucleophiles, like the carbanions provided by Grignard reagents and organolithium compounds react with CO_{2} to give carboxylates:

MR + CO_{2} → RCO_{2}M
where M = Li or MgBr and R = alkyl or aryl.

In metal carbon dioxide complexes, CO_{2} serves as a ligand, which can facilitate the conversion of CO_{2} to other chemicals.

The reduction of CO_{2} to CO is ordinarily a difficult and slow reaction:

CO_{2} + 2 e^{−} + 2 H^{+} → CO + H_{2}O

The redox potential for this reaction near pH 7 is about −0.53 V versus the standard hydrogen electrode. The nickel-containing enzyme carbon monoxide dehydrogenase catalyses this process.

Photoautotrophs (i.e. plants and cyanobacteria) use the energy contained in sunlight to photosynthesize simple sugars from CO_{2} absorbed from the air and water:

n CO_{2} + n H_{2}O → (CH_{2}O)_{n} + n O_{2}

=== Physical properties ===
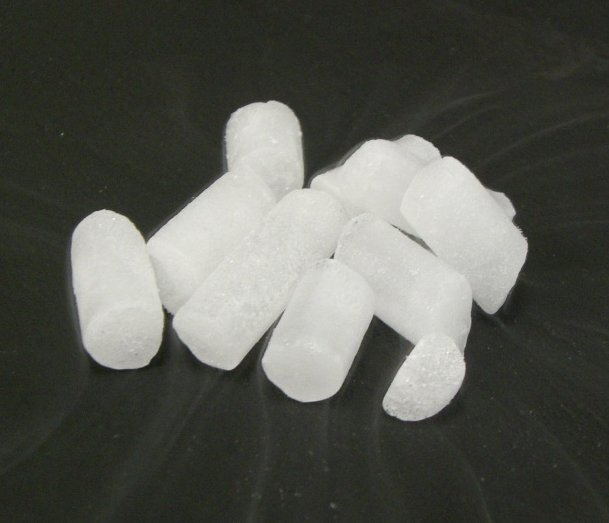
Pellets of "dry ice", a common form of solid carbon dioxide

Carbon dioxide is colorless. At low concentrations, the gas is odorless; however, at sufficiently high concentrations, it has a sharp, acidic odor. At standard temperature and pressure, the density of carbon dioxide is around 1.98 kg/m^{3}, about 1.53 times that of air.

Carbon dioxide has no liquid state at pressures below 0.51795(10) MPa (5.11177(99) atm). At a pressure of 1 atm (0.101325 MPa), the gas deposits directly to a solid at temperatures below 194.6855(30) K (−78.4645(30) °C) and the solid sublimes directly to a gas above this temperature. In its solid state, carbon dioxide is commonly called dry ice.

Pressure–temperature phase diagram of carbon dioxide. Note that it is a log-lin chart.

Liquid carbon dioxide forms only at pressures above 0.51795(10) MPa (5.11177(99) atm); the triple point of carbon dioxide is 216.592(3) K (−56.558(3) °C) at 0.51795(10) MPa (5.11177(99) atm) (see phase diagram). The critical point is 304.128(15) K (30.978(15) °C) at 7.3773(30) MPa (72.808(30) atm). Another form of solid carbon dioxide observed at high pressure is an amorphous glass-like solid. This form of glass, called carbonia, is produced by supercooling heated CO_{2} at extreme pressures (40–48 GPa, or about 400,000 atmospheres) in a diamond anvil. This discovery confirmed the theory that carbon dioxide could exist in a glass state similar to other members of its elemental family, like silicon dioxide (silica glass) and germanium dioxide. Unlike silica and germania glasses, however, carbonia glass is not stable at normal pressures and reverts to gas when pressure is released.

At temperatures and pressures above the critical point, carbon dioxide behaves as a supercritical fluid known as supercritical carbon dioxide.

Table of thermal and physical properties of saturated liquid carbon dioxide:

| Temperature (°C) | Density (kg/m^{3}) | Specific heat (kJ/(kg⋅K)) | Kinematic viscosity (m^{2}/s) | Thermal conductivity (W/(m⋅K)) | Thermal diffusivity (m^{2}/s) | Prandtl Number |
|---|---|---|---|---|---|---|
| −50 | 1156.34 | 1.84 | 1.19 × 10^{−7} | 0.0855 | 4.02 × 10^{−8} | 2.96 |
| −40 | 1117.77 | 1.88 | 1.18 × 10^{−7} | 0.1011 | 4.81 × 10^{−8} | 2.46 |
| −30 | 1076.76 | 1.97 | 1.17 × 10^{−7} | 0.1116 | 5.27 × 10^{−8} | 2.22 |
| −20 | 1032.39 | 2.05 | 1.15 × 10^{−7} | 0.1151 | 5.45 × 10^{−8} | 2.12 |
| −10 | 983.38 | 2.18 | 1.13 × 10^{−7} | 0.1099 | 5.13 × 10^{−8} | 2.2 |
| 0 | 926.99 | 2.47 | 1.08 × 10^{−7} | 0.1045 | 4.58 × 10^{−8} | 2.38 |
| 10 | 860.03 | 3.14 | 1.01 × 10^{−7} | 0.0971 | 3.61 × 10^{−8} | 2.8 |
| 20 | 772.57 | 5 | 9.10 × 10^{−8} | 0.0872 | 2.22 × 10^{−8} | 4.1 |
| 30 | 597.81 | 36.4 | 8.00 × 10^{−8} | 0.0703 | 0.279 × 10^{−8} | 28.7 |

Table of thermal and physical properties of carbon dioxide (CO_{2}) at atmospheric pressure:

| Temperature (K) | Density (kg/m^{3}) | Specific heat (kJ/(kg⋅°C)) | Dynamic viscosity (kg/(m⋅s)) | Kinematic viscosity (m^{2}/s) | Thermal conductivity (W/(m⋅°C)) | Thermal diffusivity (m^{2}/s) | Prandtl Number |
|---|---|---|---|---|---|---|---|
| 220 | 2.4733 | 0.783 | 1.11 × 10^{−5} | 4.49 × 10^{−6} | 0.010805 | 5.92 × 10^{−6} | 0.818 |
| 250 | 2.1657 | 0.804 | 1.26 × 10^{−5} | 5.81 × 10^{−6} | 0.012884 | 7.40 × 10^{−6} | 0.793 |
| 300 | 1.7973 | 0.871 | 1.50 × 10^{−5} | 8.32 × 10^{−6} | 0.016572 | 1.06 × 10^{−5} | 0.77 |
| 350 | 1.5362 | 0.9 | 1.72 × 10^{−5} | 1.12 × 10^{−5} | 0.02047 | 1.48 × 10^{−5} | 0.755 |
| 400 | 1.3424 | 0.942 | 1.93 × 10^{−5} | 1.44 × 10^{−5} | 0.02461 | 1.95 × 10^{−5} | 0.738 |
| 450 | 1.1918 | 0.98 | 2.13 × 10^{−5} | 1.79 × 10^{−5} | 0.02897 | 2.48 × 10^{−5} | 0.721 |
| 500 | 1.0732 | 1.013 | 2.33 × 10^{−5} | 2.17 × 10^{−5} | 0.03352 | 3.08 × 10^{−5} | 0.702 |
| 550 | 0.9739 | 1.047 | 2.51 × 10^{−5} | 2.57 × 10^{−5} | 0.03821 | 3.75 × 10^{−5} | 0.685 |
| 600 | 0.8938 | 1.076 | 2.68 × 10^{−5} | 3.00 × 10^{−5} | 0.04311 | 4.48 × 10^{−5} | 0.668 |
| 650 | 0.8143 | 1.1 | 2.88 × 10^{−5} | 3.54 × 10^{−5} | 0.0445 | 4.97 × 10^{−5} | 0.712 |
| 700 | 0.7564 | 1.13 | 3.05 × 10^{−5} | 4.03 × 10^{−5} | 0.0481 | 5.63 × 10^{−5} | 0.717 |
| 750 | 0.7057 | 1.15 | 3.21 × 10^{−5} | 4.55 × 10^{−5} | 0.0517 | 6.37 × 10^{−5} | 0.714 |
| 800 | 0.6614 | 1.17 | 3.37 × 10^{−5} | 5.10 × 10^{−5} | 0.0551 | 7.12 × 10^{−5} | 0.716 |

== Biological role ==
Carbon dioxide is an end product of cellular respiration in organisms that obtain energy by breaking down sugars, fats and amino acids with oxygen as part of their metabolism. This includes all plants, algae and animals and aerobic fungi and bacteria. In vertebrates, the carbon dioxide travels in the blood from the body's tissues to the skin (e.g., amphibians) or the gills (e.g., fish), from where it dissolves in the water, or to the lungs from where it is exhaled. During active photosynthesis, plants can absorb more carbon dioxide from the atmosphere than they release in respiration.

=== Photosynthesis and carbon fixation ===
Overview of the Calvin cycle and carbon fixation

Carbon fixation is a biochemical process by which atmospheric carbon dioxide is incorporated by plants, algae and cyanobacteria into energy-rich organic molecules such as glucose, thus creating their own food by photosynthesis. Photosynthesis uses carbon dioxide and water to produce sugars from which other organic compounds can be constructed, and oxygen is produced as a by-product.

Ribulose-1,5-bisphosphate carboxylase oxygenase, commonly abbreviated to RuBisCO, is the enzyme involved in the first major step of carbon fixation, the production of two molecules of 3-phosphoglycerate from CO_{2} and ribulose bisphosphate, as shown in the diagram at left.

RuBisCO is thought to be the single most abundant protein on Earth.

Phototrophs use the products of their photosynthesis as internal food sources and as raw material for the biosynthesis of more complex organic molecules, such as polysaccharides, nucleic acids, and proteins. These are used for their own growth, and also as the basis of the food chains and webs that feed other organisms, including animals such as ourselves. Some important phototrophs, the coccolithophores synthesise hard calcium carbonate scales. A globally significant species of coccolithophore is Emiliania huxleyi whose calcite scales have formed the basis of many sedimentary rocks such as limestone, where what was previously atmospheric carbon can remain fixed for geological timescales.

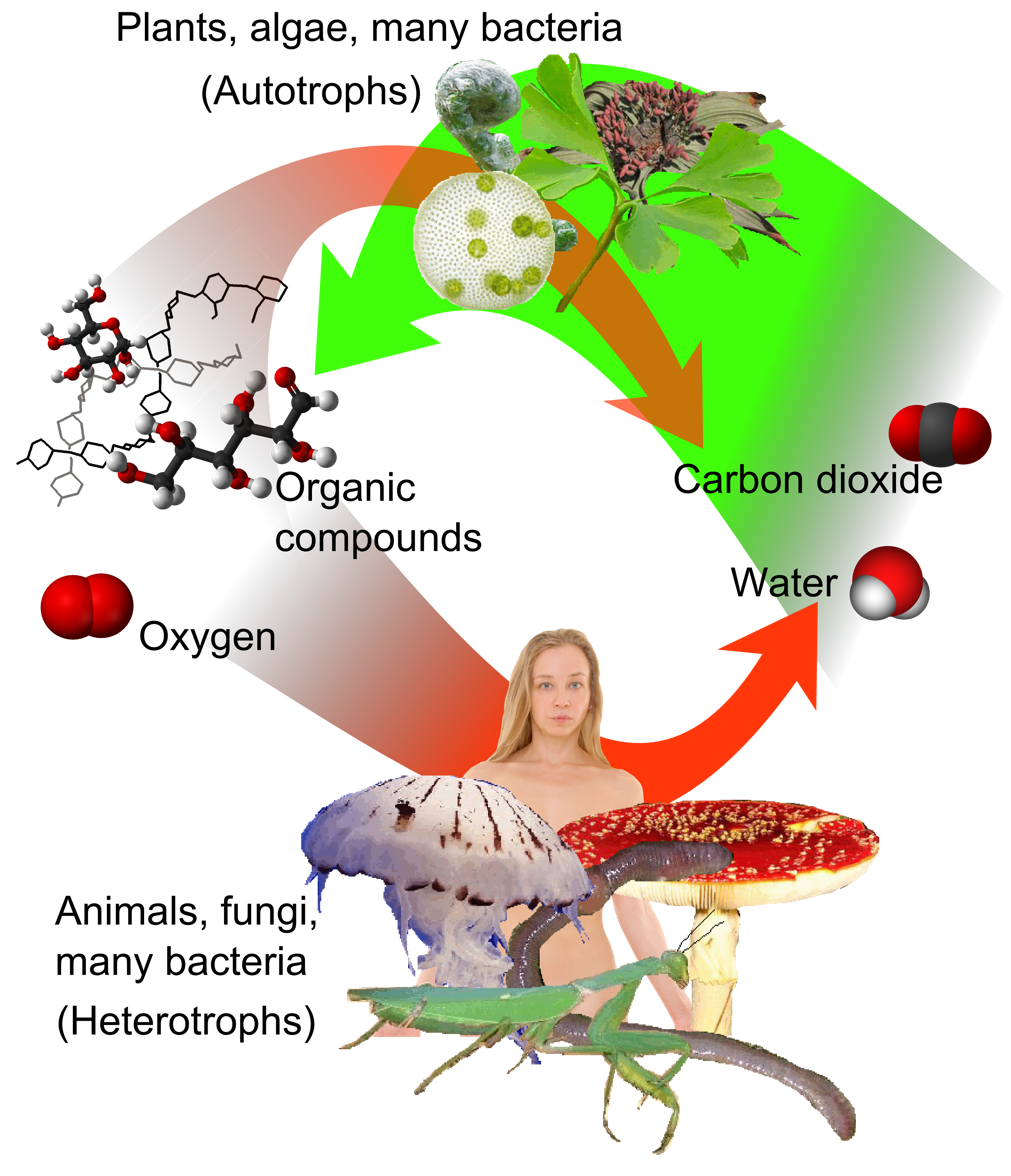
Overview of photosynthesis and respiration. Carbon dioxide (at right), together with water, form oxygen and organic compounds (at left) by photosynthesis (green), which can be respired (red) to water and CO_{2}.

For most greenhouse crops, the rate of photosynthesis is about 50% greater in a concentration of 1,000 ppm CO_{2} when compared with 340 ppm (the ambient level in about 1980), assuming no other changes in climate or limitations on other nutrients. Elevated CO_{2} levels cause increased growth reflected in the harvestable yield of crops, with wheat, rice and soybean all showing increases in yield of 12–14% under elevated CO_{2} in FACE experiments.

Increased atmospheric CO_{2} concentrations result in fewer stomata developing on plants which leads to reduced water usage and increased water-use efficiency. Studies using FACE have shown that CO_{2} enrichment leads to decreased concentrations of micronutrients in crop plants. This may have knock-on effects on other parts of ecosystems as herbivores will need to eat more food to gain the same amount of protein.

The concentration of secondary metabolites such as phenylpropanoids and flavonoids can also be altered in plants exposed to high concentrations of CO_{2}.

Plants also emit CO_{2} during respiration, and so the majority of plants and algae, which use C3 photosynthesis, are only net absorbers during the day. Though a growing forest will absorb many tons of CO_{2} each year, a mature forest will produce as much CO_{2} from respiration and decomposition of dead specimens (e.g., fallen branches) as is used in photosynthesis in growing plants. Contrary to the long-standing view that they are carbon neutral, mature forests can continue to accumulate carbon and remain valuable carbon sinks, helping to maintain the carbon balance of Earth's atmosphere. Additionally, and crucially to life on earth, photosynthesis by phytoplankton consumes dissolved CO_{2} in the upper ocean and thereby promotes the absorption of CO_{2} from the atmosphere.

=== Toxicity ===
Symptoms of carbon dioxide toxicity, by increasing volume percent in air

Carbon dioxide content in fresh air (averaged between sea-level and 10 kPa level, i.e., about 30 km (19 mi) altitude) varies between 0.036% (360 ppm) and 0.041% (412 ppm), depending on the location.

In humans, exposure to CO_{2} at concentrations greater than 5% causes the development of hypercapnia and respiratory acidosis. Concentrations of 7% to 10% (70,000 to 100,000 ppm) may cause suffocation, even in the presence of sufficient oxygen, manifesting as dizziness, headache, visual and hearing dysfunction, and unconsciousness within a few minutes to an hour. Concentrations of more than 10% may cause convulsions, coma, and death. CO_{2} levels of more than 30% act rapidly leading to loss of consciousness in seconds.

Because it is heavier than air, in locations where the gas seeps from the ground (due to sub-surface volcanic or geothermal activity) in relatively high concentrations, without the dispersing effects of wind, it can collect in sheltered/pocketed locations below average ground level, causing animals located therein to be suffocated. Carrion feeders attracted to the carcasses are then also killed. Children have been killed in the same way near the city of Goma by CO_{2} emissions from the nearby volcano Mount Nyiragongo. The Swahili term for this phenomenon is mazuku.

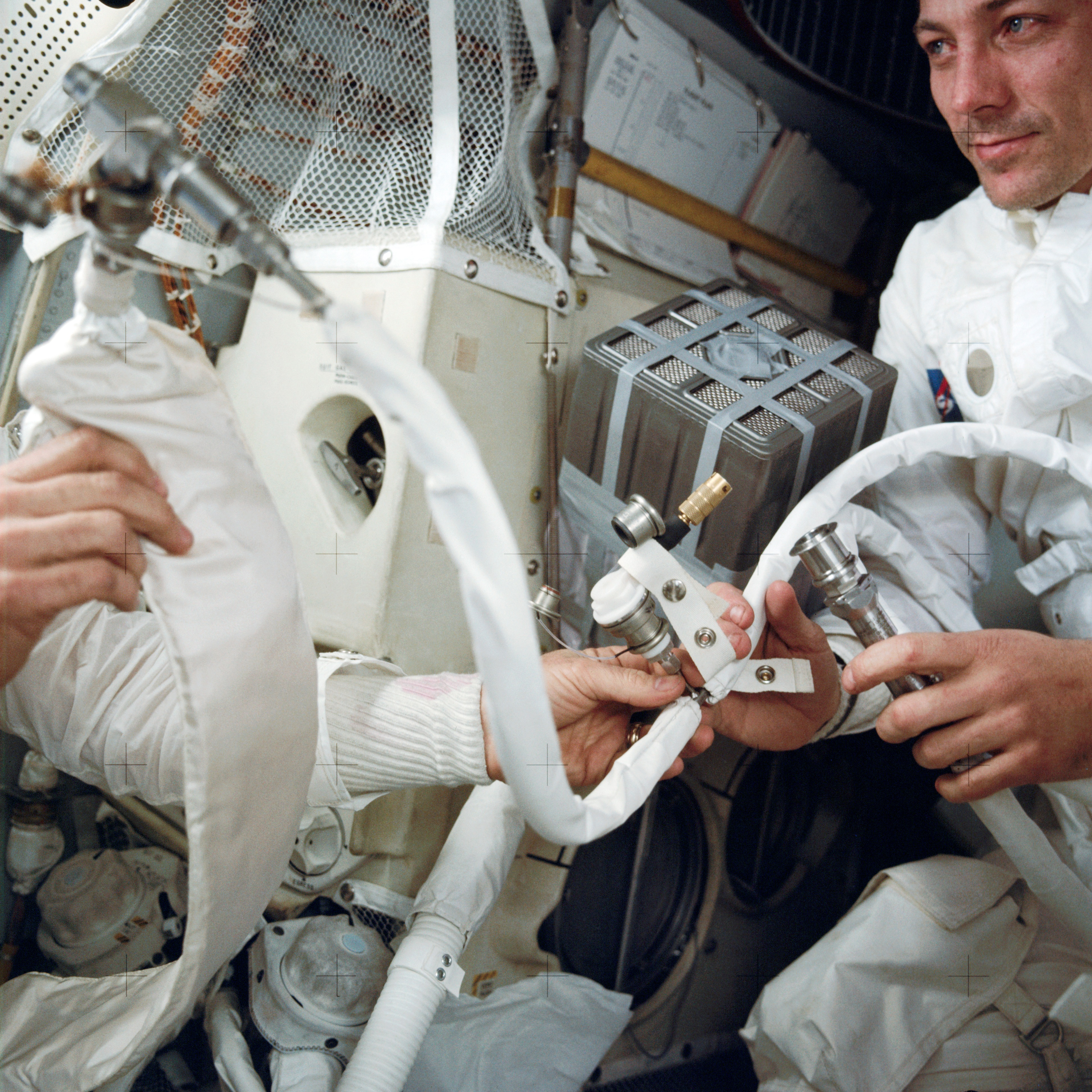
Rising levels of CO_{2} threatened the Apollo 13 astronauts, who had to adapt cartridges from the command module to supply the carbon dioxide scrubber in the Apollo Lunar Module, which they used as a lifeboat.

Adaptation to increased concentrations of CO_{2} occurs in humans, including modified breathing and kidney bicarbonate production, in order to balance the effects of blood acidification (acidosis). Several studies suggested that 2.0 percent inspired concentrations could be used for closed air spaces (e.g. a submarine) since the adaptation is physiological and reversible, as deterioration in performance or in normal physical activity does not happen at this level of exposure for five days. Yet, other studies show a decrease in cognitive function even at much lower levels. Also, with ongoing respiratory acidosis, adaptation or compensatory mechanisms will be unable to reverse the condition.

==== Below 1% ====
There are few studies of the health effects of long-term continuous CO_{2} exposure on humans and animals at levels below 1%. Occupational CO_{2} exposure limits have been set in the United States at 0.5% (5000 ppm) for an eight-hour period. At this CO_{2} concentration, International Space Station crew experienced headaches, lethargy, mental slowness, emotional irritation, and sleep disruption. Studies in animals at 0.5% CO_{2} have demonstrated kidney calcification and bone loss after eight weeks of exposure. A study of humans exposed in 2.5 hour sessions demonstrated significant negative effects on cognitive abilities at concentrations as low as 0.1% (1000 ppm) CO_{2} likely due to CO_{2} induced increases in cerebral blood flow. Another study observed a decline in basic activity level and information usage at 1000 ppm, when compared to 500 ppm.

However a review of the literature found that a reliable subset of studies on the phenomenon of carbon dioxide induced cognitive impairment to only show a small effect on high-level decision making (for concentrations below 5000 ppm). Most of the studies were confounded by inadequate study designs, environmental comfort, uncertainties in exposure doses and differing cognitive assessments used. Similarly a study on the effects of the concentration of CO_{2} in motorcycle helmets has been criticized for having dubious methodology in not noting the self-reports of motorcycle riders and taking measurements using mannequins. Further when normal motorcycle conditions were achieved (such as highway or city speeds) or the visor was raised the concentration of CO_{2} declined to safe levels (0.2%).

Typical CO_{2} concentration effects
| Concentration | Note |
|---|---|
| 280 ppm | Pre-industrial levels |
| 421 ppm | Current (May 2022) levels |
| ~1121 ppm | ASHRAE recommendation for indoor air |
| 5,000 ppm | USA 8h exposure limit |
| 10,000 ppm | Cognitive impairment, Canada's long term exposure limit |
| 10,000-20,000 ppm | Drowsiness |
| 20,000-50,000 ppm | Headaches, sleepiness; poor concentration, loss of attention, slight nausea also possible |

==== Ventilation ====
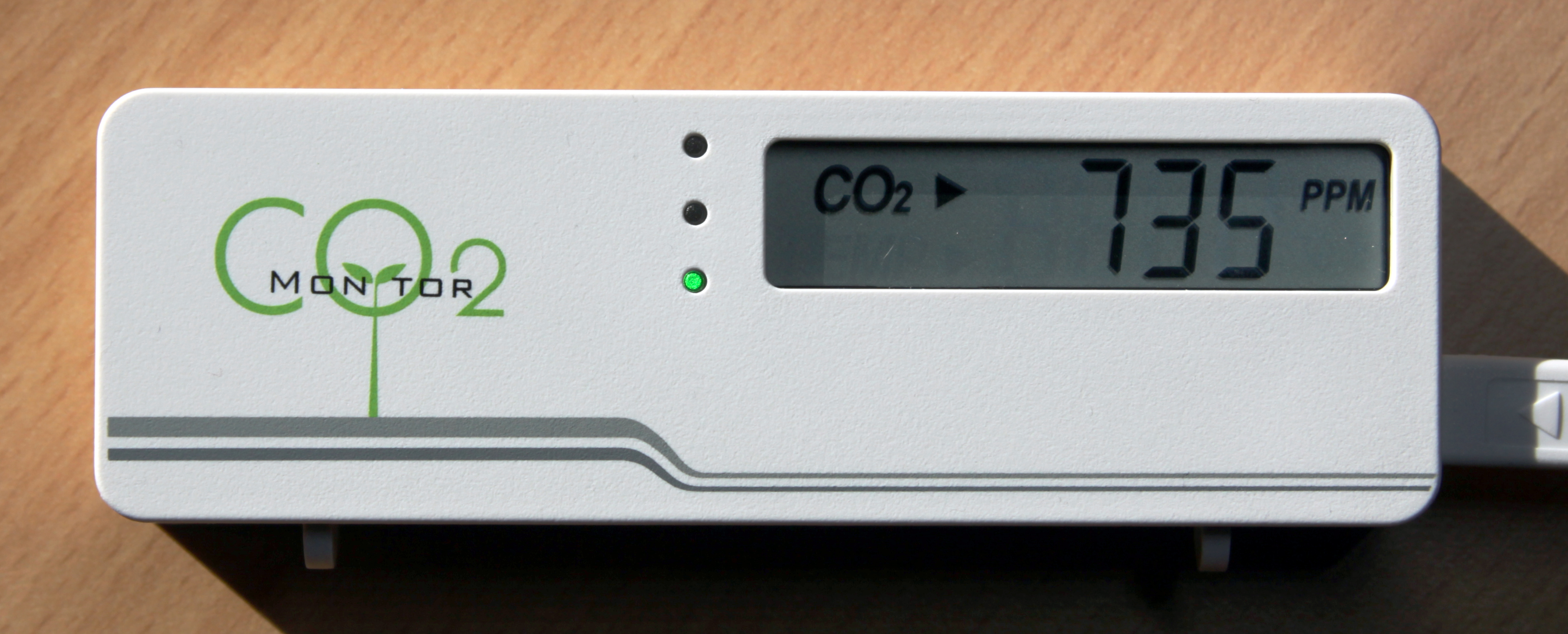
A carbon dioxide sensor that measures CO_{2} concentration using a nondispersive infrared sensor

Poor ventilation is one of the main causes of excessive CO_{2} concentrations in closed spaces, leading to poor indoor air quality. Carbon dioxide differential above outdoor concentrations at steady state conditions (when the occupancy and ventilation system operation are sufficiently long that CO_{2} concentration has stabilized) are sometimes used to estimate ventilation rates per person. Higher CO_{2} concentrations are associated with occupant health, comfort and performance degradation. ASHRAE Standard 62.1–2007 ventilation rates may result in indoor concentrations up to 2,100 ppm above ambient outdoor conditions. Thus if the outdoor concentration is 400 ppm, indoor concentrations may reach 2,500 ppm with ventilation rates that meet this industry consensus standard. Concentrations in poorly ventilated spaces can be found even higher than this (range of 3,000 or 4,000 ppm).

Miners, who are particularly vulnerable to gas exposure due to insufficient ventilation, referred to mixtures of carbon dioxide and nitrogen as "blackdamp", "choke damp" or "stythe". Before more effective technologies were developed, miners would frequently monitor for dangerous levels of blackdamp and other gases in mine shafts by bringing a caged canary with them as they worked. The canary is more sensitive to asphyxiant gases than humans, and as it became unconscious would stop singing and fall off its perch. The Davy lamp could also detect high levels of blackdamp (which sinks, and collects near the floor) by burning less brightly, while methane, another suffocating gas and explosion risk, would make the lamp burn more brightly.

In February 2020, three people died from suffocation at a party in Moscow when dry ice (frozen CO_{2}) was added to a swimming pool to cool it down. A similar accident occurred in 2018 when a woman died from CO_{2} fumes emanating from the large amount of dry ice she was transporting in her car.

==== Indoor air ====
Humans spend more and more time in a confined atmosphere (around 80-90% of the time in a building or vehicle). According to the French Agency for Food, Environmental and Occupational Health & Safety (ANSES) and various actors in France, the CO_{2} rate in the indoor air of buildings (linked to human or animal occupancy and the presence of combustion installations), weighted by air renewal, is "usually between about 350 and 2,500 ppm".

In homes, schools, nurseries and offices, there are no systematic relationships between the levels of CO_{2} and other pollutants, and indoor CO_{2} is statistically not a good predictor of pollutants linked to outdoor road (or air, etc.) traffic. CO_{2} is the parameter that changes the fastest (with hygrometry and oxygen levels when humans or animals are gathered in a closed or poorly ventilated room). In poor countries, many open hearths are sources of CO_{2} and CO emitted directly into the living environment.

==== Outdoor areas with elevated concentrations ====
Local concentrations of carbon dioxide can reach high values near strong sources, especially those that are isolated by surrounding terrain. At the Bossoleto hot spring near Rapolano Terme in Tuscany, Italy, situated in a bowl-shaped depression about 100 m (330 ft) in diameter, concentrations of CO_{2} rise to above 75% overnight, sufficient to kill insects and small animals. After sunrise the gas is dispersed by convection. High concentrations of CO_{2} produced by disturbance of deep lake water saturated with CO_{2} are thought to have caused 37 fatalities at Lake Monoun, Cameroon in 1984 and 1700 casualties at Lake Nyos, Cameroon in 1986.

== Human physiology ==
=== Content ===
Reference ranges or averages for partial pressures of carbon dioxide (abbreviated pCO_{2})
| Blood compartment | (kPa) | (mm Hg) |
|---|---|---|
| Venous blood carbon dioxide | 5.5–6.8 | 41–51 |
| Alveolar pulmonary gas pressures | 4.8 | 36 |
| Arterial blood carbon dioxide | 4.7–6.0 | 35–45 |

The body produces approximately 2.3 pounds (1.0 kg) of carbon dioxide per day per person, containing 0.63 pounds (290 g) of carbon. In humans, this carbon dioxide is carried through the venous system and is breathed out through the lungs, resulting in lower concentrations in the arteries. The carbon dioxide content of the blood is often given as the partial pressure, which is the pressure which carbon dioxide would have had if it alone occupied the volume. In humans, the blood carbon dioxide contents are shown in the adjacent table.

=== Transport in the blood ===
CO_{2} is carried in blood in three different ways. Exact percentages vary between arterial and venous blood.

- Majority (about 70% to 80%) is converted to bicarbonate ions (HCO_{3}^{–}) by the enzyme carbonic anhydrase in the red blood cells, by the reaction:

CO_{2} + H_{2}O → H_{2}CO_{3} → H^{+} + HCO_{3}^{–}

- 5–10% is dissolved in blood plasma
- 5–10% is bound to hemoglobin as carbamino compounds

Hemoglobin, the main oxygen-carrying molecule in red blood cells, carries both oxygen and carbon dioxide. However, the CO_{2} bound to hemoglobin does not bind to the same site as oxygen. Instead, it combines with the N-terminal groups on the four globin chains. However, because of allosteric effects on the hemoglobin molecule, the binding of CO_{2} decreases the amount of oxygen that is bound for a given partial pressure of oxygen. This is known as the Haldane Effect, and is important in the transport of carbon dioxide from the tissues to the lungs. Conversely, a rise in the partial pressure of CO_{2} or a lower pH will cause offloading of oxygen from hemoglobin, which is known as the Bohr effect.

=== Regulation of respiration ===
Carbon dioxide is one of the mediators of local autoregulation of blood supply. If its concentration is high, the capillaries expand to allow a greater blood flow to that tissue.

Bicarbonate ions are crucial for regulating blood pH. A person's breathing rate influences the level of CO_{2} in their blood. Breathing that is too slow or shallow causes respiratory acidosis, while breathing that is too rapid leads to hyperventilation, which can cause respiratory alkalosis.

Although the body requires oxygen for metabolism, low oxygen levels normally do not stimulate breathing. Rather, breathing is stimulated by higher carbon dioxide levels. As a result, breathing low-pressure air or a gas mixture with no oxygen at all (such as pure nitrogen) can lead to loss of consciousness without ever experiencing air hunger. This is especially perilous for high-altitude fighter pilots. It is also why flight attendants instruct passengers, in case of loss of cabin pressure, to apply the oxygen mask to themselves first before helping others; otherwise, one risks losing consciousness.

The respiratory centers try to maintain an arterial CO_{2} pressure of 40 mmHg. With intentional hyperventilation, the CO_{2} content of arterial blood may be lowered to 10–20 mmHg (the oxygen content of the blood is little affected), and the respiratory drive is diminished. This is why one can hold one's breath longer after hyperventilating than without hyperventilating. This carries the risk that unconsciousness may result before the need to breathe becomes overwhelming, which is why hyperventilation is particularly dangerous before free diving.

== Concentrations and role in the environment ==
=== Atmosphere ===
Atmospheric CO_{2} concentration measured at Mauna Loa Observatory in Hawaii from 1958 to 2023 (also called the Keeling Curve). The rise in CO_{2} over that time period is clearly visible. The concentration is expressed as μmole per mole, or ppm.

In the atmosphere of Earth, carbon dioxide (CO_{2}) is a trace gas that plays an integral part in the greenhouse effect, carbon cycle, photosynthesis, and oceanic carbon cycle. It is one of three main greenhouse gases in the atmosphere of Earth. In 2026, the concentration of carbon dioxide in the atmosphere reached 432 ppm or 0.0432% (on a molar basis), representing a mass of 3380 gigatonnes. This is an increase of 54% since the start of the Industrial Revolution, up from 280 ppm during the 10,000 years prior to the mid-18th century. The increase is due to human activity.

The current increase in CO_{2} concentrations is primarily driven by the burning of fossil fuels. Other significant human activities that emit CO_{2} include cement production, deforestation, and biomass burning. The increase in atmospheric concentrations of CO_{2} and other long-lived greenhouse gases such as methane increase the absorption and emission of infrared radiation by the atmosphere. This has led to a rise in average global temperature and ocean acidification. Another direct effect is the CO_{2} fertilization effect. The increase in atmospheric concentrations of CO_{2} causes a range of further effects of climate change on the environment and human living conditions.

Carbon dioxide is a greenhouse gas. It absorbs and emits infrared radiation at its two infrared-active vibrational frequencies. The two wavelengths are 4.26 μm (2,347 cm^{−1}) (antisymmetric stretching vibrational mode) and 14.99 μm (667 cm^{−1}) (bending vibrational mode). CO_{2} plays a significant role in influencing Earth's surface temperature through the greenhouse effect. Light emission from the Earth's surface is most intense in the infrared region between 200 and 2500 cm^{−1}, as opposed to light emission from the much hotter Sun which is most intense in the visible region. Absorption of infrared light at the vibrational frequencies of atmospheric CO_{2} traps energy near the surface, warming the surface of Earth and its lower atmosphere. Less energy reaches the upper atmosphere, which is therefore cooler because of this absorption.

The present atmospheric concentration of CO_{2} is the highest for 14 million years. Concentrations of CO_{2} in the atmosphere were as high as 4,000 ppm during the Cambrian period about 500 million years ago, and as low as 180 ppm during the Quaternary glaciation of the last two million years. Reconstructed temperature records for the last 420 million years indicate that atmospheric CO_{2} concentrations peaked at approximately 2,000 ppm. This peak happened during the Devonian period (400 million years ago). Another peak occurred in the Triassic period (220–200 million years ago).

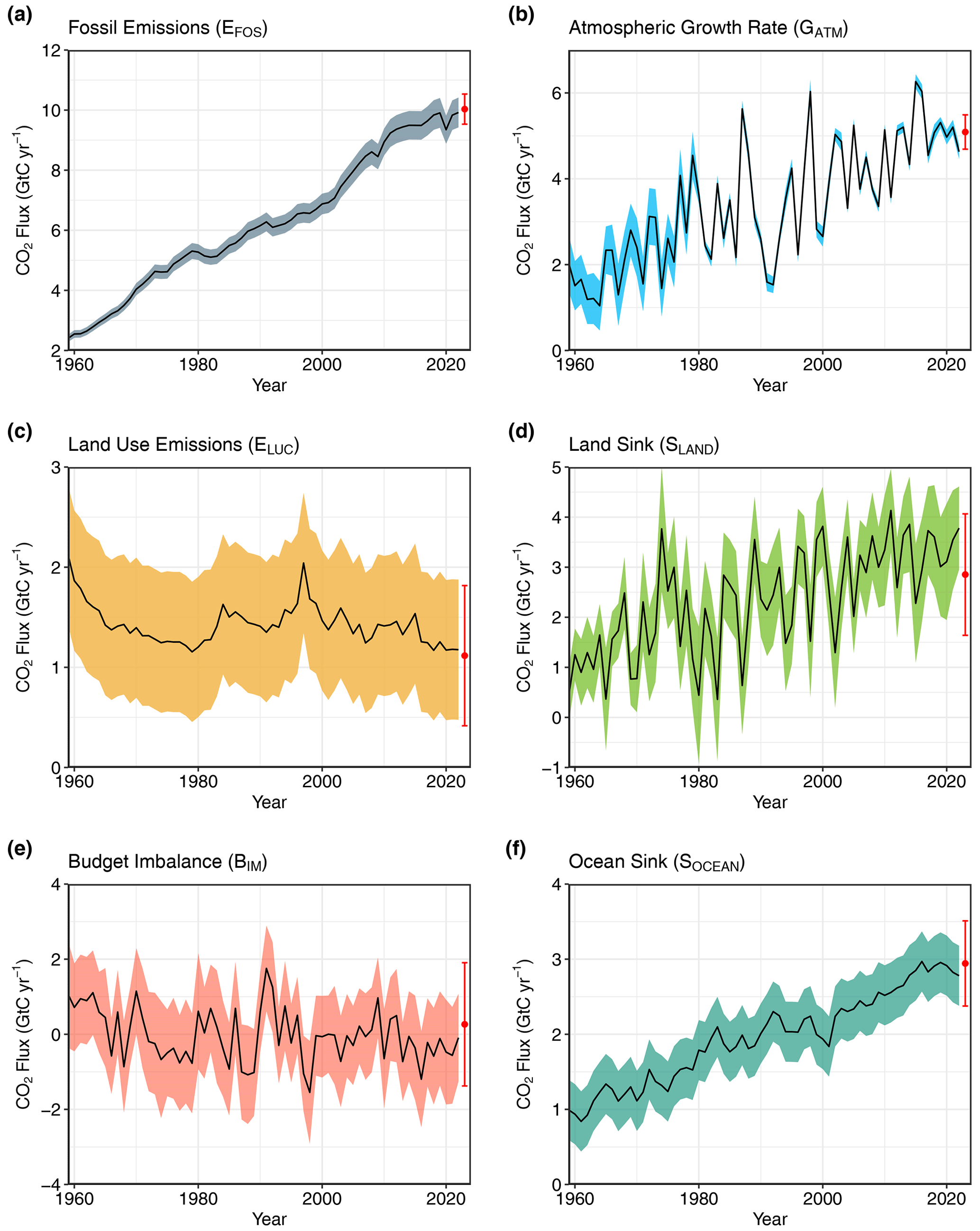
Annual CO_{2} flows from anthropogenic sources (left) into Earth's atmosphere, land, and ocean sinks (right) since the 1960s. Units in equivalent gigatonnes carbon per year.

=== Oceans ===
==== Ocean acidification ====
Carbon dioxide dissolves in the ocean to form carbonic acid (H_{2}CO_{3}), bicarbonate (HCO_{3}^{–}), and carbonate (CO_{3}^{2–}). There is about fifty times as much carbon dioxide dissolved in the oceans as exists in the atmosphere. The oceans act as an enormous carbon sink, and have taken up about a third of CO_{2} emitted by human activity.

Ocean acidification is the ongoing decrease in the pH of the Earth's ocean. Between 1950 and 2026, the average pH of the ocean surface fell from approximately 8.15 to 8.05. Carbon dioxide emissions from human activities are the primary cause of ocean acidification, with atmospheric carbon dioxide (CO_{2}) levels exceeding 422 ppm (as of 2024). CO_{2} from the atmosphere is absorbed by the oceans. This chemical reaction produces carbonic acid (H_{2}CO_{3}) which dissociates into a bicarbonate ion (HCO^{−}_{3}) and a hydrogen ion (H^{+}). The presence of free hydrogen ions (H^{+}) lowers the pH of the ocean, increasing acidity (this does not mean that seawater is acidic yet; It is still alkaline, with a pH higher than 8). Marine calcifying organisms, such as mollusks and corals, are especially vulnerable because they rely on calcium carbonate to build shells and skeletons.

A change in pH by 0.1 represents a 26% increase in hydrogen ion concentration in the world's oceans (the pH scale is logarithmic, so a change of one in pH units is equivalent to a tenfold change in hydrogen ion concentration). Sea-surface pH and carbonate saturation states vary depending on ocean depth and location. Colder and higher latitude waters are capable of absorbing more CO_{2}. This can cause acidity to rise, lowering the pH and carbonate saturation levels in these areas. Several other factors influence the atmosphere-ocean CO_{2} exchange, and thus local ocean acidification. These include ocean currents and upwelling zones, proximity to large continental rivers, sea ice coverage, and atmospheric exchange with nitrogen and sulfur from fossil fuel burning and agriculture.

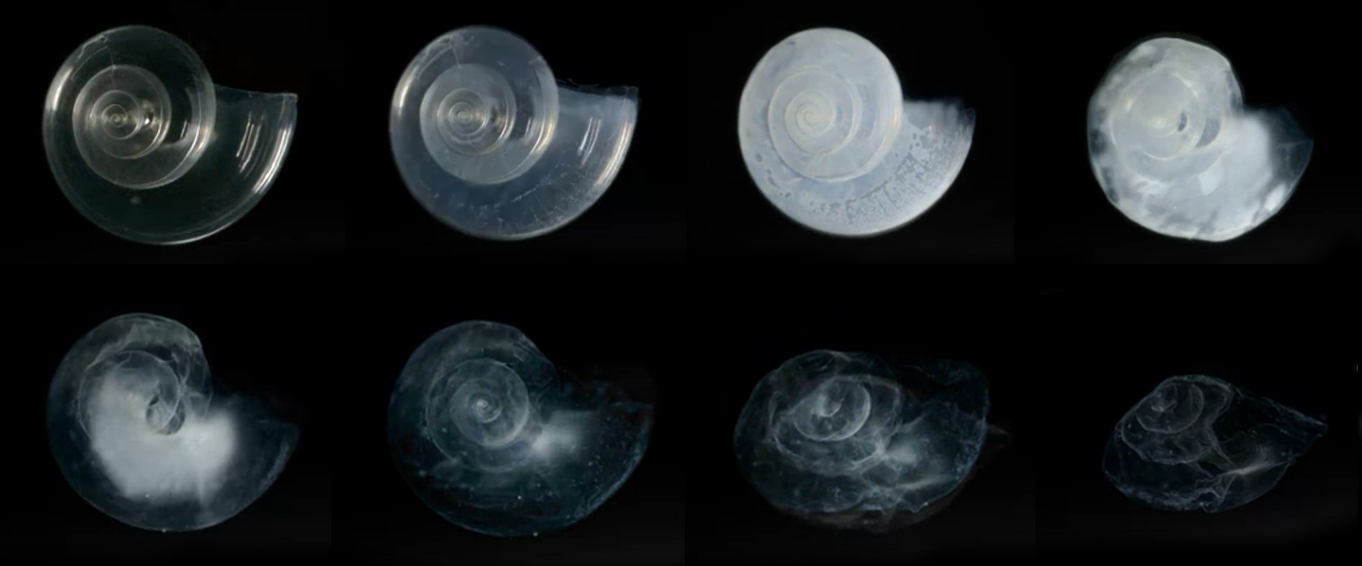
Pterapod shell dissolved in seawater adjusted to an ocean chemistry projected for the year 2100

Changes in ocean chemistry can have extensive direct and indirect effects on organisms and their habitats. One of the most important repercussions of increasing ocean acidity relates to the production of shells out of calcium carbonate (CaCO_{3}). This process is called calcification and is important to the biology and survival of a wide range of marine organisms. Calcification involves the precipitation of dissolved ions into solid CaCO_{3} structures, structures for many marine organisms, such as coccolithophores, foraminifera, crustaceans, mollusks, etc. After they are formed, these CaCO_{3} structures are vulnerable to dissolution unless the surrounding seawater contains saturating concentrations of carbonate ions (CO^{2−}_{3}).

Very little of the extra carbon dioxide that is added into the ocean remains as dissolved carbon dioxide. The majority dissociates into additional bicarbonate and free hydrogen ions. The increase in hydrogen is larger than the increase in bicarbonate, creating an imbalance in the reaction:

HCO^{−}_{3} ⇌ CO^{2−}_{3} + H^{+}

To maintain chemical equilibrium, some of the carbonate ions already in the ocean combine with some of the hydrogen ions to make further bicarbonate. Thus the ocean's concentration of carbonate ions is reduced, removing an essential building block for marine organisms to build shells, or calcify:

Ca^{2+} + CO^{2−}_{3} ⇌ CaCO_{3}

==== Hydrothermal vents ====
Carbon dioxide is also introduced into the oceans through hydrothermal vents. The Champagne hydrothermal vent, found at the Northwest Eifuku volcano in the Mariana Trench, produces almost pure liquid carbon dioxide, one of only two known sites in the world as of 2004, the other being in the Okinawa Trough. The finding of a submarine lake of liquid carbon dioxide in the Okinawa Trough was reported in 2006.

== Sources ==
=== Combustion ===
The burning of fossil fuels for energy produces 36.8 billion tonnes of CO_{2} per year as of 2023. Nearly all of this goes into the atmosphere, where approximately half is subsequently absorbed into natural carbon sinks. Less than 1% of CO_{2} produced annually is put to commercial use.

The combustion of all carbon-based fuels, such as methane (natural gas), petroleum distillates (gasoline, diesel, kerosene, propane), coal, wood and generic organic matter produces carbon dioxide and, except in the case of pure carbon, water. As an example, the chemical reaction between methane and oxygen:

CH_{4} + 2 O_{2} → CO_{2} + 2 H_{2}O

Iron is reduced from its oxides with coke in a blast furnace, producing pig iron and carbon dioxide:

Fe_{2}O_{3} + 3 CO → 3 CO_{2} + 2 Fe

=== Biological processes ===
All aerobic organisms produce CO_{2} when they oxidize carbohydrates, fatty acids, and proteins. The reactions involved are numerous and complex. See cellular respiration, anaerobic respiration and photosynthesis for detailed descriptions. The overall equation for the respiration of glucose and other monosaccharides is:

C_{6}H_{12}O_{6} + 6 O_{2} → 6 CO_{2} + 6 H_{2}O

Carbon dioxide is a by-product of the fermentation of sugar in the brewing of beer, whisky and other alcoholic beverages and in the production of bioethanol. Yeast metabolizes sugar to produce CO_{2} and ethanol, also known as alcohol, as follows:

C_{6}H_{12}O_{6} → 2 CO_{2} + 2 CH_{3}CH_{2}OH

Anaerobic organisms decompose organic material, producing methane and carbon dioxide together with traces of other compounds. Regardless of the type of organic material, the production of gases follows well defined kinetic pattern. Carbon dioxide comprises about 40–45% of the gas that emanates from decomposition in landfills (termed "landfill gas"). Most of the remaining 50–55% is methane.

=== Industrial and geological ===
Carbon dioxide is a byproduct of the industrial production of hydrogen by steam reforming and the water gas shift reaction in ammonia production. These processes begin with the reaction of water and natural gas (mainly methane).

It is produced by thermal decomposition of limestone, CaCO_{3} by heating (calcining) at about 850 °C (1,560 °F), in the manufacture of quicklime (calcium oxide, CaO), a compound that has many industrial uses:

CaCO_{3} → CaO + CO_{2}

Acids liberate CO_{2} from most metal carbonates. Consequently, it may be obtained directly from natural carbon dioxide springs, where it is produced by the action of acidified water on limestone or dolomite. The reaction between hydrochloric acid and calcium carbonate (limestone or chalk) is shown below:

CaCO_{3} + 2 HCl → CaCl_{2} + H_{2}CO_{3}

The carbonic acid (H_{2}CO_{3}) then decomposes to water and CO_{2}:

H_{2}CO_{3} → CO_{2} + H_{2}O

Such reactions are accompanied by foaming or bubbling, or both, as the gas is released. They have widespread uses in industry because they can be used to neutralize waste acid streams.

== Commercial uses ==
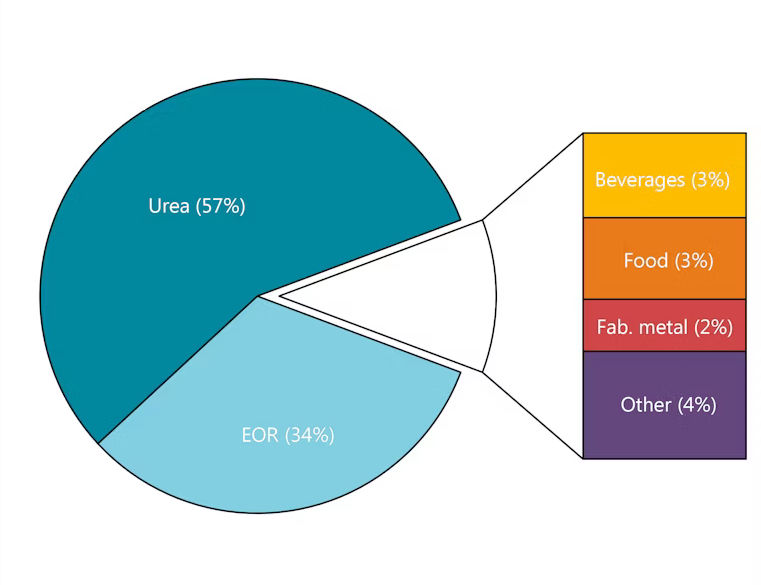
The biggest commercial uses of CO2 are in producing urea for fertilizer and in extracting oil from the ground. Beverages, food, metal fabrication, and other uses account for 3%, 3%, 2%, and 4% of commercial CO2 use, respectively.

Around 230 Mt of CO_{2} are used each year, mostly in the fertiliser industry for urea production (130 million tonnes) and in the oil and gas industry for enhanced oil recovery (70 to 80 million tonnes). Other commercial applications include food and beverage production, metal fabrication, cooling, fire suppression and stimulating plant growth in greenhouses.

Technology exists to capture CO_{2} from industrial flue gas or from the air. Research is ongoing on ways to use captured CO_{2} in products and some of these processes have been deployed commercially. However, the potential to use products is very small compared to the total volume of CO_{2} that could foreseeably be captured. The vast majority of captured CO_{2} is considered a waste product and sequestered in underground geologic formations.

=== Precursor to chemicals ===
In the chemical industry, carbon dioxide is consumed mainly as an ingredient in the production of urea, with a smaller fraction being used to produce methanol and a range of other products. Some carboxylic acid derivatives such as sodium salicylate are prepared using CO_{2} by the Kolbe–Schmitt reaction.

Captured CO_{2} could potentially be used to produce methanol or electrofuels. To be carbon-neutral, the CO_{2} would need to come from bioenergy production or direct air capture.

=== Fossil fuel recovery ===
Carbon dioxide is used in enhanced oil recovery where it is injected into or adjacent to producing oil wells, usually under supercritical conditions, when it becomes miscible with the oil. This approach can increase original oil recovery by reducing residual oil saturation by 7–23% additional to primary extraction. It acts as both a pressurizing agent and, when dissolved into the underground crude oil, significantly reduces its viscosity, and changing surface chemistry enabling the oil to flow more rapidly through the reservoir to the removal well.

Most CO_{2} injected in CO_{2}-EOR projects comes from naturally occurring underground CO_{2} deposits. Some CO_{2} used in EOR is captured from industrial facilities such as natural gas processing plants, using carbon capture technology and transported to the oilfield in pipelines.

=== Agriculture ===
Plants require carbon dioxide to conduct photosynthesis. The atmospheres of greenhouses may (if of large size, must) be enriched with additional CO_{2} to sustain and increase the rate of plant growth. At very high concentrations (100 times atmospheric concentration, or greater), carbon dioxide can be toxic to animal life, so raising the concentration to 10,000 ppm (1%) or higher for several hours will eliminate pests such as whiteflies and spider mites in a greenhouse. Some plants respond more favorably to rising carbon dioxide concentrations than others, which can lead to vegetation regime shifts like woody plant encroachment.

=== Foods ===
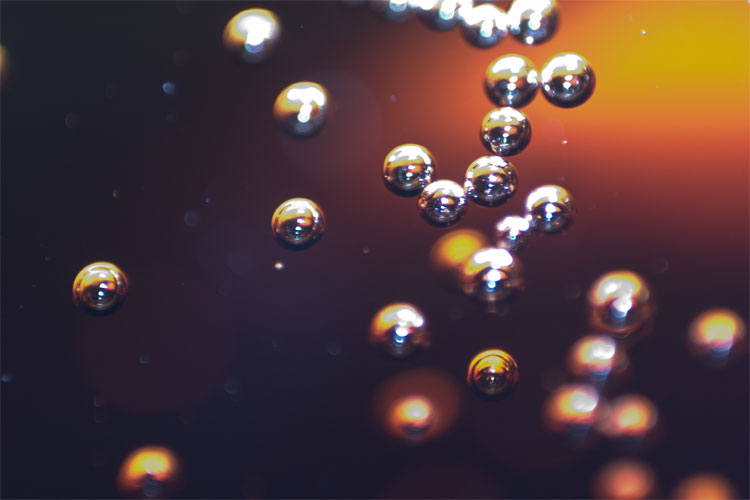
Carbon dioxide bubbles in a soft drink

Carbon dioxide is a food additive used as a propellant and acidity regulator in the food industry. It is approved for usage in the EU (listed as E number E290), US, Australia and New Zealand (listed by its INS number 290).

A candy called Pop Rocks is pressurized with carbon dioxide gas at about 4,000 kPa (40 bar; 580 psi). When placed in the mouth, it dissolves (just like other hard candy) and releases the gas bubbles with an audible pop.

Leavening agents cause dough to rise by producing carbon dioxide. Baker's yeast produces carbon dioxide by fermentation of sugars within the dough, while chemical leaveners such as baking powder and baking soda release carbon dioxide when heated or if exposed to acids.

==== Beverages ====
Carbon dioxide is used to produce carbonated soft drinks and soda water. Traditionally, the carbonation of beer and sparkling wine came about through natural fermentation, but many manufacturers carbonate these drinks with carbon dioxide recovered from the fermentation process. In the case of bottled and kegged beer, the most common method used is carbonation with recycled carbon dioxide. With the exception of British real ale, draught beer is usually transferred from kegs in a cold room or cellar to dispensing taps on the bar using pressurized carbon dioxide, sometimes mixed with nitrogen.

The taste of soda water (and related taste sensations in other carbonated beverages) is an effect of the dissolved carbon dioxide rather than the bursting bubbles of the gas. Carbonic anhydrase 4 converts carbon dioxide to carbonic acid leading to a sour taste, and also the dissolved carbon dioxide induces a somatosensory response.

==== Winemaking ====
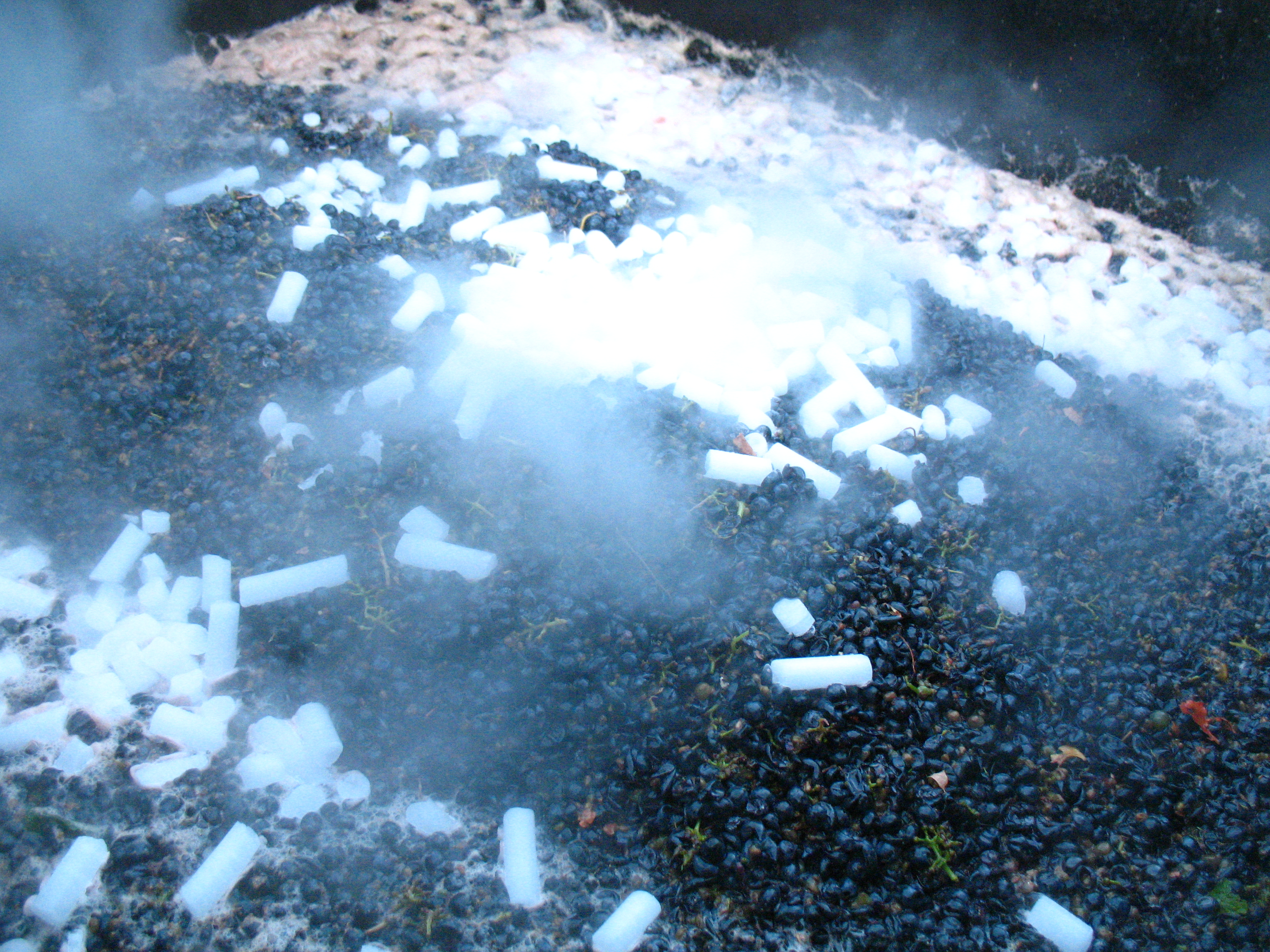
Dry ice used to preserve grapes after harvest

Carbon dioxide in the form of dry ice is often used during the cold soak phase in winemaking to cool clusters of grapes quickly after picking to help prevent spontaneous fermentation by wild yeast. The main advantage of using dry ice over water ice is that it cools the grapes without adding any additional water that might decrease the sugar concentration in the grape must, and thus the alcohol concentration in the finished wine. Carbon dioxide is also used to create a hypoxic environment for carbonic maceration, the process used to produce Beaujolais wine.

Carbon dioxide is sometimes used to top up wine bottles or other storage vessels such as barrels to prevent oxidation, though it has the problem that it can dissolve into the wine, making a previously still wine slightly fizzy. For this reason, other gases such as nitrogen or argon are preferred for this process by professional wine makers.

==== Stunning animals ====
Carbon dioxide is often used to "stun" animals before slaughter. "Stunning" may be a misnomer, as the animals are not knocked out immediately and may suffer distress.

=== Inert gas ===
Carbon dioxide is one of the most commonly used compressed gases for pneumatic (pressurized gas) systems in portable pressure tools. Carbon dioxide is also used as an atmosphere for welding, although in the welding arc, it reacts to oxidize most metals. Use in the automotive industry is common despite significant evidence that welds made in carbon dioxide are more brittle than those made in more inert atmospheres. When used for MIG welding, CO_{2} use is sometimes referred to as MAG welding, for Metal Active Gas, as CO_{2} can react at these high temperatures. It tends to produce a hotter puddle than truly inert atmospheres, improving the flow characteristics. Although, this may be due to atmospheric reactions occurring at the puddle site. This is usually the opposite of the desired effect when welding, as it tends to embrittle the site, but may not be a problem for general mild steel welding, where ultimate ductility is not a major concern.

Carbon dioxide is used in many consumer products that require pressurized gas because it is inexpensive and nonflammable, and because it undergoes a phase transition from gas to liquid at room temperature at an attainable pressure of approximately 60 bar (870 psi; 59 atm), allowing far more carbon dioxide to fit in a given container than otherwise would. Life jackets often contain canisters of pressured carbon dioxide for quick inflation. Aluminium capsules of CO_{2} are also sold as supplies of compressed gas for air guns, paintball markers/guns, inflating bicycle tires, and for making carbonated water. High concentrations of carbon dioxide can also be used to kill pests. Liquid carbon dioxide is used in supercritical drying of some food products and technological materials, in the preparation of specimens for scanning electron microscopy and in the decaffeination of coffee beans.

=== Fire extinguisher ===
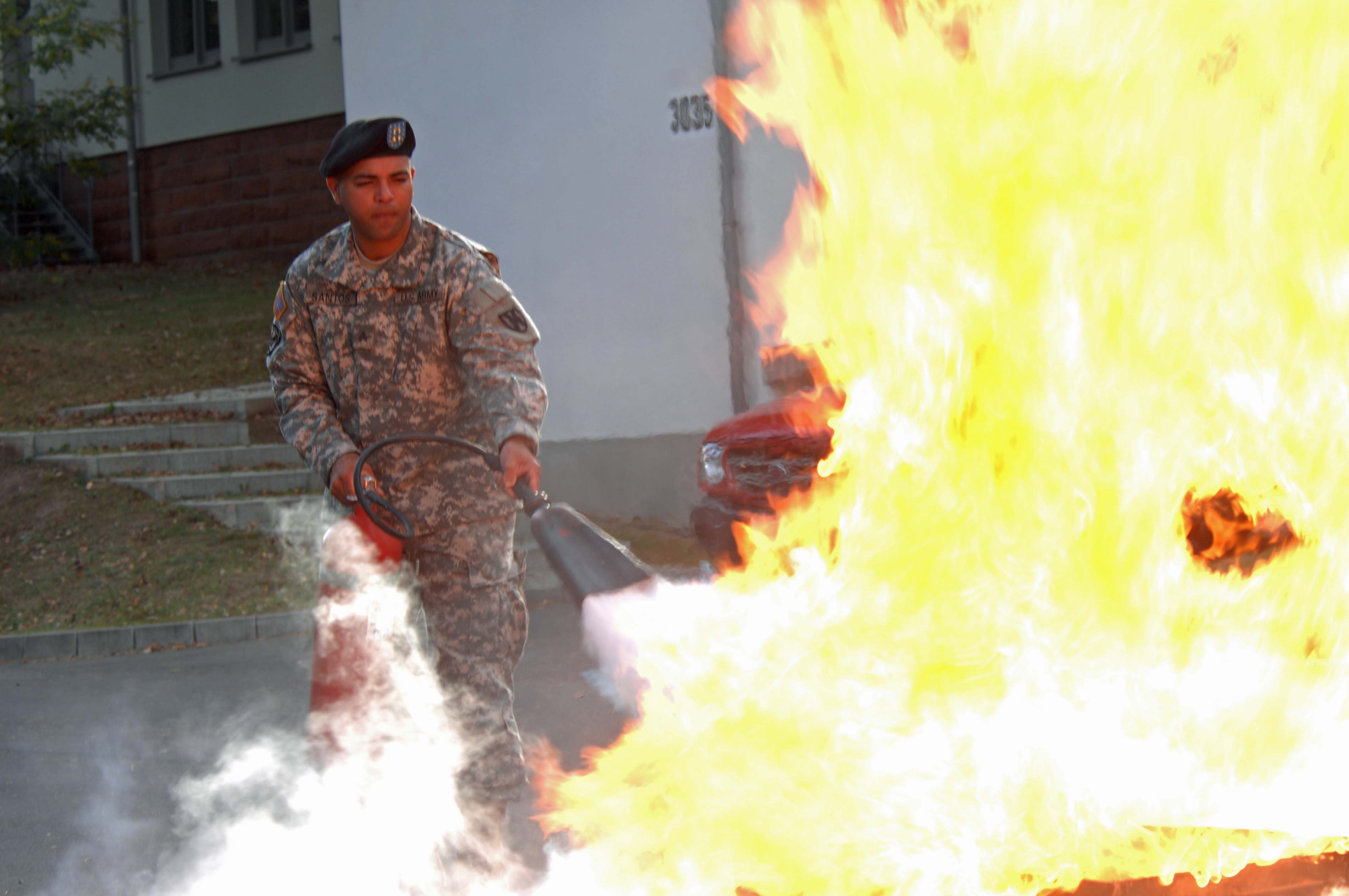
Use of a CO_{2} fire extinguisher

Carbon dioxide can be used to extinguish flames by flooding the environment around the flame with the gas. It does not itself react to extinguish the flame, but starves the flame of oxygen by displacing it. Some fire extinguishers, especially those designed for electrical fires, contain liquid carbon dioxide under pressure. Carbon dioxide extinguishers work well on small flammable liquid and electrical fires, but not on ordinary combustible fires, because they do not cool the burning substances significantly, and when the carbon dioxide disperses, they can catch fire upon exposure to atmospheric oxygen. They are mainly used in server rooms.

Carbon dioxide has also been widely used as an extinguishing agent in fixed fire-protection systems for local application of specific hazards and total flooding of a protected space. International Maritime Organization standards recognize carbon dioxide systems for fire protection of ship holds and engine rooms. Carbon dioxide-based fire-protection systems have been linked to several deaths, because it can cause suffocation in sufficiently high concentrations. A review of CO_{2} systems identified 51 incidents between 1975 and the date of the report (2000), causing 72 deaths and 145 injuries.

=== Supercritical CO_{2} as solvent ===
Liquid carbon dioxide is a good solvent for many lipophilic organic compounds and is used to decaffeinate coffee. Carbon dioxide has attracted attention in the pharmaceutical and other chemical processing industries as a less toxic alternative to more traditional solvents such as organochlorides. It is also used by some dry cleaners for this reason. It is used in the preparation of some aerogels because of the properties of supercritical carbon dioxide.

=== Refrigerant ===
Comparison of the pressure–temperature phase diagrams of carbon dioxide (red) and water (blue) as a log-lin chart with phase transitions points at 1 atmosphere

Liquid and solid carbon dioxide are important refrigerants, especially in the food industry, where they are employed during the transportation and storage of ice cream and other frozen foods. Solid carbon dioxide is called "dry ice" and is used for small shipments where refrigeration equipment is not practical. Solid carbon dioxide is always below −78.5 °C (−109.3 °F) at regular atmospheric pressure, regardless of the air temperature.

Liquid carbon dioxide (industry nomenclature R744 or R-744) was used as a refrigerant prior to the use of dichlorodifluoromethane (R12, a chlorofluorocarbon (CFC) compound). CO_{2} might enjoy a renaissance because one of the main substitutes to CFCs, 1,1,1,2-tetrafluoroethane (R134a, a hydrofluorocarbon (HFC) compound) contributes to climate change more than CO_{2} does. CO_{2} physical properties are highly favorable for cooling, refrigeration, and heating purposes, having a high volumetric cooling capacity. Due to the need to operate at pressures of up to 130 bars (1,900 psi; 13,000 kPa), CO_{2} systems require highly mechanically resistant reservoirs and components that have already been developed for mass production in many sectors. In automobile air conditioning, in more than 90% of all driving conditions for latitudes higher than 50°, CO_{2} (R744) operates more efficiently than systems using HFCs (e.g., R134a). Its environmental advantages (GWP of 1, non-ozone depleting, non-toxic, non-flammable) could make it the future working fluid to replace current HFCs in cars, supermarkets, and heat pump water heaters, among others. Coca-Cola has fielded CO_{2}-based beverage coolers and the U.S. Army is interested in CO_{2} refrigeration and heating technology.

=== Minor uses ===
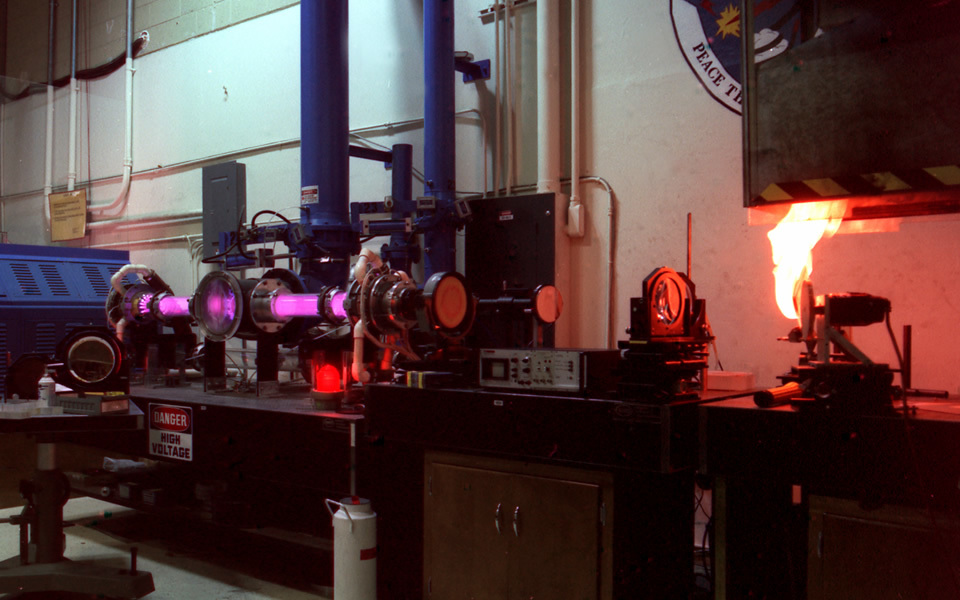
A carbon-dioxide laser

Carbon dioxide is the lasing medium in a carbon-dioxide laser, which is one of the earliest type of lasers.

Carbon dioxide can be used as a means of controlling the pH of swimming pools, by continuously adding gas to the water, thus keeping the pH from rising. Among the advantages of this is the avoidance of handling (more hazardous) acids. Similarly, it is also used in the maintaining reef aquaria, where it is commonly used in calcium reactors to temporarily lower the pH of water being passed over calcium carbonate in order to allow the calcium carbonate to dissolve into the water more freely, where it is used by some corals to build their skeleton.

Used as the primary coolant in the British advanced gas-cooled reactor for nuclear power generation.

Carbon dioxide induction is commonly used for the euthanasia of laboratory research animals. Methods to administer CO_{2} include placing animals directly into a closed, prefilled chamber containing CO_{2}, or exposure to a gradually increasing concentration of CO_{2}. The American Veterinary Medical Association's 2020 guidelines for carbon dioxide induction claim that a displacement rate of 30–70% of the chamber or cage volume per minute is optimal for the euthanasia of small rodents. Percentages of CO_{2} vary for different species, based on identified optimal percentages claimed to minimize distress.

Carbon dioxide is also used in several related cleaning and surface-preparation techniques.

== History of discovery ==
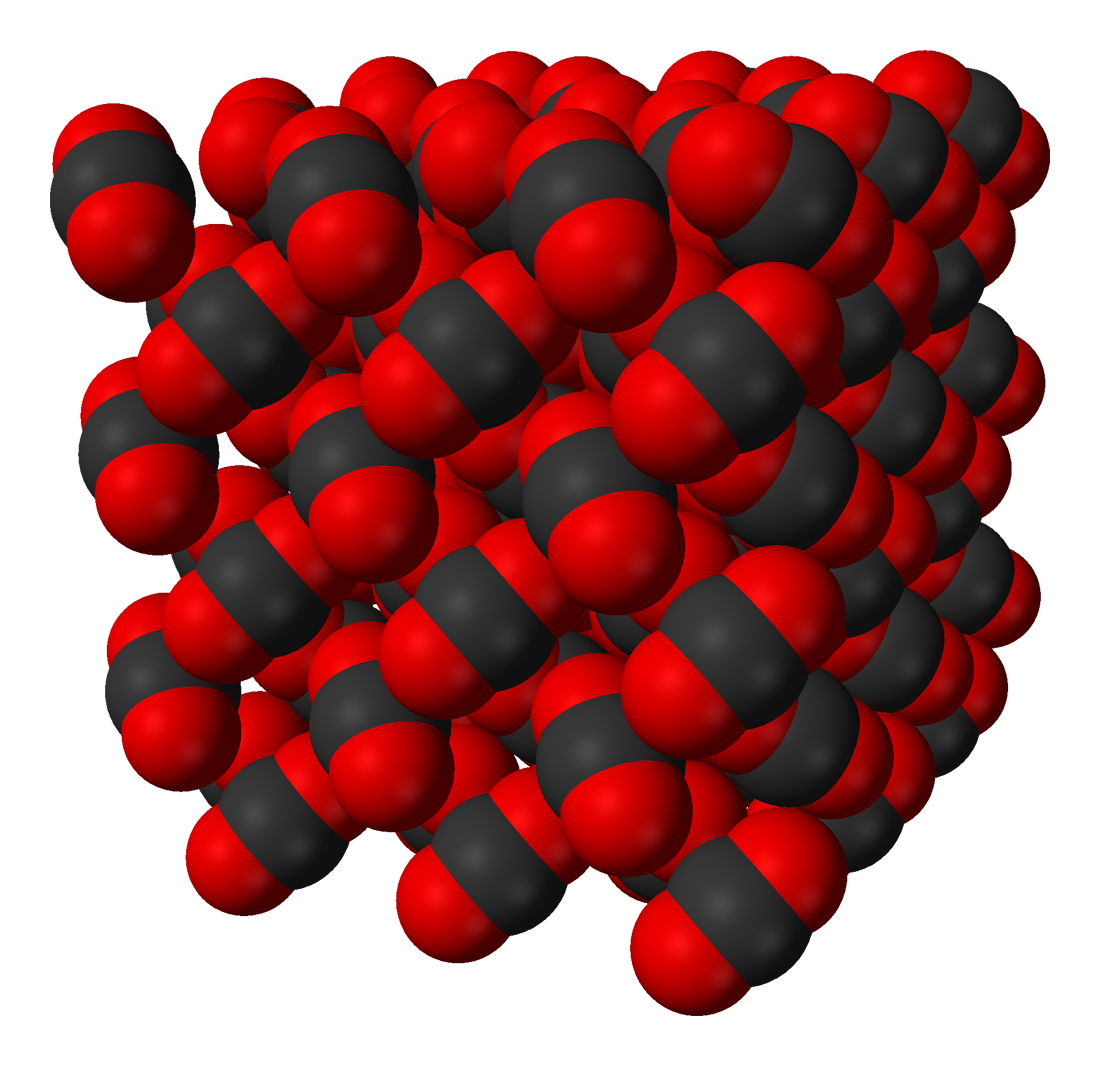
Crystal structure of dry ice

Carbon dioxide was the first gas to be described as a discrete substance. In about 1640, the Flemish chemist Jan Baptist van Helmont observed that when he burned charcoal in a closed vessel, the mass of the resulting ash was much less than that of the original charcoal. His interpretation was that the rest of the charcoal had been transmuted into an invisible substance he termed a "gas" (from Greek "chaos") or "wild spirit" (spiritus sylvestris).

The properties of carbon dioxide were further studied in the 1750s by the Scottish physician Joseph Black. He found that limestone (calcium carbonate) could be heated or treated with acids to yield a gas he called "fixed air". He observed that the fixed air was denser than air and supported neither flame nor animal life. Black also found that when bubbled through limewater (a saturated aqueous solution of calcium hydroxide), it would precipitate calcium carbonate. He used this phenomenon to illustrate that carbon dioxide is produced by animal respiration and microbial fermentation. In 1772, English chemist Joseph Priestley published a paper entitled Impregnating Water with Fixed Air in which he described a process of dripping sulfuric acid (or oil of vitriol as Priestley knew it) on chalk in order to produce carbon dioxide, and forcing the gas to dissolve by agitating a bowl of water in contact with the gas.

Carbon dioxide was first liquefied (at elevated pressures) in 1823 by Humphry Davy and Michael Faraday. The earliest description of solid carbon dioxide (dry ice) was given by the French inventor Adrien-Jean-Pierre Thilorier, who in 1835 opened a pressurized container of liquid carbon dioxide, only to find that the cooling produced by the rapid evaporation of the liquid yielded a "snow" of solid CO_{2}.

Carbon dioxide in combination with nitrogen was known from earlier times as Blackdamp, stythe or choke damp. (Note: Sometimes spelt "choak-damp" in 19th Century texts.) Along with the other types of damp it was encountered in mining operations and well sinking. Slow oxidation of coal and biological processes replaced the oxygen to create a suffocating mixture of nitrogen and carbon dioxide.

== See also ==
- Arterial blood gas test – Blood test that measures amounts of dissolved gas
- Bosch reaction – Process that is used to industrially create hydrogen
- Carbon dioxide removal – Removal of atmospheric carbon dioxide through human activity (from the atmosphere)
- Gilbert Plass – Canadian physicist (1920–2004) (early work on CO_{2} and climate change)
- Greenhouse Gases Observing Satellite – Japanese Earth observation satellite
- List of countries by carbon dioxide emissions
- List of least carbon efficient power stations
- Meromictic lake – Permanently stratified lake with layers of water that do not intermix
- NASA's Orbiting Carbon Observatory 2 – NASA climate satellite
- Soil gas – Gases in the air space between soil components
