= CA4 =

CA4, CA-4, or Ca4 may refer to:

- Carbonic anhydrase 4, an enzyme that in humans is encoded by the CA4 gene
- Cornu Ammonis region 4, a region of the hippocampus
- United States Court of Appeals for the Fourth Circuit
- CAC CA-4, a 1941 Australian bomber aircraft
- USS Pittsburgh (CA-4), a 1901 United States Navy armored cruiser
- California's 4th congressional district
- California State Route 4
- Central America-4 Border Control Agreement, a boundary treaty between Guatemala, El Salvador, Honduras, and Nicaragua
- Combretastatin A-4, a natural polyphenol
- Ca4 line, a regional Catalonia railway line connecting Barcelona and Lleida-Pirineus
- 4 atoms of Calcium
- Caproni Ca.4, an Italian heavy bomber of the World War I era
