= Carbon dioxide (data page) =

Chemical data page

This page provides supplementary chemical data on carbon dioxide, including aspects of its solid, liquid, gaseous and supercritical phases.

== Material Safety Data Sheet ==
The handling of this chemical may incur notable safety precautions. It is highly recommended that you seek the Material Safety Datasheet (MSDS) for this chemical from a reliable source such as SIRI, and follow its directions. MSDS for solid carbon dioxide is available from Pacific Dry Ice, inc.

== Structure and properties ==
Structure and properties
Index of refraction, n_{D}	1.000449 at 589.3 nm and 0 °C
Dielectric constant, ε_{r}	1.60 ε_{0} at 0 °C, 50 atm
Average energy per C=O bond	804.4 kJ/mol at 298 K (25 °C)
Bond length	C=O 116.21 pm (1.1621 Å)
Bond angle	O–C–O: 180° (STP), decreasing to as low as 163° at higher temperature and/or pressure
Magnetic susceptibility	−0.49×10^−6 cm^3/mol
Surface tension	4.34 dyn/cm at 20 °C and equilibrium pressure
Viscosity of liquid at equilibrium pressure	0.0925 mPa·s at 5 °C; 0.0852 mPa·s at 10 °C; 0.0712 mPa·s at 20 °C; 0.0625 mPa·s at 25 °C; 0.0321 mPa·s at 31.1 °C

== Thermodynamic properties ==
Phase behavior
Triple point	216.58 K (−56.57 °C), 518.5 kPa
Critical point	304.18 K (31.03 °C), 7.38 MPa
Std enthalpy change of fusion, Δ_{fus}H^{~~o~~}	9.019 kJ/mol at triple point
Entropy change of fusion, Δ_{fus}S	40 J/(mol·K) at triple point
Std enthalpy change of vaporization, Δ_{vap}H^{~~o~~}	15.326 kJ/mol at 215.7 K (−57.5 °C) (348 J/g)
Std entropy change of vaporization, Δ_{vap}S^{~~o~~}	70.8 J/(mol·K)
Solid properties
Std enthalpy change of formation, Δ_{f}H^{~~o~~}_{solid}	−427.4 kJ/mol
Standard molar entropy, S^{~~o~~}_{solid}	51.07 J/(mol·K)
Heat capacity, c_{p}	2.534 J/(mol·K) at 15.52 K (−257.63 °C); 47.11 J/(mol·K) at 146.48 K (−126.67 °C); 54.55 J/(mol·K) at 189.78 K (−83.37 °C)
Liquid properties
Std enthalpy change of formation, Δ_{f}H^{~~o~~}_{liquid}	−393.5kJ/mol
Standard molar entropy, S^{~~o~~}_{liquid}	213.7J/(mol K)
Heat capacity, c_{p}	80—150 J/(mol·K) at 220—290 K
Gas properties
Std enthalpy change of formation, Δ_{f}H^{~~o~~}_{gas}	−393.52 kJ/mol
Standard molar entropy, S^{~~o~~}_{gas}	213.79 J/(mol·K)
Heat capacity, c_{p}	33.89 J/(mol K) at –75 °C; 36.33 J/(mol K) at 0 °C; 36.61 J/(mol K) at 15 °C; 38.01 J/(mol K) at 100 °C; 43.81 J/(mol K) at 400 °C; 50.87 J/(mol K) at 1000 °C; 56.91 J/(mol K) at 2000 °C; 53.01 J/(mol K) at 38 °C, 2457 kPa; 60.01 J/(mol K) at 38 °C, 5482 kPa; 183.1 J/(mol K) at 38 °C, 8653 kPa
Heat capacity ratio γ = c_{p}/c_{v}	1.37 at –75 °C; 1.310 at 0 °C; 1.304 at 15 °C; 1.281 at 100 °C; 1.235 at 400 °C; 1.195 at 1000 °C; 1.171 at 2000 °C
van der Waals' constants	a = 363.96 L^{2} kPa/mol^{2} b = 0.04267 liter per mole
Equilibrium with carbon monoxide CO + 1/2O_{2} → CO_{2} K = $\frac{[\ce{CO2}]}{[\ce{CO}][\ce{O2}]^{1/2}}$ pK = log_{10} K	pK = 45.0438 at T = 298.16 K pK = 25.0054 at T = 500 K pK = 16.5383 at T = 700 K pK = 11.8409 at T = 900 K pK = 8.8583 at T = 1100 K pK = 6.7989 at T = 1300 K pK = 5.2943 at T = 1500 K

== Solubility in water at various temperatures ==
Aqueous Solubility of CO_{2} at 101.3 kPa (1 atm) partial pressure

Temperature	^{‡}Dissolved; CO_{2} volume per volume H_{2}O	grams CO_{2} per 100 ml H_{2}O
0 °C	1.713	0.3346
1 °C	1.646	0.3213
2 °C	1.584	0.3091
3 °C	1.527	0.2978
4 °C	1.473	0.2871
5 °C	1.424	0.2774
6 °C	1.377	0.2681
7 °C	1.331	0.2589
8 °C	1.282	0.2492
9 °C	1.237	0.2403
10 °C	1.194	0.2318
11 °C	1.154	0.2239
12 °C	1.117	0.2165
13 °C	1.083	0.2098
14 °C	1.050	0.2032
15 °C	0.98819	0.1970
16 °C	0.985	0.1903
17 °C	0.956	0.1845

Temperature	^{‡}Dissolved; CO_{2} volume per volume H_{2}O	grams CO_{2} per 100 ml H_{2}O
18 °C	0.928	0.1789
19 °C	0.902	0.1737
20 °C	0.878	0.1688
21 °C	0.854	0.1640
22 °C	0.829	0.1590
23 °C	0.804	0.1540
24 °C	0.781	0.1493
25 °C	0.759	0.1449
26 °C	0.738	0.1406
27 °C	0.718	0.1366
28 °C	0.699	0.1327
29 °C	0.682	0.1292
30 °C	0.655	0.1257
35 °C	0.592	0.1105
40 °C	0.530	0.0973
45 °C	0.479	0.0860
50 °C	0.436	0.0761
60 °C	0.359	0.0576

- ^{‡}Second column of table indicates solubility at each given temperature in volume of CO_{2} as it would be measured at 101.3 kPa and 0 °C per volume of water.
- The solubility is given for "pure water", i.e., water which contain only CO_{2}. This water is going to be acidic. For example, at 25 °C the pH of 3.9 is expected (see carbonic acid). At less acidic pH values, the solubility will increase because of the pH-dependent speciation of CO_{2}.

== Vapor pressure of solid and liquid ==
T in °C	−134.3_{(s)}	−119.5_{(s)}	−108.6_{(s)}	−100.2_{(s)}	−85.7_{(s)}	−78.2_{(s)}	−69.1_{(s)}	−56.7	−39.5	−18.9	5.9	22.4
P in mm Hg	1	10	40	100	400	760	1520	3800	7600	15200	30400	45600
P in atm (2sf, derived from mm Hg)	0.0013	0.013	0.053	0.13	0.53	1.0	2.0	5.0	10	20	40	60
P in kPa (derived from mm Hg / atm)	0.13	1.3	5.3	13	53	101.325	202.65	506.625	1013.25	2026.5	4053	6079.5

Table data obtained from CRC Handbook of Chemistry and Physics 44th ed. Annotation "(s)" indicates equilibrium temperature of vapor over solid. Otherwise temperature is equilibrium of vapor over liquid. For kPa values, where datum is whole numbers of atmospheres exact kPa values are given, elsewhere 2 significant figures derived from mm Hg data.

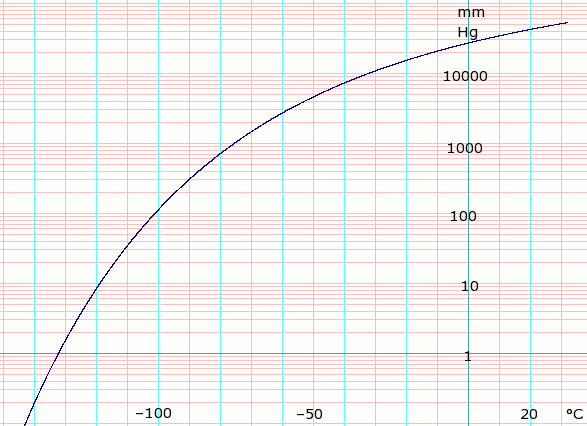
log of Carbon Dioxide vapor pressure. Uses formula $\scriptstyle \ln P_\text{mmHg} = \ln \frac{760}{101.325} - 24.03761 \ln(T + 273.15) - \frac{7062.404}{T + 273.15} + 166.3861 + 3.368548 \times 10^{-5} (T + 273.15)^2$ obtained from CHERIC

== Liquid/vapor equilibrium thermodynamic data ==
The table below gives thermodynamic data of liquid CO_{2} in equilibrium with its vapor at various temperatures. Heat content data, heat of vaporization, and entropy values are relative to the liquid state at 0 °C temperature and 3483 kPa pressure. To convert heat values to joules per mole values, multiply by 44.095 g/mol. To convert densities to moles per liter, multiply by 22.678 cm^{3} mol/(L·g). Data obtained from CRC Handbook of Chemistry and Physics, 44th ed. pages 2560–2561, except for critical temperature line (31.1 °C) and temperatures −30 °C and below, which are taken from Lange's Handbook of Chemistry, 10th ed. page 1463.

Carbon dioxide liquid/vapor equilibrium thermodynamic data
Temp. °C	P_{vap} Vapor pressure kPa	H_{liq} Heat content liquid J/g	H_{vap} Heat content vapor J/g	Δ_{vap}H^{~~o~~} Heat of vapor- ization J/g	ρ_{vap} Density of vapor g/cm^{3}	ρ_{liq} Density of liquid g/cm^{3}	S_{liq} Entropy liquid J/mol-°C	S_{vap} Entropy vapor J/mol-°C
−56.6	518.3					1.179
−56.0	531.8					1.177
−54.0	579.1					1.169
−52.0	629.6					1.162
−50.0	683.4					1.155
−48.0	740.6					1.147
−46.0	801.3					1.139
−44.0	865.6					1.131
−42.0	933.8					1.124
−40.0	1005.7					1.116
−38.0	1081.9					1.108
−36.0	1161.8					1.100
−34.0	1246.2					1.092
−32.0	1335.1					1.084
−30.0	1428.6					1.075
−28.89	1521	−55.69	237.1	292.9	0.03846	1.0306	−9.48	43.41
−27.78	1575	−53.76	237.3	291.0	0.03987	1.0276	−9.13	43.21
−26.67	1630	−51.84	237.6	289.4	0.04133	1.0242	−8.78	43.01
−25.56	1686	−49.87	237.6	287.5	0.04283	1.0209	−8.45	42.78
−24.44	1744	−47.91	237.8	285.7	0.04440	1.0170	−8.10	42.56
−23.33	1804	−45.94	237.8	283.6	0.04600	1.0132	−7.75	42.36
−22.22	1866	−43.93	237.8	281.7	0.04767	1.0093	−7.40	42.14
−21.11	1928	−41.92	237.8	279.6	0.04938	1.0053	−7.05	41.94
−20.00	1993	−39.91	237.8	277.8	0.05116	1.0011	−6.68	41.71
−18.89	2059	−37.86	237.8	275.7	0.05300	0.9968	−6.31	41.49
−17.78	2114	−35.82	237.6	273.6	0.05489	0.9923	−5.98	41.27
−16.67	2197	−33.73	237.6	271.2	0.05686	0.9875	−5.61	41.05
−15.56	2269	−31.64	237.3	269.2	0.05888	0.9829	−5.26	40.83
−14.44	2343	−29.54	237.3	266.9	0.06098	0.9782	−4.91	40.61
−13.33	2418	−27.41	237.1	264.5	0.06314	0.9734	−4.54	40.39
−12.22	2495	−25.27	236.9	262.2	0.06539	0.9665	−4.17	40.15
−11.11	2574	−23.09	236.7	259.7	0.06771	0.9639	−3.80	39.92
−10.00	2654	−20.90	236.4	257.3	0.07011	0.9592	−3.43	39.68
−8.89	2738	−18.69	235.9	254.8	0.07259	0.9543	−3.06	39.46
−7.78	2823	−16.45	235.7	252.2	0.07516	0.9494	−2.69	39.22
−6.67	2910	−14.18	235.2	249.4	0.07783	0.9443	−2.32	38.98
−5.56	2999	−11.90	234.8	246.6	0.08059	0.9393	−1.94	38.74
−4.44	3090	−9.977	234.3	243.8	0.08347	0.9340	−1.57	38.50
−3.89	3136	−8.410	234.1	242.4	0.08494	0.9313	−1.37	38.37
−2.78	3230	−6.046	233.6	239.7	0.08797	0.9260	−0.98	38.12
−1.67	3327	−3.648	232.9	236.6	0.09111	0.9206	−0.59	37.88
−0.56	3425	−1.222	232.4	233.6	0.09438	0.9150	−0.20	37.62
0.56	3526	1.234	231.7	230.5	0.09776	0.9094	0.20	37.36
1.67	3629	3.728	231.0	227.3	0.1013	0.9036	0.61	37.08
2.78	3735	6.268	230.4	224.0	0.1050	0.8975	1.01	36.83
3.89	3843	8.445	229.4	220.5	0.1088	0.8914	1.42	36.55
5.00	3953	11.46	228.5	217.0	0.1128	0.8850	1.83	36.25
6.11	4067	14.13	227.6	213.4	0.1169	0.8784	2.25	35.98
7.22	4182	16.85	226.5	209.7	0.1213	0.8716	2.69	35.68
8.33	4300	19.63	225.4	205.8	0.1258	0.8645	3.12	35.39
9.44	4420	22.46	224.3	201.8	0.1306	0.8571	3.56	35.07
10.56	4544	25.36	223.1	197.7	0.1355	0.8496	4.02	34.76
11.67	4670	28.33	221.8	193.4	0.1408	0.8418	4.48	34.45
12.78	4798	31.35	220.3	188.9	0.1463	0.8338	4.94	34.11
13.89	4929	34.49	218.8	184.3	0.1521	0.8254	5.42	33.76
15.00	5063	37.30	217.2	179.5	0.1583	0.8168	5.92	33.41
16.11	5200	41.03	215.1	174.4	0.1648	0.8076	6.42	33.02
17.22	5340	44.48	213.6	169.1	0.1717	0.7977	6.96	32.66
18.33	5482	48.03	211.5	163.5	0.1791	0.7871	7.49	32.25
19.44	5628	51.71	209.4	157.6	0.1869	0.7759	8.04	31.83
20.56	5776	55.61	207.0	151.4	0.1956	0.7639	8.63	31.38
21.67	5928	59.66	204.3	144.7	0.2054	0.7508	9.24	30.90
22.78	6083	63.97	201.5	137.5	0.2151	0.7367	9.89	30.39
23.89	6240	68.58	198.4	129.8	0.2263	0.7216	10.57	29.85
25.00	6401	73.51	194.8	121.3	0.2387	0.7058	11.31	29.24
26.11	6565	78.91	190.7	111.8	0.2532	0.6894	12.10	28.60
27.22	6733	84.94	186.0	101.1	0.2707	0.6720	12.99	27.84
28.33	6902	91.88	180.4	88.49	0.2923	0.6507	14.00	26.95
29.44	7081	100.4	173.1	72.72	0.3204	0.6209	15.24	25.85
30.00	7164	105.6	168.4	62.76	0.3378	0.5992	16.01	25.15
30.56	7253	112.3	162.3	50.04	0.3581	0.5661	16.99	24.24
31.1	7391			0.00	0.4641	0.4641
Temp. °C	P_{vap} Vapor pressure kPa	H_{liq} Heat content liquid J/g	H_{vap} Heat content vapor J/g	Δ_{vap}H^{~~o~~} Heat of vapor- ization J/g	ρ_{vap} Density of vapor g/cm^{3}	ρ_{liq} Density of liquid g/cm^{3}	S_{liq} Entropy liquid J/mol-°C	S_{vap} Entropy vapor J/mol-°C

== Spectral data ==
UV-Vis
λ_{max}	? nm
Extinction coefficient, ε	?
IR (Note: Because nitrogen and oxygen are symmetrical and carbon dioxide and water vapor are not, the air in an infrared spectrophotometer may show absorbances for CO_{2} and water. This is easily overcome by subtracting a blank spectrum from the experimental spectrum, and instruments are often purged with dry nitrogen as well.)
Major absorption bands	2347 and 667 cm^{−1} (4.26 and 14.99 um)
NMR
Proton NMR	not applicable
Carbon-13 NMR	125.0
MS
Masses of main fragments
