= Amorphous carbonia =

Amorphous carbonia, also called a-carbonia or a-CO_{2}, is an exotic amorphous solid form of carbon dioxide that is analogous to amorphous silica glass. It was first made in the laboratory in 2006 by subjecting dry ice to high pressures (40-48 gigapascal, or 400,000 to 480,000 atmospheres), in a diamond anvil cell. Amorphous carbonia is not stable at ordinary pressures—it quickly reverts to normal CO_{2}.

While normally carbon dioxide forms molecular crystals, where individual molecules are bound by Van der Waals forces, in amorphous carbonia a covalently bound three-dimensional network of atoms is formed, in a structure analogous to silicon dioxide or germanium dioxide glass.

Mixtures of a-carbonia and a-silica may be a prospective very hard and stiff glass material stable at room temperature. Such glass may serve as protective coatings, e.g. in microelectronics.

The discovery has implications for astrophysics, as interiors of massive planets may contain amorphous solid carbon dioxide.
