= Carbonic anhydrase 4 =

Enzyme found in humans

CA4
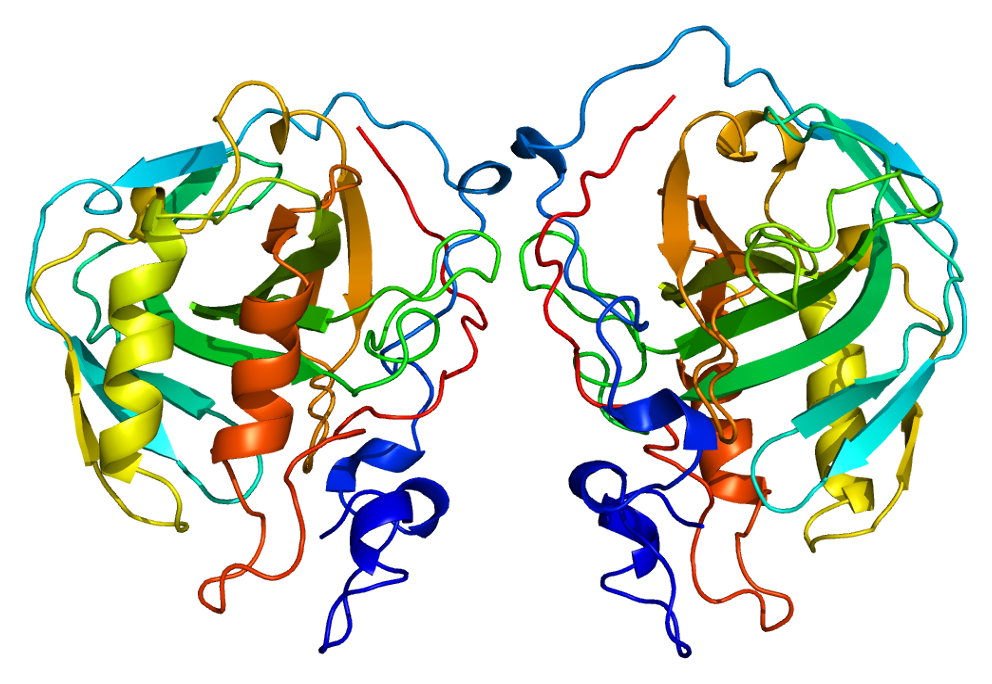

Identifiers
- Aliases: CA4, CAIV, Car4, RP17, carbonic anhydrase 4
- External IDs: OMIM: 114760; MGI: 1096574; GeneCards: CA4
Available structures
PDB	Ortholog search: PDBe RCSB
PDB	List of PDB id codes 1ZNC, 3F7B, 3F7U, 3FW3
Enzyme activity
EC #	BRENDA	ExPASy	KEGG	MetaCyc
4.2.1.1	↗	↗	↗	↗

Gene location (Human)
Chr.	Chromosome 17 (human)
Band	17q23.1	Start	60,149,942 bp
Band	17q23.1	End	60,170,899 bp

Gene location (Mouse)
Chr.	Chromosome 11 (mouse)
Band	11|11 C	Start	84,848,612 bp
Band	11|11 C	End	84,856,870 bp
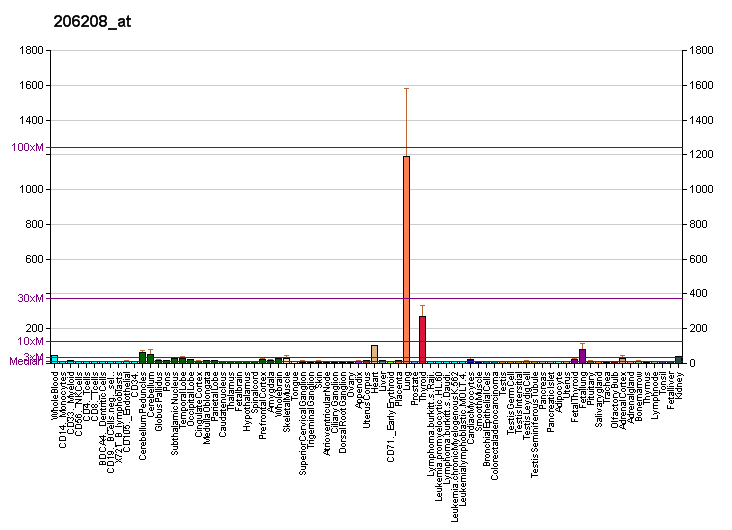

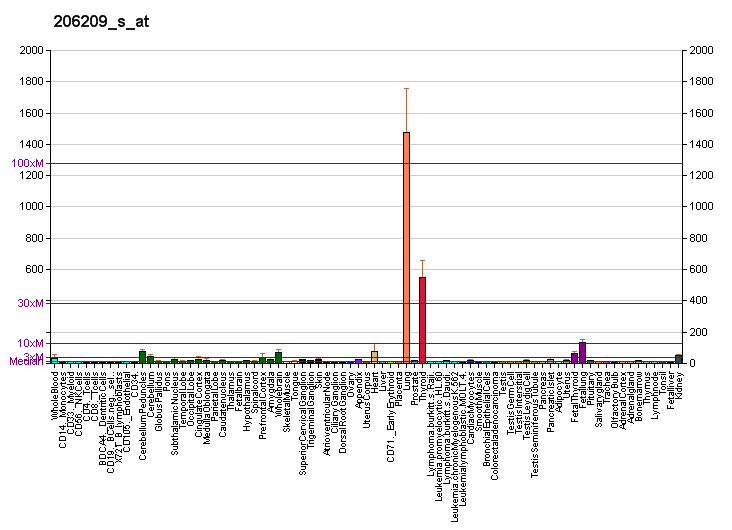
RNA expression pattern
Bgee	Human / Mouse (ortholog); Top expressed in: mucosa of transverse colon; rectum; cerebellar hemisphere; right hemisphere of cerebellum; right lung; paraflocculus of cerebellum; left lobe of thyroid gland; upper lobe of left lung; mucosa of sigmoid colon; cerebellar vermis / Top expressed in: left colon; yolk sac; epiblast; right kidney; right lung lobe; embryo; proximal tubule; lobe of cerebellum; cerebellar vermis; lateral geniculate nucleus; More reference expression data
BioGPS	More reference expression data
Gene ontology
Molecular function	zinc ion binding; metal ion binding; protein binding; lyase activity; carbonate dehydratase activity; carbonic anhydrase
Cellular component	rough endoplasmic reticulum; Golgi apparatus; membrane; secretory granule membrane; anchored component of plasma membrane; plasma membrane; transport vesicle membrane; cell surface; brush border membrane; trans-Golgi network; basolateral plasma membrane; apical plasma membrane; anchored component of external side of plasma membrane; perinuclear region of cytoplasm; anchored component of membrane; extracellular exosome; endoplasmic reticulum-Golgi intermediate compartment
Biological process	one-carbon metabolic process; bicarbonate transport; metabolism
Sources:Amigo / QuickGO
Orthologs
Databases	NCBI: entry; OMA: entry
Species	Human	Mouse
Entrez	762	12351
Ensembl	ENSG00000167434	ENSMUSG00000000805
UniProt	P22748	Q64444
RefSeq (mRNA)	NM_000717	NM_007607
RefSeq (protein)	NP_000708	NP_031633
Location (UCSC)	Chr 17: 60.15 – 60.17 Mb	Chr 11: 84.85 – 84.86 Mb
PubMed search
- Wikidata
View/Edit Human	View/Edit Mouse

Carbonic anhydrase 4 is an enzyme that in humans is encoded by the CA4 gene.

== Function ==
Carbonic anhydrases (CAs) are a large family of zinc metalloenzymes that catalyze the reversible hydration of carbon dioxide. They participate in a variety of biological processes, including respiration, calcification, acid-base balance, bone resorption, and the formation of aqueous humor, cerebrospinal fluid, saliva, and gastric acid. They show extensive diversity in tissue distribution and in their subcellular localization. CA IV is a glycosylphosphatidyl-inositol-anchored membrane isozyme expressed on the luminal surfaces of pulmonary (and certain other) capillaries and of proximal renal tubules. CA-IV is also expressed on the luminal surface of brain capillary endothelial cells. Its exact function is not known, however, it may have a role in inherited renal abnormalities of bicarbonate transport.

CA IV has been identified in pulmonary epithelium of many mammalian species and may be uniquely adaptive for gas exchange necessary for the high metabolic requirements of mammals. A majority of the CO_{2} produced by metabolism is transported as bicarbonate (HCO_{3}^{−}). At the tissue capillary, CO_{2} diffuses from tissue to plasma. Other forms of carbonic anhydrase enzyme are not present in the plasma, restricting the equilibrium reaction of CO_{2} + H_{2}O ⇌ H_{2}CO_{3} ⇌ H^{+} + HCO_{3}^{−}. CO_{2} in the plasma diffuses into the Red Blood Cell. CA is present within the Red Blood Cell, facilitating the conversion of CO_{2} to HCO_{3}^{−}. HCO_{3}^{−} so produced is transferred by the HCO_{3}^{−}/Cl^{−} "shuttle" from the interior of the Red Blood Cell to the plasma. HCO_{3}^{−} does not diffuse across cell membranes and, in the absence of CA, stays as HCO_{3}^{−} and concentrates in plasma. Up to 80% of metabolically produced CO_{2} is transported in plasma in the form of HCO_{3}^{−}. Blood moves from the tissue capillary to the pulmonary capillary where CO_{2} is exchanged at the lung. In the pulmonary capillary, bicarbonate can not simply diffuse either into the Red Blood Cell or the alveoli. It is traditionally thought that HCO_{3}^{−} is returned to the interior of the Red Blood Cell by a reversal of the HCO_{3}^{−}/Cl^{−} shuttle, where, in the presence of CA, it is returned to a CO_{2} form to diffuse from the interior of the Red Blood Cell, to the plasma and then into the alveoli. Membrane bound CA (CA IV) on the luminal side of the pulmonary membrane would have direct contact with plasma HCO_{3}^{−} and would enzymatically convert HCO_{3}^{−} to CO_{2} in the area immediately proximal to the exchange membrane, greatly increasing the concentration gradient for exchange. In this way, plasma HCO_{3}^{−} can be converted to CO_{2} within the plasma compartment and exchanged with the alveoli without the requirement of returning the HCO_{3}^{−} to the interior of the Red Blood Cell.

== Interactions ==
CA4 has been shown to interact with Band 3.

== Research ==
=== Blood-brain barrier delivery ===
CA-IV was identified as a receptor enabling certain engineered adeno-associated viral (AAV) vectors to cross the blood-brain barrier in mice. CA-IV-targeted brain delivery has then been show to be applicable to nonviral therapeutic modalities: antibodies conjugated to a CA-IV-binding derivative of brinzolamide crossed the blood-brain barrier and reached brain parenchyma following intravenous administration in mice and neonatal macaques.
